= Pilning railway station =

Railway station near Bristol, England

Pilning
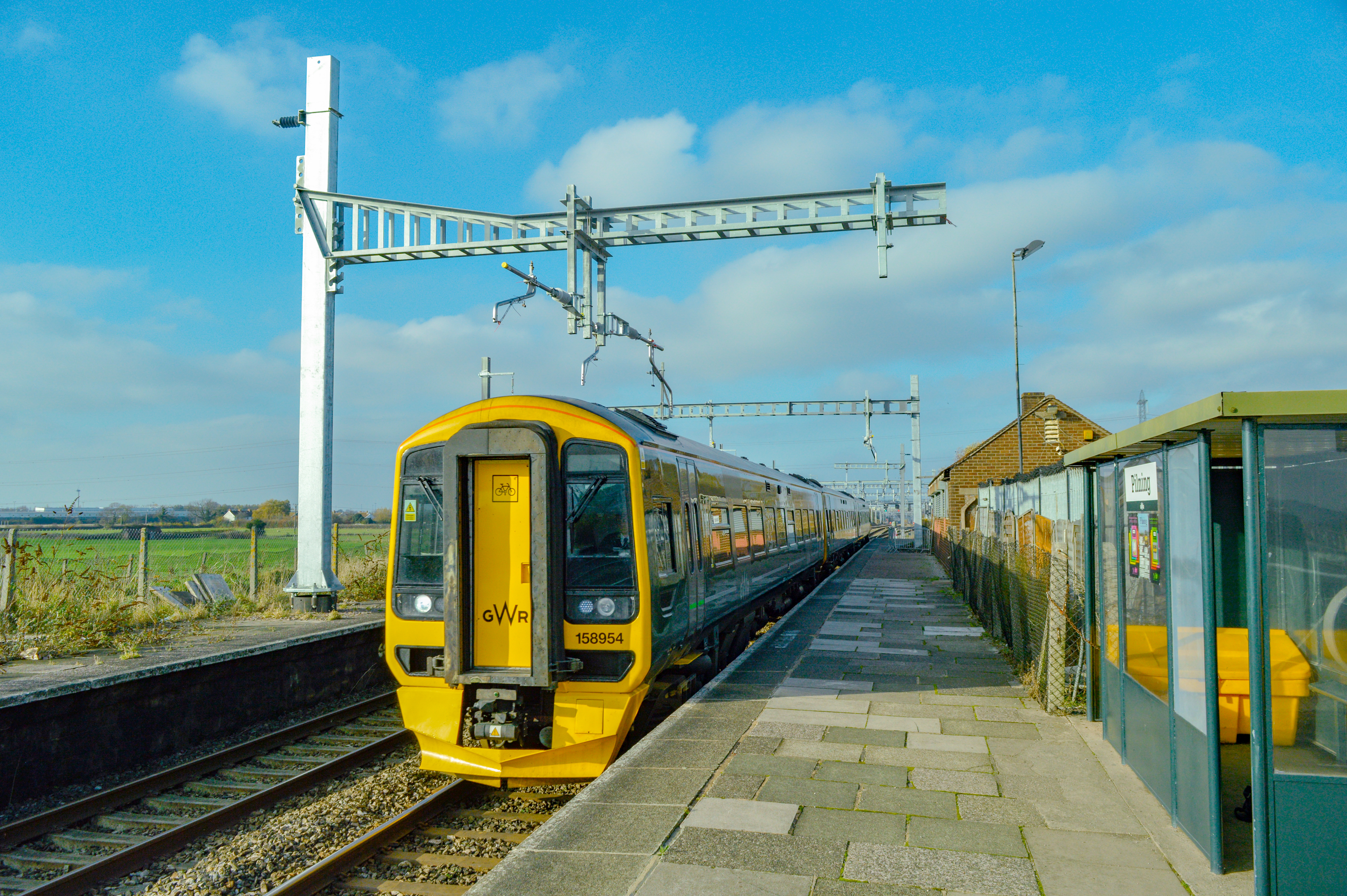
- A Great Western Railway Class 158 train passes Pilning in 2018.

General information
- Location: Pilning, South Gloucestershire; England
- Coordinates: 51.5563°N 2.6265°W
- Grid reference: ST566844
- Manager: Great Western Railway
- Platforms: 1
- Tracks: 3

Other information
- Station code: PIL
- Classification: DfT category F2

History
- Original company: Great Western Railway
- Pre-grouping: Great Western Railway
- Post-grouping: Great Western Railway

Key dates
- 8 September 1863: Opened
- 1 December 1886: Resited
- 9 July 1928: Low Level station opened
- 23 November 1964: Low Level station closed
- 29 November 1965: Closed to goods
- 5 November 2016: Westbound platform closed

Passengers
- 2021/22: ▲418
- 2022/23: ▼338
- 2023/24: ▼330
- 2024/25: ▼294
- 2025/26: ▼258
Location
Notes
- Passenger statistics from the Office of Rail and Road

Pilning railway station is a minor station on the South Wales Main Line near Pilning, South Gloucestershire, England. It is 10 miles (16 km) from Bristol Temple Meads and is the last station on the English side before the Severn Tunnel through to Wales. It is managed by Great Western Railway, who provide the two train services per week from the station.

The station was opened by the Bristol and South Wales Union Railway in 1863, but was resited in 1886 when the Severn Tunnel was opened. The station had an extensive goods yard, boasting one of the largest railway communities in the Bristol area, and operated a motorail service to Wales. The goods yard was closed in 1965, and the station buildings later demolished, with very little in the way of facilities. Passenger services also declined, to two trains per day in the 1970s and the current service level of two trains per week in 2006.

The station's footbridge was removed in 2016 as part of Great Western Main Line electrification project, meaning that only eastbound trains can now use the station. Campaigners have alleged this is part of an attempted closure by stealth, although the incident raised the station's profile nationally. Pilning is one of the least-used stations in Britain, but passenger numbers have increased in recent years due to efforts by the Pilning Station Group.

== History ==
=== Bristol and South Wales Union Railway ===
Pilning railway station first opened on 8 September 1863 when services began on the Bristol and South Wales Union Railway (BSWUR). The railway ran from Bristol Temple Meads to New Passage Pier, north of Bristol on the banks of the River Severn, where passengers could transfer onto a ferry to cross the river into Wales. The line, engineered by Isambard Kingdom Brunel, was built as single track 7 ft 1/4 in (2,140 mm) broad gauge. Pilning was 9 miles 39 chains (15.3 km) from Temple Meads, initially the fifth station along the line, between Patchway 3 miles 3 chains (4.9 km) east and New Passage 1 mile 76 chains (3.1 km) west. (Note: Intermediate stations were Lawrence Hill, Stapleton Road, Filton and Patchway. Further intermediate stations were opened at Ashley Hill in 1864 and Horfield in 1927.) There was a single platform on the north side of the line, and a siding to the south. Few details are known about this iteration of the station, nor are there any photos from its time in use. The station was 1 mile (1.6 km) east of the village of Pilning in Gloucestershire, on Pilning Street, a road between Pilning and Easter Compton, which was 1.5 miles (2.4 km) further south. The immediate area was farmland with little in the way of housing, although there was a pub, The Plough, across the road from the station. To the east the line crossed the road at a level crossing, which was operated from the station using levers. There were initially six trains per day on weekdays in each direction, with three trains per day on Sundays.

In 1868 the BSWUR was amalgamated with the Great Western Railway (GWR), which had from the beginning operated all BSWUR services; and in 1873 the line was converted to 4 ft 8 1/2 in (1,435 mm) standard gauge.

Preceding station	Historical railways	Following station
Patchway	Bristol and South Wales Union Railway (1863–1868)	New Passage
Patchway	Great Western Railway; Bristol and South Wales Union Railway (1868–1886)	New Passage

=== High Level station ===
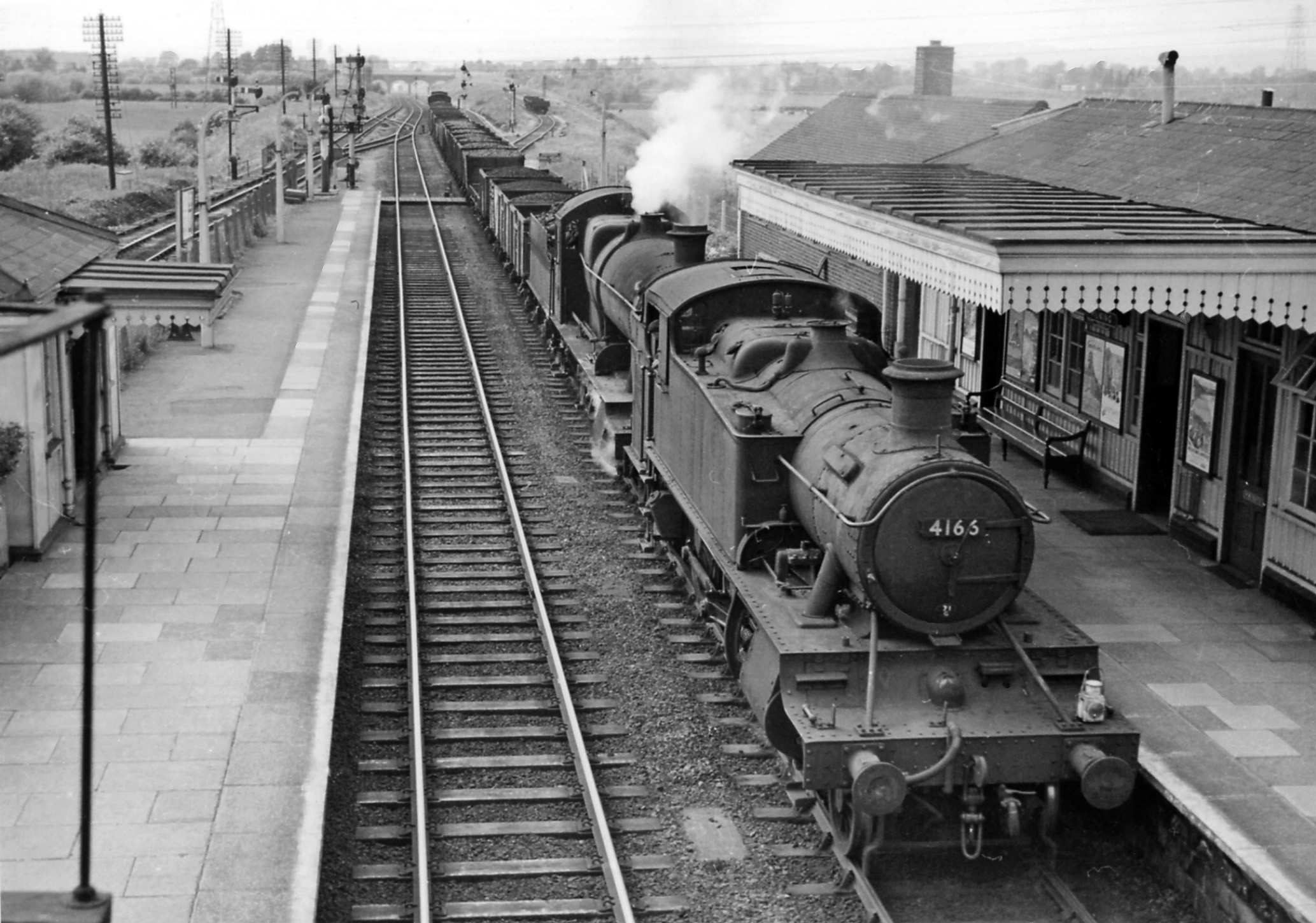
A 1955 photo showing the High Level station and its buildings. Here an eastbound coal train is being assisted up the hill by a banking locomotive.

Although the BSWUR made travel from Bristol to Wales easier, the change from train to ferry to train was inconvenient, and so plans to build a tunnel under the Severn were considered even before the railway opened. Parliamentary permission was gained in 1872, with construction beginning in 1873. GWR chairman Daniel Gooch and other directors visited Pilning in 1884 as part of an inspection tour of the works. The route to the tunnel diverged from the New Passage line 35 chains (0.70 km) east of Pilning, necessitating the building of a replacement station on the new line, approximately 100 yards (90 m) south of the original. The new station opened with the first passenger services through the tunnel on 1 December 1886. The New Passage branch, including the original station, was closed to passengers the same day, despite requests from local residents that a reduced service continue to operate. The route remained in goods use to allow trains to deliver coal to the Severn Tunnel pumping station, which was on a spur off the New Passage route. (Note: Oakley states that the track was lifted, however Mitchell and Smith, Rendall, and Yorke state that the branch remained in occasional use for coal traffic to the pumping station.)

The new station was built on an embankment, and would eventually become known as Pilning High Level. The railway crossed the road via a bridge east of the original station's level crossing, and the new station entrance adjacent to that level crossing. To the west the line went into a cutting descending towards the Severn Tunnel. The station embankment also crossed a small irrigation channel at Gumhurn Bridge. The new station was 3 chains (60 m) further along the line from Bristol at 9 miles 43 chains (15.3 km), with Patchway now 3 miles 46 chains (5.8 km) to the east, having been resited in 1885. The next station west was Severn Tunnel Junction, 6 miles 76 chains (11.2 km) away the other side of the Severn. There were two platforms, either side of the two running lines, although double-tracking to Patchway was only completed in 1887. The northern platform served eastbound trains, the southern one was for westbound trains. The station buildings were of a standard GWR design with chimneys and a fretted canopy; however this design bore no resemblance to the other stations along the line. The main station building was on the northern platform, containing the station master's office, booking office, parcels office and toilets. There was a smaller waiting room on the westbound platform. The platforms were wooden, with gas lamps and wooden bench seats. A large covered footbridge connected the platforms east of the buildings. In 1905 there were 30 staff employed by the station – 14 signalmen, 6 signalmen/porters, 8 porters, a tunnel inspector and the stationmaster – making it one of the largest railway communities in the Bristol area. Staff members were given first aid training and examinations by St John Ambulance, with an annual awards event.

The station had a large goods yard to the south and east of the station, including a cattle pen and loading bay at the east end of the northern platform. A siding between the platforms and the junction was converted to a goods loop in 1904, a westbound goods loop south of the station was laid in 1905, and a further eastbound loop just west of the station in 1906. The station had two signal boxes: Station Box was sited at the western end of the southern platform and had 54 levers; Junction Box was 0.25 miles (0.40 km) east at the eastern end of the goods yard and had 68 levers. As the final station before the Severn Tunnel, the yard was used to inspect wagons before they entered the tunnel, and also to house an emergency rescue locomotive. Heavier trains had a special brake van added, as the standard Great Western brake van had an open veranda and thus exposed the guards to choking fumes while in the tunnel. Banking locomotives were also kept at Pilning to help trains with the steep slopes between the Severn Tunnel and Patchway.

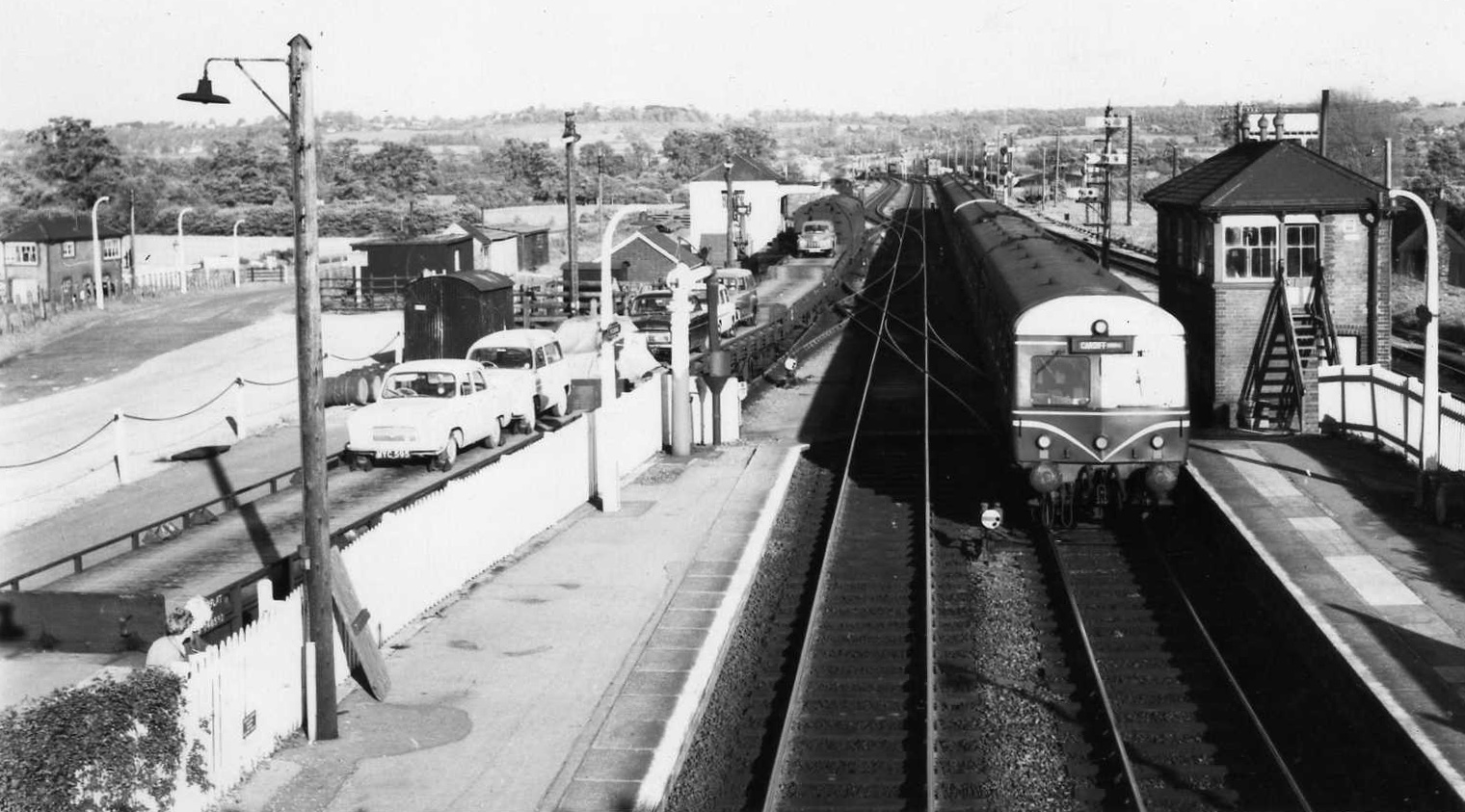
The station in 1961. A motorail train is in the siding on the left, while a train for Cardiff passes on the right. The Low Level signal box can be seen at the far left.

In 1910, the GWR introduced a Motorail service through the Severn Tunnel, operating between Pilning and Severn Tunnel Junction. Vehicles were loaded onto special wagons which were then attached to passenger trains using two dedicated shunting locomotives. Waterproof covers were available to protect cars from the conditions inside the tunnel, while passengers travelled in a coach hauled by the same train. There were usually two or three such trains per day. The service continued for more than fifty years, barring a cessation during World War I. The opening of the Severn Bridge in 1966, allowing direct road travel between Bristol and South Wales, brought about the end of the service, with the final train running on 6 October 1966.

Preceding station	Historical railways	Following station
Patchway	Great Western Railway; Bristol and South Wales Union Railway (1886–1948)	Severn Tunnel Junction

=== Pilning Low Level ===
In 1900, the GWR built a new branch from the route to New Passage, running along the banks of the Severn to the docks at Avonmouth. This allowed trains to travel via the original station at Pilning and avoid congestion along the line via central Bristol. The line was single-track throughout, but Pilning had a passing loop and two loop sidings adjacent to the line. The loop was capable of holding a train of 60 wagons, while the sidings could hold 52 and 48 wagons. A brick signal box, Pilning Branch Box, more commonly known as Low Level, was opened adjacent to the level crossing in 1917. It had ten levers controlling the crossing and the eastern end of the passing loops, the western end being controlled by a ground frame. The level crossing had manually-controlled gates, requiring the signaller to leave the signal box in order to operate them. The crossing was also at the bottom of a gradient, with train operators advised to approach it cautiously. Trains working from Wales to Avonmouth required elaborate shunting moves – there was no path between the two without reversing – and so the level crossing was frequently closed, leading to traffic jams. A new route to Avonmouth, via Henbury, was opened in 1910, but no direct connection between South Wales and Avonmouth was built until 1971.

In the early 1900s the nearby village of Severn Beach became a popular seaside resort, with a station opening there in 1922 for trains via Avonmouth. This spurred the upgrading of the line from Pilning to Avonmouth to passenger traffic: inspections occurred in 1927, approval was granted on 24 April 1928, and the first passenger services ran on 23 June 1928. The station at Pilning on this line opened on 9 July 1928, referred to variously as Pilning Halt, Pilning Low Level Halt and Pilning Low Level, although the latter was the most common. The station on the route via the Severn Tunnel was renamed Pilning High Level, with the station boards noting "Junction for Severn Beach and Avonmouth". The total cost of construction of the new stations at Pilning, Cross Hands Halt and New Passage Halt was estimated at £502.

The new Low Level station was on the site of the original station, 9 miles 39 chains (15.3 km) from Bristol Temple Meads. Patchway was the next station east, 3 miles 43 chains (5.7 km) away, while to the west Cross Hands Halt was 73 chains (1.5 km) distant. The station had a single 150 feet (46 m)-long wooden platform on the north side of the line, with no facilities or lighting. The shortness of the platform meant that only two carriages could be accommodated, and so passengers were required to travel in the correct part of the train in order to alight. Tickets were sold from the High Level station, whose stationmaster oversaw the Low Level also. The Low Level station handled parcels traffic, unlike other halts on the route. The station had no water tower, and so locomotives were required to travel to High Level to use the facilities there. A small shelter and platform lighting were added by 1959. The initial service along this loop was nine trains per day on weekdays and four on Sundays, mostly running circular trips to and from Bristol Temple Meads via Clifton Down and Patchway.

Preceding station	Historical railways	Following station
Patchway	Great Western Railway; Severn Beach Line (1928–1948)	Cross Hands Halt

=== British Rail ===
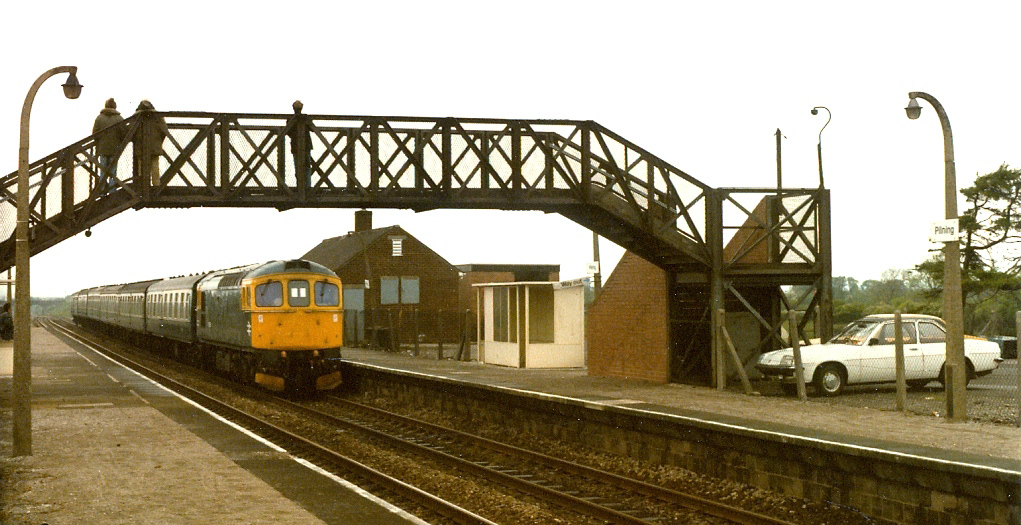
A British Rail Class 33 locomotive passes Pilning in 1982. The station buildings had been demolished by this point, with small bus stop-style shelters provided in their place.

When the railways were nationalised in 1948, Pilning came under the aegis of the Western Region of British Railways. In 1949 there were seven trains towards South Wales and eight towards Bristol from Wales each day, with two each way on Sundays. The Low Level station saw an additional five trains per day towards Bristol via Patchway, and seven per day towards Severn Beach, with some continuing to Bristol from there. Many trains via Severn Beach would terminate at Pilning Low Level. Passenger services between Severn Beach and Pilning were withdrawn on 23 November 1964, causing the closure of the Low Level platform. The line to Avonmouth continued in freight use, however in 1968 a work to rule incident precipitated the closure: a signaller at Pilning Branch Box took a sick day and train staff refused to work the crossing gates themselves. The line was officially closed on 1 September 1968 following this incident, with the Divisional Movements Manager stating it was surplus to requirements. The tracks and signal box remained in place until at least August 1970, but were eventually removed. The site is now in agricultural use, and the only remnants of the station are level crossing gates: one remaining in situ, the other now used at the Didcot Railway Centre.

The High Level station continued in use, but reverted to its original name, Pilning, on 6 May 1968. During the 1950s a brick building was built on the northern platform, and around the same time the footbridge had its roof and walls removed, leaving users exposed to the elements. The goods yard was closed on 29 November 1965, with the good loops westbound towards the tunnel cut short in February 1968 and the eastbound loop between the High Level station and the junction removed in May 1969. The Motorail loading bay was used to store a fire service emergency train for the Severn Tunnel, however this had been relocated to Severn Tunnel Junction by 1991. The Junction and Station signal boxes were closed on 15 March 1971, with control passed to Bristol Panel Signal Box at Bristol Temple Meads. Passenger services had increased slightly by this point, with nine or ten trains each direction between Bristol and Cardiff from Monday to Saturday and two trains each way on Sundays, but this increase was short-lived, and by 1973 Pilning received only one train per day in each direction. The station buildings had been boarded up by this point, and by 1982 had been demolished, with the exception of the 1950s brick building. Basic shelters were constructed on each platform as a replacement. The few stopping trains had to be timed for daylight hours, as the station lighting had been disconnected. British Rail was split into business-led sectors in the 1980s, at which time operations at Pilning passed to Regional Railways.

Preceding station	Historical railways	Following station
Patchway	Western Region of British Railways; Severn Beach Line (1948–1964)	Cross Hands Halt
Patchway	Western Region of British Railways; South Wales Main Line (1948–1982)	Severn Tunnel Junction
Patchway	Regional Railways; South Wales Main Line (1982–1997)	Severn Tunnel Junction

=== Post-privatisation ===
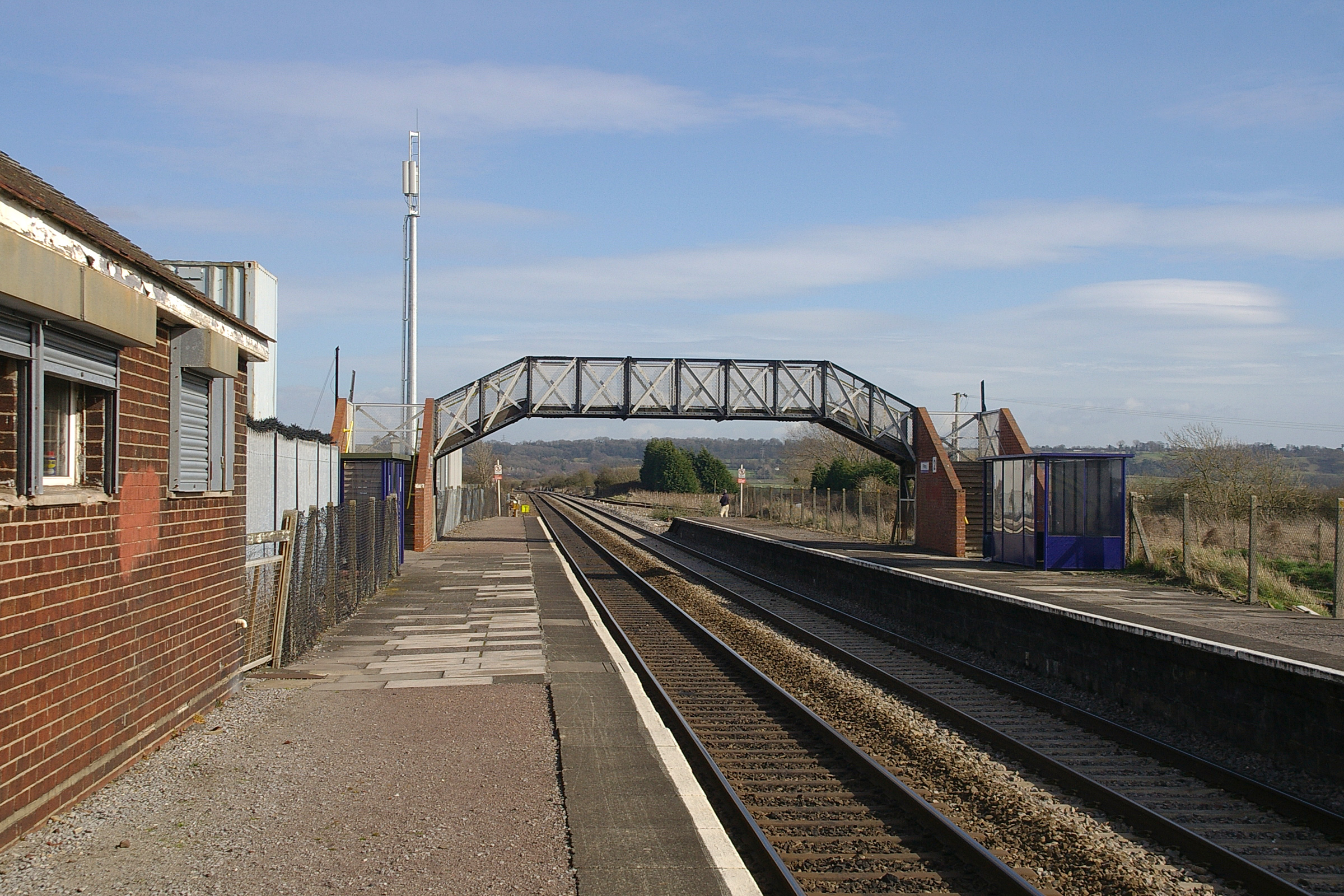
The station in 2009, view eastwards.

The British rail network was privatised in the 1990s – the infrastructure, including stations, became property of Railtrack in 1994, and were subsequently transferred to Network Rail in 2002. Bristol-area passenger services were franchised to Wales & West in 1997, which was succeeded by Wessex Trains, an arm of National Express, in 2001. The Wessex franchise was amalgamated with the Great Western franchise into the Greater Western franchise from 2006, and responsibility passed to First Great Western, a subsidiary company of FirstGroup, rebranded as Great Western Railway in 2015. Services continued at two per day under Wales & West and Wessex Trains, however the Greater Western franchise of 2006 specified only two trains per week at Pilning, and so the service was reduced: from Cardiff to Bristol on Saturday morning and back the same afternoon. The station, isolated and with a skeleton service, was one of the least used stations in the country, with less than 100 passengers per year. (Note: Annual estimated passenger usage based on sales of tickets in stated financial year(s) which end or originate at Pilning, from Office of Rail and Road statistics. Methodology may vary year on year.)

Despite the low patronage, there was local interest in the station. The Pilning Station Group, founded by local resident Jonathan King in the 1980s, campaigned for an increase in services. Upon King's death in 2014, a small plaque dedicated to him was added to the brick abutment of the footbridge. The group devised challenges for people to travel from Pilning on the morning train, get as far as possible, and then return on the evening train. The group also successfully campaigned for an extra train to call to support a local music festival.

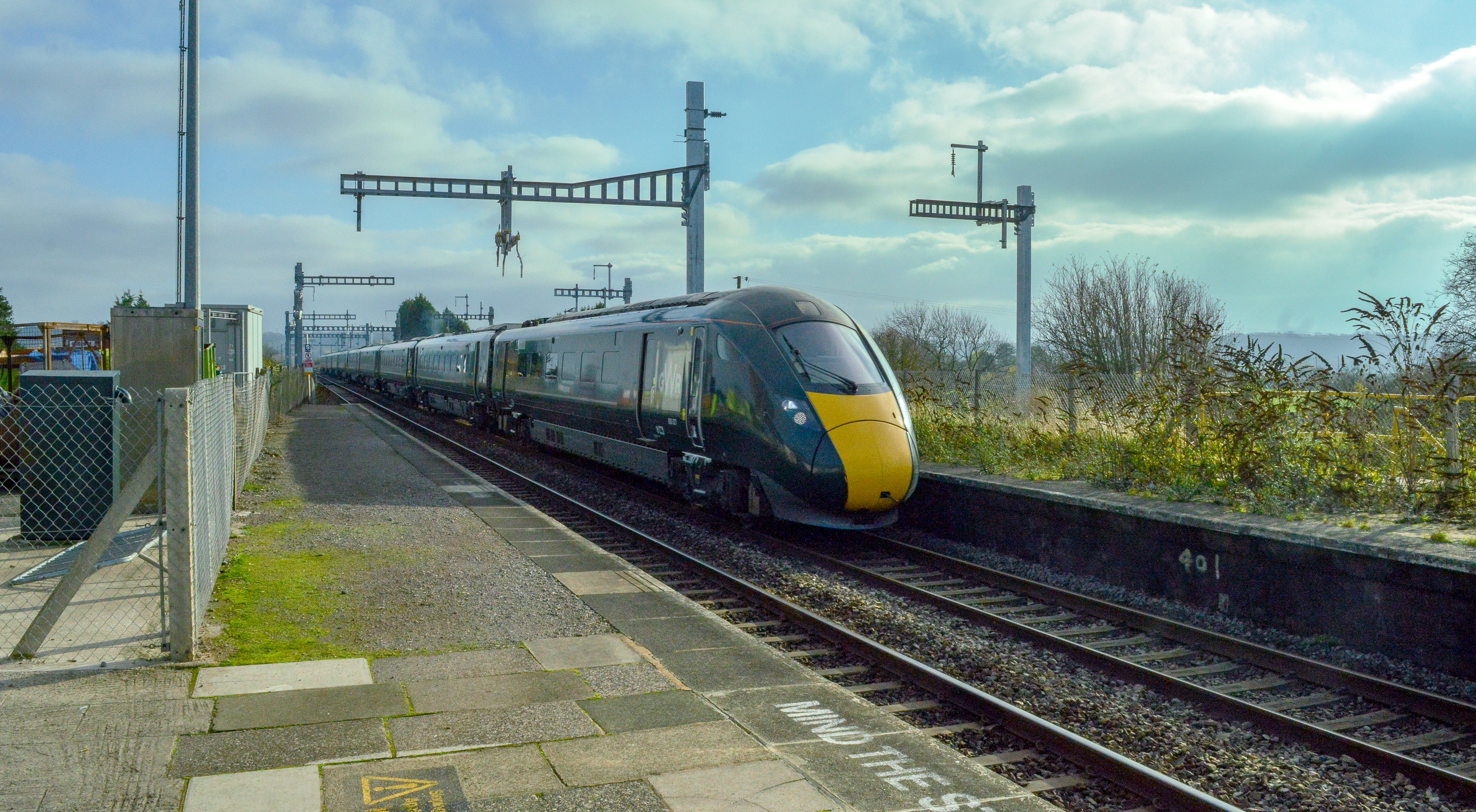
A Great Western Railway Class 800 train speeds through Pilning in 2018. The Pilning footbridge was demolished to allow trains such as this to operate on electric power from overhead wires.

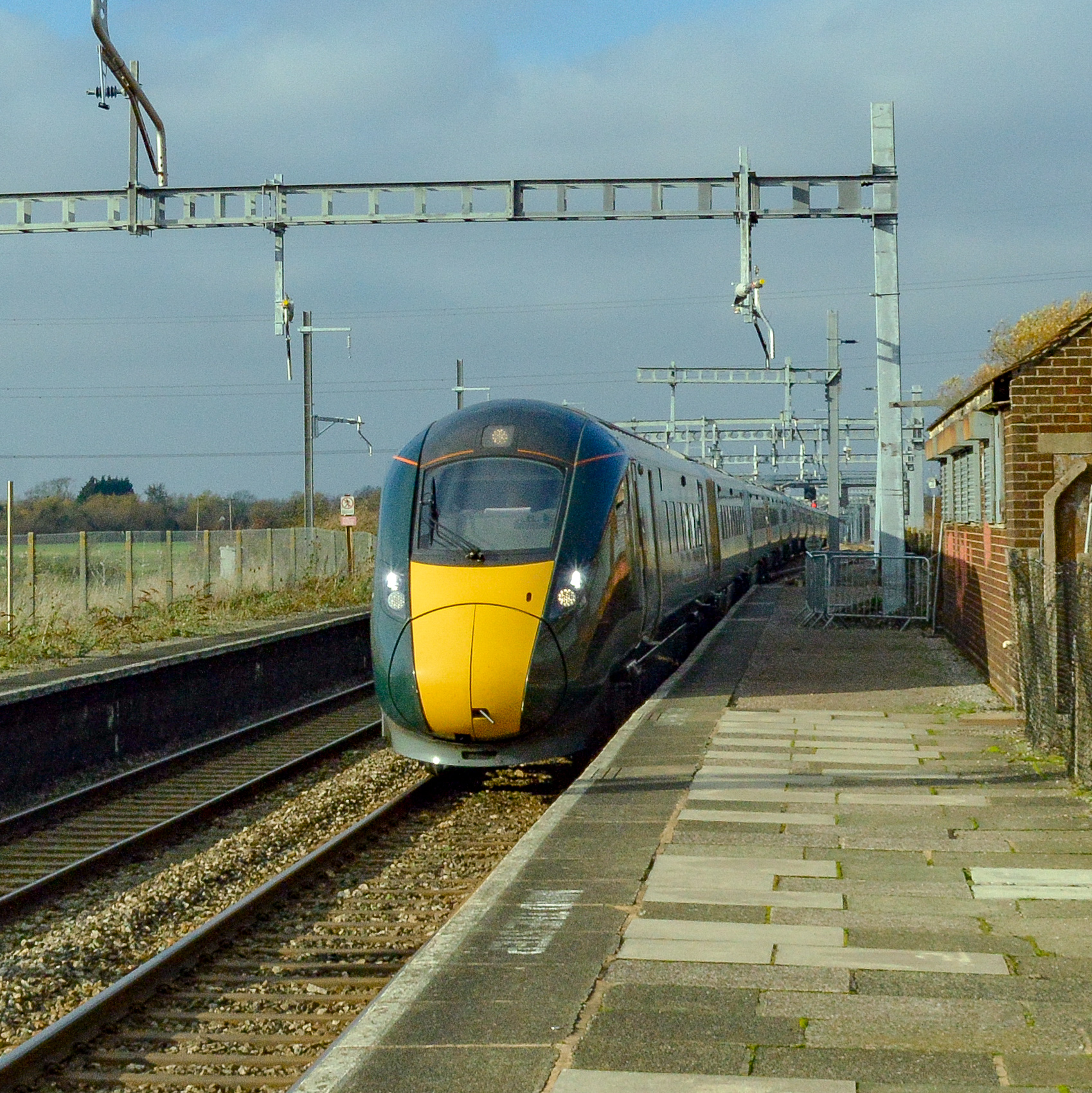
The railway through Pilning underwent electrification works as part of the 21st-century modernisation of the Great Western main line.

On 5 November 2016, the footbridge at Pilning was demolished by Network Rail as part of the Great Western Main Line electrification project, as the bridge was too low for overhead wires and the low passenger numbers did not justify a replacement. The removal of the footbridge meant that the westbound platform was no longer accessible and thus was closed, with the final train having called on 10 September. Campaigners alleged that the removal amounted to a closure by stealth, with Network Rail apologising for not consulting residents or conforming to their code of best practice. Due to trains only being able to call in the eastbound direction, a fares easement was implemented to allow westbound travel to Severn Tunnel Junction in order to return eastbound to Pilning, with the westbound service being replaced by a second eastbound service. Geoff Marshall and Vicki Pipe visited Pilning in 2017 as part of their All the Stations project, attracting local media attention to the station's status. There was subsequently a campaign for Pilning to receive the footbridge from Angel Road, following that station's closure in May 2019, however Network Rail stated that there was no financial justification for replacing the bridge. Local rail group Friends of Suburban Bristol Railways claim that Network Rail saved £658,000 by removing the bridge, and that a replacement would cost in the region of £5,000,000–£7,000,000. The Severn Tunnel electrification works made use of the Network Rail compound at Pilning, were completed in 2020, having been delayed due to corrosion in the tunnel.

Preceding station	Historical railways	Following station
Patchway	Wales & West; South Wales Main Line (1997–2001)	Severn Tunnel Junction
Patchway	Wessex Trains; South Wales Main Line (2001–2006)	Severn Tunnel Junction

== Incidents ==
Railway staff have suffered injuries or death at Pilning; in 1893, signalman George Hann sustained severe cuts to the neck and throat after being hit by shards of glass from an unwanted bottle of lemon squash, which had been thrown from a passing train and smashed against the signal box's woodwork. A platelayer was hit by a train in 1908, suffering a broken arm; and in 1942 track worker George Daniel Garland was killed while spreading ashes – witnesses stated that there was no lookout and that high winds prevented the train being heard. Two staff are also known to have died at Pilning from natural causes: train driver James Winnicombe, who collapsed on the footplate in 1929; and track worker John Holbrook, who died in a workmen's cabin in 1932.

Passengers have also been the victims of accidents. On 31 May 1874, a seven-year-old child, Arthur Edward Claypole, and a nurse, Maria Hall, fell from an express train. Claypole had been leaning on the door when it came open causing him to fall out, with Hall jumping out after him. Claypole died from the injuries sustained. An insufficient door fastening was cited as the cause of the incident.

A major incident occurred in June 1933, when a London, Midland and Scottish Railway excursion train from Worsley to Barnstaple caught fire after passing through the Severn Tunnel. The fire, which started in the restaurant car, spread to two other coaches. The train was stopped at Pilning, where the three burning carriages were removed to a siding and allowed to burn, also setting fire to the grass on the embankment. There were no injuries among the passengers; an attendant was injured while attempting to rescue property from the burning carriages. The rest of the train continued to Barnstaple and arrived an hour late, but 70 passengers from the affected carriages had to be carried by a later train.

== Description ==
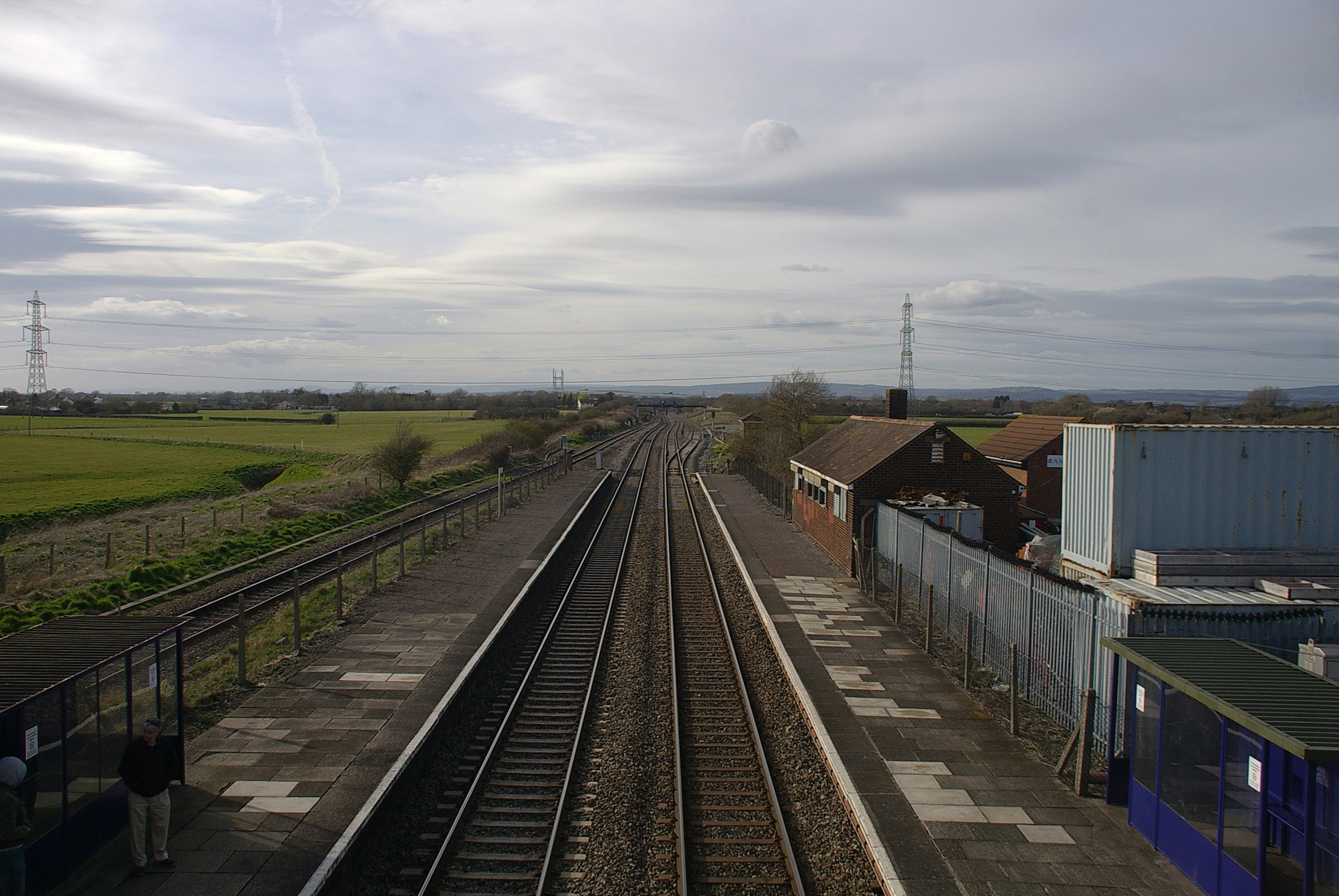
View westbound from Pilning towards the Severn Tunnel, prior to electrification works. The goods loops can be seen to the left and right.

Pilning railway station is located in the Pilning area of South Gloucestershire, 2 miles (3.2 km) north of the Bristol conurbation. The surrounding area is primarily farmland, with the village itself some 3/4 mile (1.2 km) further west. The station is on the South Wales Main Line between Bristol Parkway and Newport (South Wales), 9 miles 42 chains (15.3 km) from Bristol Temple Meads and 116 miles 51 chains (187.7 km) from London Paddington via Bristol Parkway. West of Pilning, the railway descends into a cutting and then into the Severn Tunnel, emerging in Wales at Severn Tunnel Junction, 6 miles 76 chains (11.2 km) away. The next station to the east is Patchway, 3 miles 46 chains (5.8 km) distant. The station sits on an embankment, with a bridge over the road east of the station and over an irrigation channel at the west.

The railway through Pilning has three tracks: from north to south these are the Up Tunnel towards Bristol; the Down Tunnel towards Wales; and then the Down Pilning Loop, also towards Wales. A fourth track, the Up Pilning Loop, ends just west of the station. All three tracks through the station are unidirectional. The two Tunnel lines have a 90 miles per hour (140 km/h) speed limit, while the loop has a speed limit of 40 miles per hour (64 km/h). The line is electrified using overhead wires. Despite there being three tracks, Pilning only has a single platform in use, Platform 1, on the north side of the line. This is 120 metres (130 yd) long and serves trains towards Bristol. The old down platform, Platform 2, sits between the Down Tunnel and Down Pilning Loop, but is no longer accessible to the public. It is 121 metres (132 yd) long. There is an old brick station building on Platform 1 but it is not in railway use. Infrastructure owner Network Rail has a compound at the station.

Facilities at Pilning are extremely basic: the platform, which is covered by CCTV, has a bus stop-style shelter on it but no seats. Customer help points on the platform and timetable boards provide service information, but there are no facilities for buying tickets. The car park is permanently closed as of 2024 and newly installed locked gates prevent access to the site other than on foot or cycle, for which there are four stands. The payphone has also now been removed. Access is via a long ramp from the main road.

Pilning is consistently one of the least-used stations in Britain, recording fewer than 50 annual passengers several times between 1997 and 2015. Numbers have since increased by a factor of ten, thanks in part to campaigns by the Pilning Station Group; however as of 2017/18 it is still the 35th least used station of the 2,559 in Britain.

== Service ==
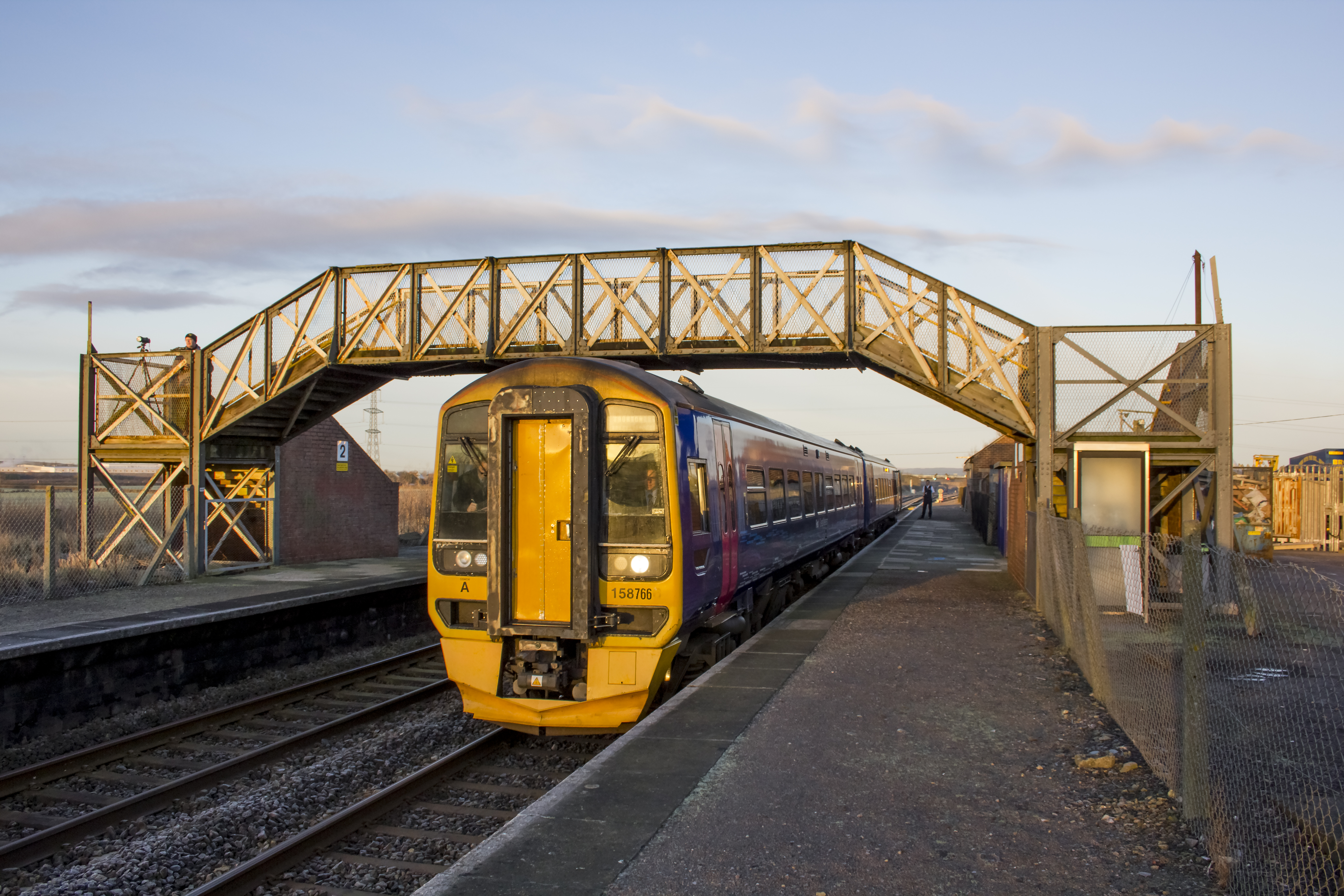
Only two trains per week call at Pilning. In 2016, First Great Western Class 158 DMU 158766 calls with the 0834 to Taunton.

Pilning is managed by Great Western Railway, which operate all services from the station. A parliamentary service of two trains per week operates; as of the December 2019 timetable these are the Saturday 08:33 and 14:33 services from Cardiff Central to Penzance and Taunton respectively. The standard journey time to Bristol Temple Meads is 20 minutes, and to Taunton is 80 minutes. Services at Pilning are formed using GWR 158 and 166 diesel multiple-unit trains. Due to there being no westbound trains, a fares easement is in place allowing passengers to travel to Severn Tunnel Junction in order to return eastbound to Pilning. Rail replacement buses do not call at Pilning; in the event of engineering works taxis are provided instead.

Great Western Railway services between London Paddington and South Wales pass through Pilning non-stop throughout the day, two trains per hour in each direction on weekdays, one train per hour at weekends. Other Great Western Railway services between Cardiff and Taunton or Portsmouth Harbour also pass through non-stop, again two trains per hour in each direction on weekdays, one train per hour at weekends. Freight trains also operate through Pilning, roughly two per hour each way, with many transporting coal between Bristol and South Wales.

Preceding station	National Rail	Following station
Severn Tunnel Junction	Great Western Railway; Taunton – Cardiff Central (Saturdays only, Eastbound only, limited service)	Patchway

== Future ==
Service improvements at Pilning are supported by both the Pilning Station Group and Friends of Suburban Bristol Railways. While Severn Beach railway station is nearby, Pilning potentially offers much quicker access to Bristol and Wales. The campaigners note that 25,000 jobs are due to be created in the area as part of the Westgate development, and that a new junction on the M49 motorway could allow for a park and ride-type station "Pilning Parkway". Requests for extra services have however been rebuffed, with Great Western Railway stating that Pilning's location on the main line means that stopping trains negatively impact journey times for long-distance services. The South East Wales and West of England Business Link, a plan to improve connectivity between Newport and Weston-super-Mare, proposes replacing the existing station with one 900 metres (980 yd) further west where the B4055 Cross Hands Road crosses the railway. This site is within the village of Pilning, offering better road access and bus interchange. The railway at this point is four-track, allowing stopping trains to be overtaken by fast trains. The plan won the Oliver Lovell Award for best new group at the 2018 Railfuture awards.

There are expected to be increases in the number of trains passing through Pilning in the years to 2043, with a predicted service of ten passenger trains and up to two freight trains per hour in each direction. Network Rail estimate that 15 trains per hour in each direction could use the route if European Train Control System signalling was implemented.
