= Cross Hands Halt railway station =

Disused railway station in Cross Hands, South Gloucestershire

Cross Hands Halt
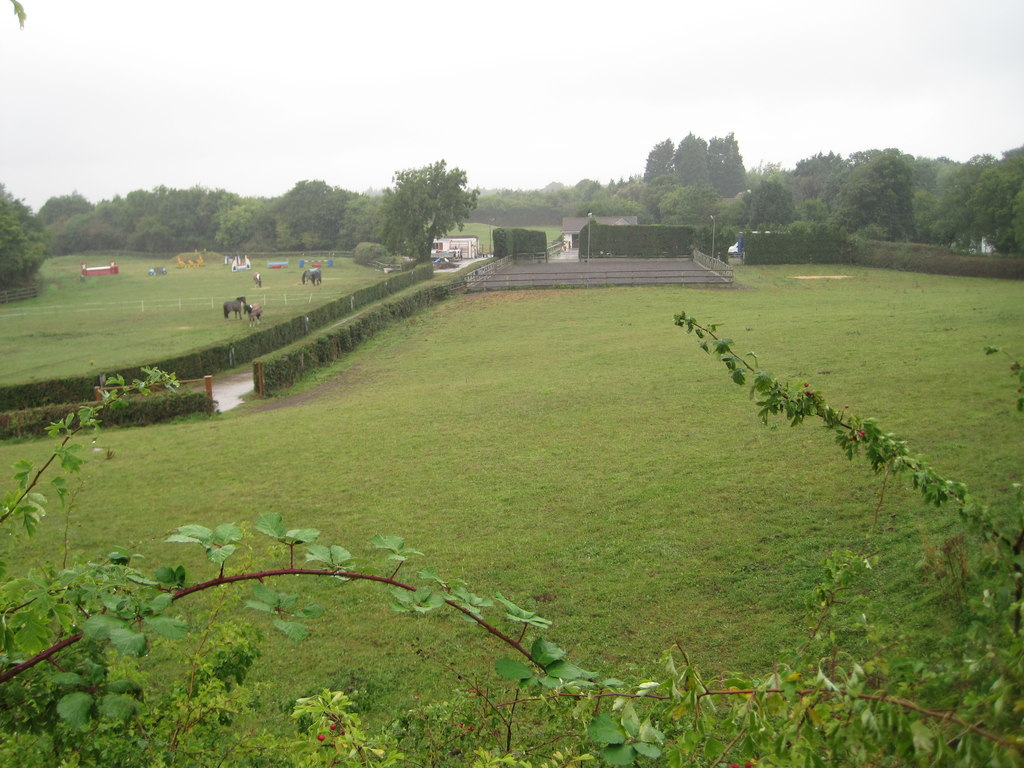
- The site of the station in 2013

General information
- Location: Pilning, South Gloucestershire; England
- Coordinates: 51.5654°N 2.6418°W
- Grid reference: ST 55610 85364
- Platforms: 1

Other information
- Status: Disused

History
- Original company: Great Western Railway
- Post-grouping: Great Western Railway

Key dates
- 9 July 1928: Opened
- 23 November 1964: Closed
Location

Cross Hands Halt railway station served Pilning, South Gloucestershire, England from 1928 to 1964 on the Severn Beach Line.

== History ==
The station opened on 9 July 1928 by the Great Western Railway. Before the Severn Tunnel was built, this line was the main line to South Wales via the New Passage ferry. The station was closed to both passengers and goods traffic on 23 November 1964.

Preceding station	Historical railways	Following station
Pilning Low Level; Line and station closed	Great Western Railway; Severn Beach line	New Passage Pier; Line and station closed
