= Patchway railway station =

Railway station in Gloucestershire, England

Patchway
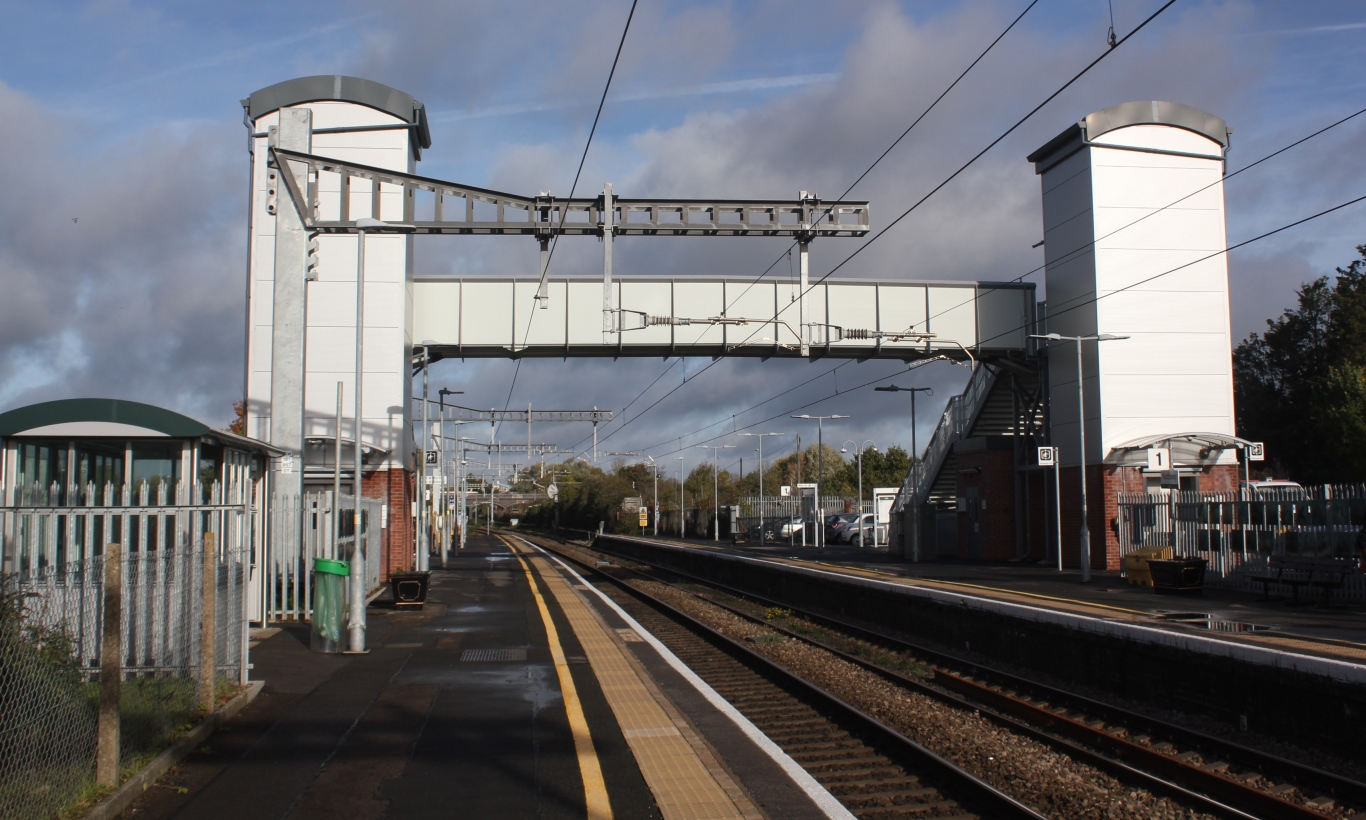
- View north from the southern end of the station

General information
- Location: Patchway, South Gloucestershire; England
- Coordinates: 51.5258°N 2.5623°W
- Grid reference: ST610809
- Manager: Great Western Railway
- Platforms: 2

Other information
- Station code: PWY
- Classification: DfT category F1

History
- Original company: Bristol and South Wales Union Railway
- Pre-grouping: Great Western Railway
- Post-grouping: Great Western Railway

Key dates
- 8 September 1863: Opened
- 10 August 1885: Resited and renamed Patchway and Stoke Gifford
- 27 October 1908: Renamed Patchway
- 5 July 1965: Closed to goods traffic

Passengers
- 2020/21: ▼12,392
- 2021/22: ▲50,756
- 2022/23: ▲77,776
- 2023/24: ▲88,008
- 2024/25: ▲94,176
Location
Notes
- Passenger statistics from the Office of Rail and Road

Patchway railway station is on the South Wales Main Line, serving the town of Patchway and village of Stoke Gifford in South Gloucestershire, England. It is 6 miles (10 km) from Bristol Temple Meads. Its three letter station code is PWY. It is managed by Great Western Railway, who provide all train services at the station; there is generally a train every hour in each direction between Cardiff Central and Taunton.

The station was opened by the Bristol and South Wales Union Railway in 1863 with a single platform, 0.5 miles (0.8 km) west of the current location, but was resited in 1885 when the line was widened to double track. The station once had large buildings and a goods yard, but these were demolished in the late 20th century, with small brick shelters built in their place. The line through Patchway has recently been electrified as part of the 21st-century modernisation of the Great Western Main Line.

== Description ==
Patchway railway station is located in the Patchway area of South Gloucestershire, within the Bristol conurbation. There is a large Rolls-Royce industrial area to the west of the station, while the area to the north and east is primarily residential. To the south is a large amount of railway land, including the Filton Triangle depot. The station is on the South Wales Main Line between Bristol Parkway and Newport (South Wales), and just off the Cross Country Route north of Filton Abbey Wood and the east end of the Henbury Loop Line. It is 5 miles 77 chains (9.6 km) from Bristol Temple Meads and 114 miles 5 chains (183.6 km) from London Paddington via Bristol Parkway. (Note: Railways in the United Kingdom are, for historical reasons, measured in miles and chains. There are 80 chains to the mile.) The station is just north of Patchway Junctions 1 and 2, where the lines from Bristol Parkway, Filton Abbey Wood and Henbury converge. The next station east is Bristol Parkway, the next station south is Filton Abbey Wood and the next station west is Pilning. (Note: Passenger services do not currently use the Henbury Loop Line.)

The station is on a rough north–south alignment, curving towards the west at the north end. There are two platforms, separated by two running lines and connected by an open footbridge. Platform 1, on the east side of the station and adjacent to the Up Tunnel track, is for trains towards Filton Abbey Wood and Bristol Parkway. Platform 2, on the west side and adjacent to the Down Tunnel track, is for trains towards Pilning. Both platforms are 121 metres (132 yd) long, and the tracks have a speed limit of 90 miles per hour (140 km/h). The line through Patchway has a loading gauge of W8, and handles over 15 million train tonnes per year. The line through Patchway has recently been electrified as part of the 21st-century modernisation of the Great Western Main Line.

The main access to the station is from Station Road to the east; however, there is also a set of steps and a turnstile into the industrial estate to the west. Facilities at the station are minimal – there are small brick shelters on each platform, but no facilities for buying tickets. There are customer help points, giving next train information for both platforms. A small car park with 15 spaces, and racks for four bicycles, is on the east side of the station on Station Road. CCTV cameras are in operation at the station. Step-free access is available to both platforms following completion of a new footbridge with lifts.

From 2002 to 2014, annual passenger numbers at Patchway more than quintupled, from 16,898 to 92,540, and the station was noted in 2013 as having a high growth trend. However, these numbers are still fairly low; Patchway is the 1,730th busiest station in Great Britain (of 2,540) and the fifth busiest station in South Gloucestershire, busier only than Pilning. (Note: Annual estimated passenger usage based on sales of tickets in stated financial year(s) which end or originate at Patchway, from Office of Rail and Road statistics. Methodology may vary year on year.)

== Services ==
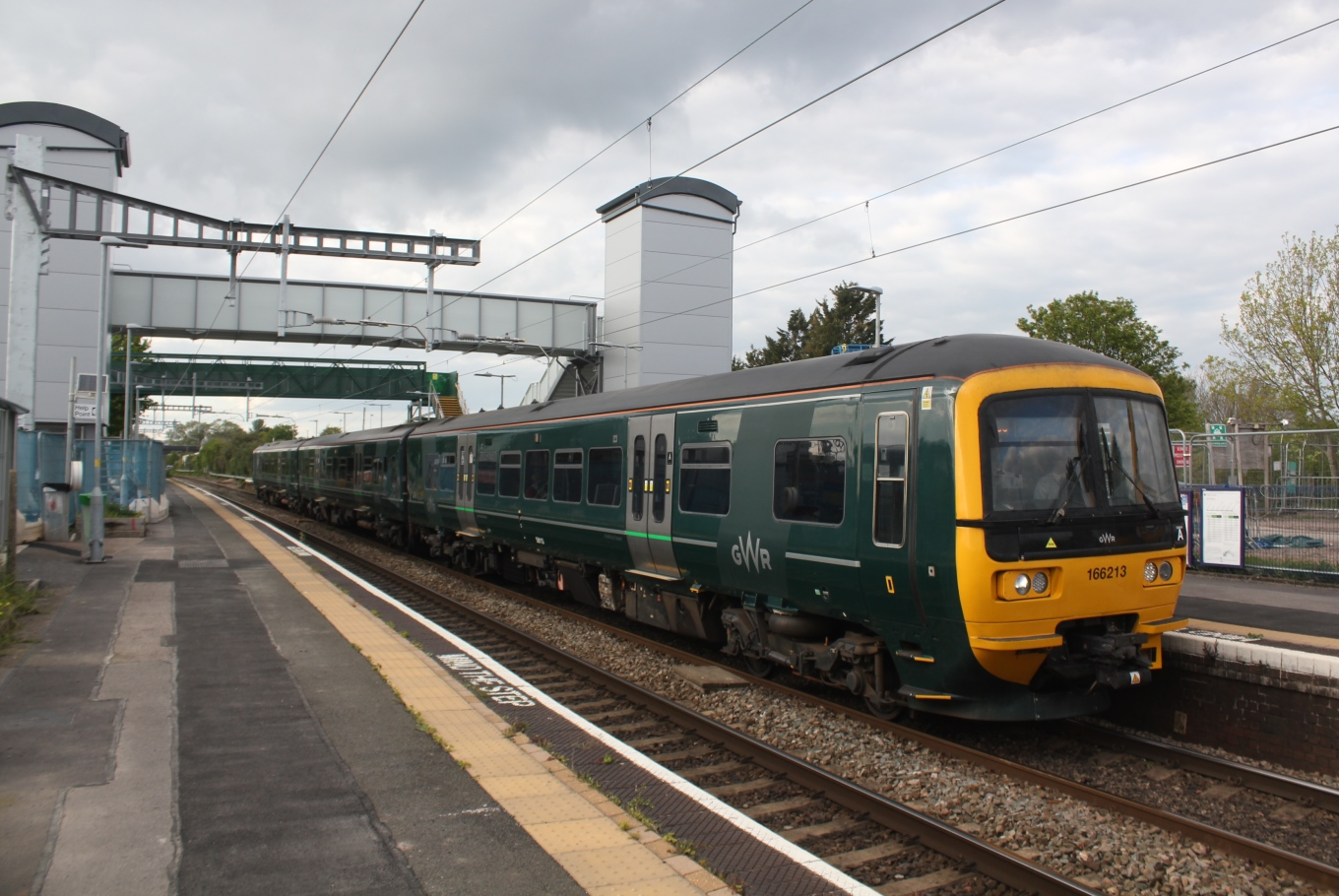
A Class 166 with a Portsmouth Harbour service

Patchway is managed by Great Western Railway, which operates all services from the station. The basic service from Monday to Friday is one train per hour in each direction between Cardiff Central and Taunton, with some trains extended beyond Taunton to Exeter St Davids, Paignton, Plymouth and Penzance. In addition, there is one early morning service to Portsmouth Harbour and a late night service to Westbury, with similar return workings. On Saturdays, there is a similar level of service throughout most of the day, with one train per hour in each direction between Cardiff and Taunton. On Sundays, a more limited service operates with roughly one train every three hours between Cardiff and Westbury, with trains terminating at either Portsmouth Harbour, Brighton or Warminster. Throughout each day, Great Western Railway services between London Paddington and South Wales pass through non-stop, with two trains per hour in each direction on weekdays and one train per hour at weekends.

All trains southbound call next at Filton Abbey Wood, and almost every train westbound calls next at Severn Tunnel Junction. Despite being the next station along the South Wales Main Line, there is only one weekday service which calls at both Patchway and Bristol Parkway, that being an early morning service from Taunton to Cardiff; there are only two trains per week which call at both Patchway and Pilning.

The services described above are formed using Class 158, 165, 166 diesel multiple-unit trains and Class 800 and Class 802 bi-mode multiple unit trains. Class 43 locomotives was formerly used on the service before it was withdrawn.

The standard journey time to Bristol Temple Meads is 13 minutes and 45 minutes to Cardiff Central.

Preceding station	National Rail	Following station
Filton Abbey Wood	Great Western Railway; Taunton - Cardiff Central	Severn Tunnel Junction
Filton Abbey Wood	Great Western Railway; Portsmouth Harbour - Cardiff Central	Severn Tunnel Junction

== History ==
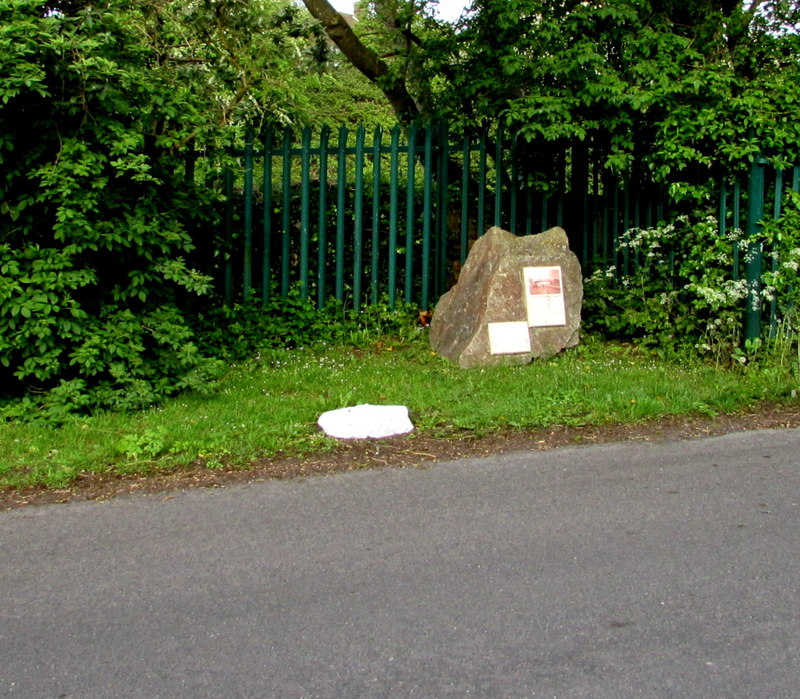
A boulder marks the site of the original station.

Patchway railway station first opened on 8 September 1863 when services began on the Bristol & South Wales Union Railway (BSWUR), which ran from Bristol Temple Meads to New Passage Pier, north of Bristol on the banks of the River Severn. At New Passage, passengers were transferred to a ferry to cross the Severn to continue on into Wales. The line, engineered by Isambard Kingdom Brunel, was built as single track 7 ft 1/4 in (2,140 mm) broad gauge. Patchway was 6 miles 37 chains (10.4 km) from Temple Meads, adjacent to the Bristol to Gloucester road, what is now the A38 Gloucester Road. The station was only a small structure and very little is known about it. There were initially six trains per day on weekdays in each direction, with three trains per day on Sundays. The BSWUR was amalgamated with the Great Western Railway (GWR), which had from the beginning operated all BSWUR services, in 1868; in 1873, the line was converted to 1,435 mm (4 ft 8 1/2 in) standard gauge. Although the line made travel from Bristol to Wales easier, the change from train to ferry to train was inconvenient and so a tunnel was built under the Severn. To cope with the anticipated increase in demand, it was decided that the line should be increased to twin track. However, the gradient between Pilning and Patchway, 1 in 68, was considered undesirably steep for trains heading up the hill towards Bristol, particularly for heavy coal trains, and so a three-mile deviation was built with a 1 in 100 gradient between Pilning and a point south of Patchway. Trains uphill towards Bristol would use the new line, while trains downhill towards Wales would continue to use the steeper, original track. The deviation left the two tracks at Patchway at significantly different levels, and so made the original site impractical for a station. The station was rebuilt 40 chains (0.80 km) south along the line at its present site, 5 miles 77 chains (9.6 km) from Bristol Temple Meads. A boulder and information board marks the site of the original station.

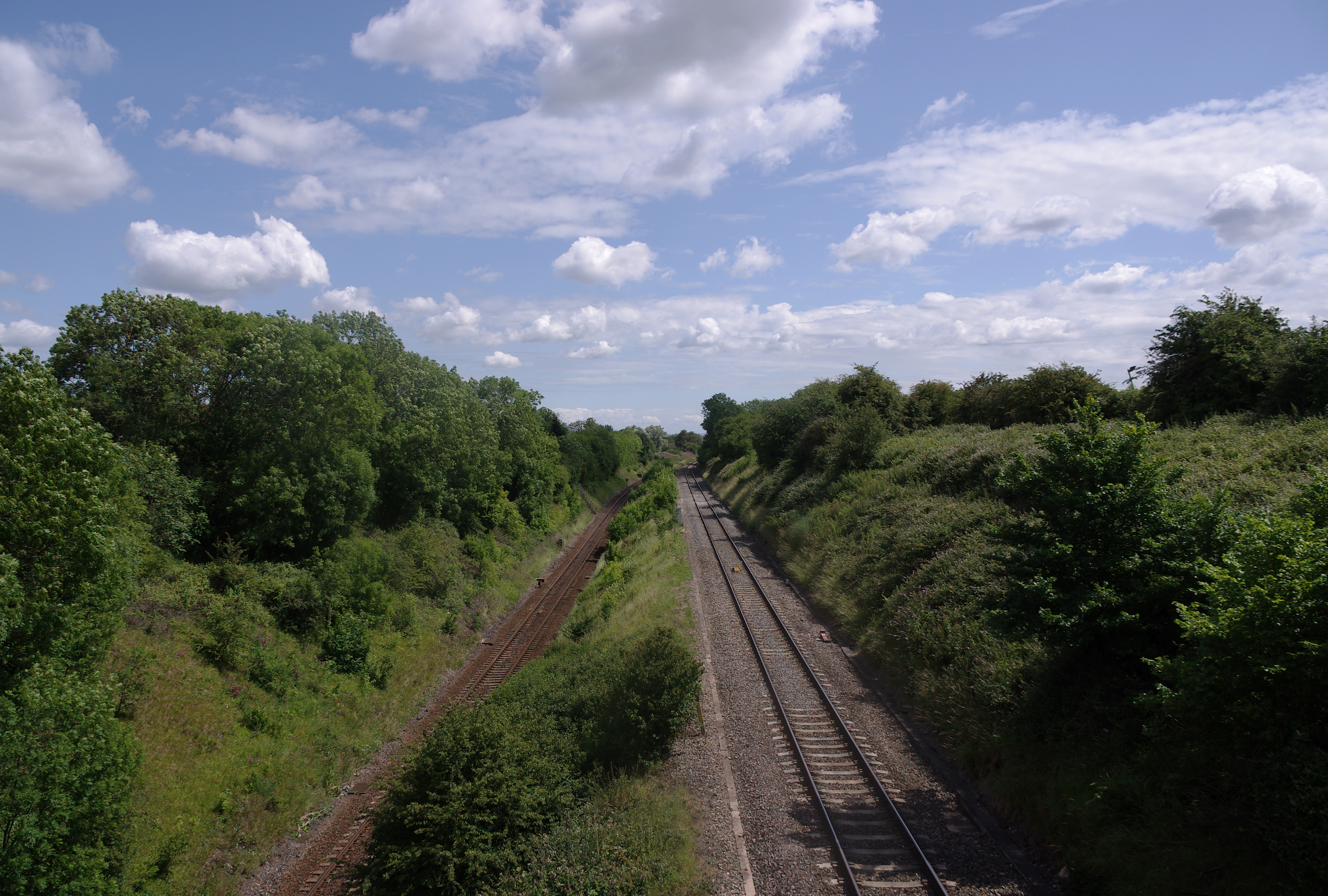
The original Patchway railway station was 40 chains (0.80 km) west of the current site. It was abandoned when a new, less steep, track (left) was built for trains from Wales towards Bristol.

The new station opened on 10 August 1885, and was originally known as Patchway & Stoke Gifford, but reverted to Patchway from 27 October 1908. The station was on a north–south alignment and had two platforms, separated by two running lines, with a third line, a goods loop, behind the western platform. There was a goods yard to the south of the station on the eastern side, with an adjacent signal box. As now, the eastern platform was for trains towards Bristol, the western platform for trains towards Wales. The station buildings were of a standard 1880s GWR design, with tall chimneys and fretted wooden canopies. The main building was on the eastern platform, containing the booking office, toilets and waiting rooms. A matching brick shelter with canopy was built on the western platform. The eastern platform also had a bicycle house at the northern end. A large covered and glazed footbridge linked the two platforms. The goods yard included two sidings: a short, south-facing one adjacent to a loading dock; and a longer north-facing one. There was also a weigh bridge and a coal office. At the north end of the station was a south-facing siding and an oil store. The station did not have a dedicated approach road, as it was adjacent to a road connecting Gloucester Road to the west and Gypsy Patch Lane to the south; this road subsequently became known as Station Road. At the time of construction, the station was mostly surrounded by fields, with the Bristol conurbation almost 3 miles (5 km) away.

In 1900, almost all trains from London to Wales travelled via Bath and Bristol, with some still routed via Gloucester. However, the final 15 miles (24 km) to Bristol were relatively slow and congested, so a new route was built further north; the GWR's Badminton Line, now part of the South Wales Main Line, ran from Wootton Bassett Junction to a junction just south of Patchway. The new line opened in 1903 and allowed faster services to Wales. There was a new triangular junction between Patchway and Filton, with the new line coming in from the east. As part of the work, the station signal box was closed, replaced by a larger one closer to the junction on 19 October 1902. The new signal box would later become one of only a few to be double glazed, due to the noise from jet engine testing from the Bristol Siddeley Aero-Engines factory (now the Rolls-Royce factory) opposite the box. The Henbury Loop Line opened in 1910, connecting Avonmouth to the main lines south of Patchway. From 1928, some trains from Bristol would travel in loops via Patchway and Severn Beach.

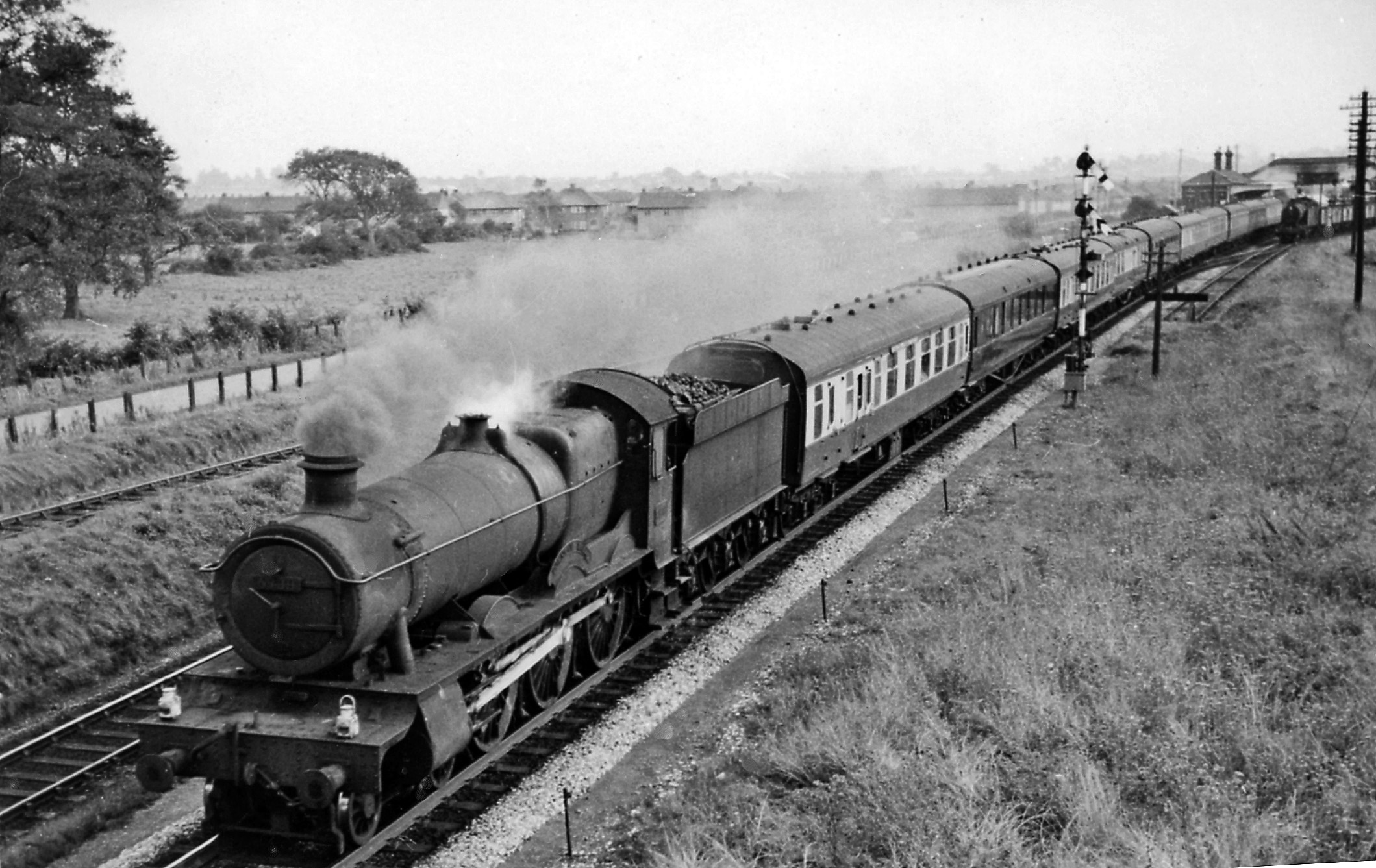
A passenger train passes west through Patchway in 1958. In the background on the right, a freight train can be seen using the goods loop.

When the railways were nationalised in 1948, Patchway came under the aegis of the Western Region of British Railways. In 1949, there were 11 trains towards South Wales and 13 towards Bristol each weekday, with three trains per day in each direction on Sundays. However, by 1965, this had reduced to eight trains on weekdays towards South Wales and six towards Bristol, with no Sunday service. Traffic levels fell; the station was closed to goods traffic on 5 July 1965 and subsequently had all staff withdrawn on 14 October 1968. The goods loop was taken up and the station buildings demolished, replaced by small brick shelters. The structure of the footbridge remained, but the roof was removed. The goods yard was repurposed as vehicle storage.

In 1974, when the Local Government Act 1972 came into effect, the southern part of Gloucestershire, including the district of Patchway, became part of the new county of Avon. Avon was disbanded in 1996, with the region now governed by South Gloucestershire council.

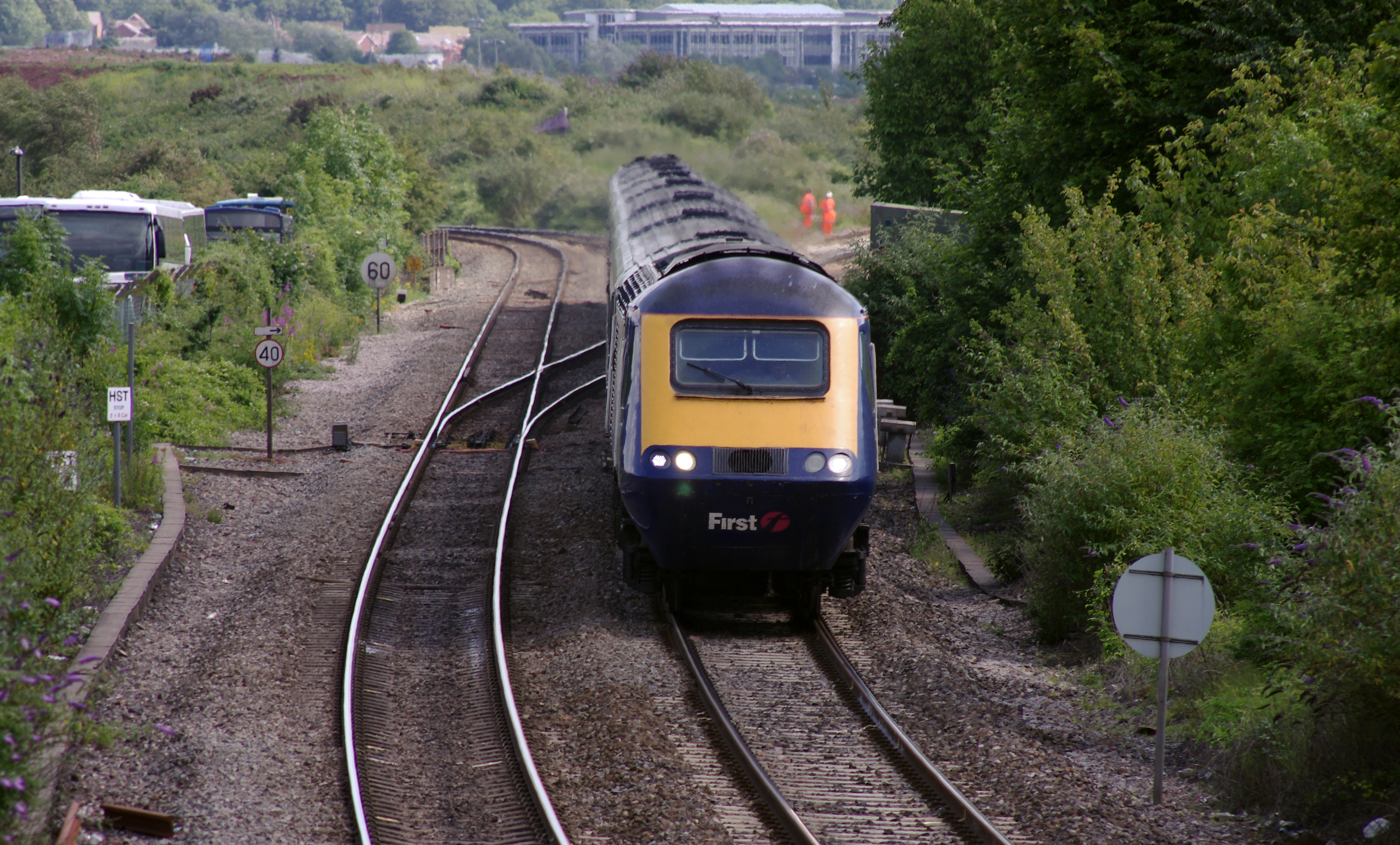
South of Patchway is Patchway Junction, where the lines from London, Bristol and Avonmouth converge.

British Rail was split into business-led sectors in the 1980s; at which time, operations at Patchway passed to Regional Railways. When the railway was privatised in 1997, local services were franchised to Wales & West, which was succeeded by Wessex Trains in 2001. The Wessex franchise was amalgamated with the Great Western franchise into the Greater Western franchise from 2006 and responsibility passed to First Great Western that was later rebranded as Great Western Railway in 2015. From December 2006, Virgin CrossCountry began operating a single daily service from Newcastle to Cardiff Central, via Bristol Temple Meads and Patchway. This service was taken over by Arriva CrossCountry when the CrossCountry franchise changed hands in 2007, and then replaced by a daily service each direction between Cardiff Central and Manchester Piccadilly.

Since the mid-2000s, the Severnside Community Rail Partnership have been working to enhance Patchway station. One of the first acts was installing new community notice boards. A local working group was formed to adopt the station and the group negotiated with Rolls-Royce to use their CCTV system to cover the station. A successful bid was made to the Department for Transport's Access for All scheme, which provided for improved signage, lighting and seats. A station garden was created in partnership with nearby Patchway Community College and two decorative mosaics were installed. The disused railway land adjacent to the station was cleared through a Community Payback scheme.

As part of work to electrify the line passing through the station, the footbridge was replaced. A new accessible footbridge with lifts at either side was opened in May 2021.

Preceding station	Historical railways	Following station
Filton	Bristol & South Wales Union Railway (1863–1868)	Pilning
Filton	Great Western Railway; Bristol & South Wales Union Line (1868–1903) (Note: There is some ambiguity about exactly when the first Filton railway station closed and Filton Junction railway station opened. Butt's 1995 book states 1886, but Oakley and Maggs both state 1903. 1903 would tie in with the new station being built as a junction for the GWR's Badminton Line, whereas 1886 would mean an entirely new station was built only months after the original station had a second platform built.)	Pilning
Filton Junction	Great Western Railway; Bristol & South Wales Union Line (1903–1948)	Pilning
Filton Junction	Western Region of British Railways; South Wales Main Line (1948–1982)	Pilning
Filton Junction	Regional Railways; South Wales Main Line (1982–1996)	Pilning
Filton Abbey Wood	Regional Railways; South Wales Main Line (1996–1997)	Pilning
Filton Abbey Wood	Wales & West; South Wales Main Line (1997–2001)	Pilning
Filton Abbey Wood	Wessex Trains; South Wales Main Line (2001-2006)	Pilning
Filton Abbey Wood	Virgin CrossCountry; Cardiff - Newcastle (2006–2007)	Severn Tunnel Junction

== Future ==
The South Wales Main Line from London to Cardiff has now been electrified, as has the line to Bristol Temple Meads. However, the lines to Weston-super-Mare and Southampton will not be electrified in the near future, so services at Patchway will still be provided by diesel trains, with Sprinter units to be replaced by Class 165 and 166 Turbo units. The group Friends of Suburban Bristol Railways supports the electrification continuing to Weston, as does previous MP for Weston-super-Mare John Penrose.

== See also ==
- Rail services in Bristol
- MetroWest
