= New Passage =

Hamlet in South Gloucestershire, England

Coordinates: 51.5739°N 2.66°W

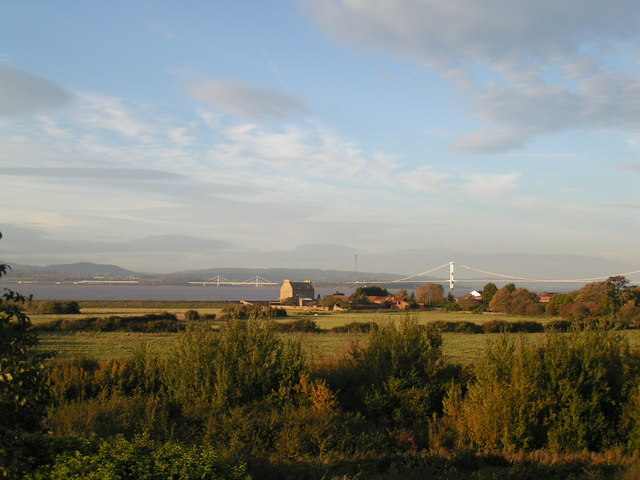
- Severn Lodge Farm and River Severn at New Passage

- Location within Gloucestershire
- OS grid reference: ST544863
- Civil parish: Pilning and Severn Beach
- Unitary authority: South Gloucestershire
- Ceremonial county: Gloucestershire
- Region: South West
- Country: England
- Sovereign state: United Kingdom
- Post town: BRISTOL
- Postcode district: BS35
- Dialling code: 01454
- Police: Avon and Somerset
- Fire: Avon
- Ambulance: South Western
- UK Parliament: Thornbury and Yate

New Passage is a hamlet in the civil parish of Pilning and Severn Beach, in the South Gloucestershire, district, in Gloucestershire, England, on the banks of the Severn estuary near the village of Pilning. The settlement takes its name from the ferry service, which operated from the 17th century until 1886, between England and South Wales. New Passage differentiated itself from the ancient ferry crossing known as Old Passage that operated further upstream.

== Ferry ==
=== History ===
New Passage was for many years the location of a ferry crossing to and from South Wales, running from Chestle Pill near Pilning to Black Rock at Portskewett in Monmouthshire. The route provided an alternative to the centuries-old Aust ferry two miles (3 km) upstream, known as the "Old Passage". The New Passage, which offered a more direct route to South Wales, was probably in operation from 1630, when the New Passage Ferry Company was formed.

The ferry was said to have been discontinued between 1645 and 1718. There is a tale, often repeated in 19th century and later guidebooks, that during the English Civil War King Charles was chased across the river from Portskewett: the pursuing Roundheads were drowned after being landed at low tide on the English Stones by the boatmen, after which Cromwell ordered the ferries to cease operation. This story originated in a deposition given by Giles Gilbert of Shirenewton during the course of a 1720s legal case regarding rights to operate the ferry, and which was later printed by William Coxe in his 1801 Historical Tour of Monmouthshire. While Gilbert claimed to be "credibly informed" that a group of Parliamentarian soldiers had perished while pursuing the King, another witness in the same legal case gave evidence that the incident had in fact involved a group of twelve Royalists who "in haste to pass" in November 1644 had forced the boatmen to take them across at low tide. The antiquary Octavius Morgan, on investigating these stories, found that the Iter Carolinum and the diary of Richard Symonds proved that Charles had intended to use the Black Rock crossing to reach Bristol on 24 July 1645, but had been dissuaded. Morgan however noted a contemporary report that Charles had a "narrow escape of being taken near the Black Rock" in July 1645 and suggested that some of Charles's party had crossed the Passage on the evening of 24 July "probably sent purposely to mislead the enemy [...] and the result was death by drowning of the pursuers".

In 1718 the New Passage ferry service was restarted by the Lewis family of St. Pierre, Monmouthshire, allowing it to be used by mail and passenger coaches between Bristol and south Wales. For much of the century the ferry rights, fishery and the inn at New Passage were rented from the Lewis family by John Hoggard. Amongst the travellers to use the ferry was Charles Wesley, who had a lucky escape in 1743, when his ship almost foundered in stormy weather. By the late 18th century the main mail coach route between Bristol and Milford Haven used the New Passage and by the end of the century the crossing rivalled the Old Passage route.

Bristol and South Wales Junction Railway and Aust Ferry Act 1847
- Act of Parliament
- Parliament of the United Kingdom
- Long title: An Act to enable the Bristol and South Wales Junction Railway Company to improve and maintain the Aust or Old Passage Ferry across the River Severn.
- Citation: 10 & 11 Vict. c. lxxxi

Dates
- Royal assent: 2 July 1847

Other legislation
- Repealed by: [Statute Law (Repeals) Act 2013]]

Status: Repealed

Text of statute as originally enacted

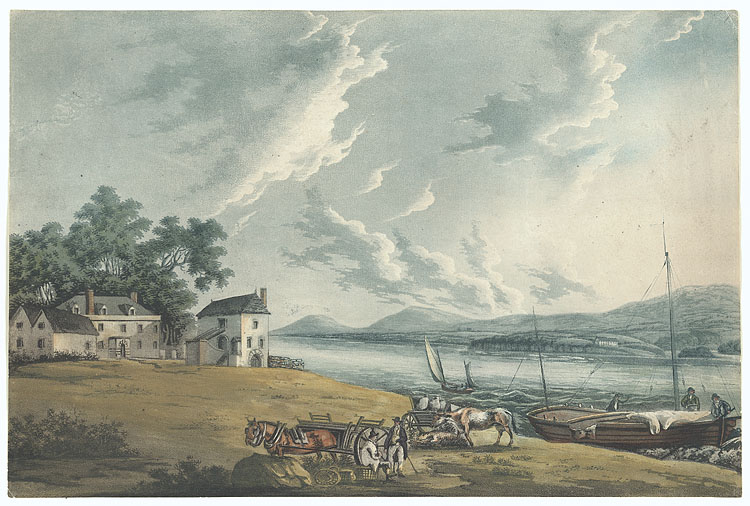
The ferry and inn at New Passage in 1810, with cattle being unloaded.

In 1825 the New Passage Association formed, using the 30-ton steamboat "St Pierre". However, the sponsorship by the Dukes of Beaufort of the Aust route, with faster boats and a pier, meant that by 1830 mail coaches were diverted there, and the New Passage declined. In the 1840s the ferry was purchased by the Bristol and South Wales Junction Railway Company for use as a crossing, having been authorised to do so by the Bristol and South Wales Junction Railway and Aust Ferry Act 1847 (10 & 11 Vict. c. lxxxi), although in the event the company failed to raise the capital to build a railway. A subsequent scheme, surveyed and engineered by Brunel and completed by his assistant Brereton, was opened in 1863 as the Bristol and South Wales Union Railway, using the New Passage ferry to cross the Severn to Portskewett. New Passage Pier railway station, a rebuilt New Passage Hotel, a promenade, tea rooms, and a 594-yard (543 m) railway pier, improved the facilities for travellers. One year earlier, an engineer engaged on building the pier had the idea of a tunnel under the river. In 1886, the Severn Tunnel opened and the New Passage ferry became redundant. The pier was dismantled within two years, though the beach, promenade and hotel remained popular with day trippers for many years afterwards.

The railway tunnel passes under the River Severn from a point just south of New Passage.

=== Characteristics ===
The engineer Thomas Telford, after surveying the crossing, described it in his report as "one of the most forbidding places at which an important ferry was ever established - a succession of violent cataracts formed in a rocky channel exposed to the rapid rush of a tide which has scarcely an equal". The river between New Passage and Black Rock was 11,200 feet wide at high water and 8,600 feet at low water, in comparison to figures of 6,800 and 4,700 feet for the Old Passage route. The crossing was complicated by the fact that, apart from six hours a day around high tide, two-thirds of the passage was through a channel between the English Stones and the Dun sandbank through which the ebb tide flowed so quickly that "a passage [could not] be made against it except in strong and favourable winds". Even after leaving this channel the ferries had to then cross the head of another channel, the Shoots, through which the current was so strong that they were often pulled down it by the ebb tide: all these difficulties meant that the passage was uncertain for around five hours a day. It was these irregularities in the service that led to the General Post Office eventually transferring mail back to the Old Passage: by 1834 it was found that mail coaches were arriving late at Swansea four times out of five, "almost wholly caused by delays at the New Passage". Nevertheless, the ferry was compared to the Aust crossing the most direct route into South Wales.

== Railway stations ==
New Passage has had two railway stations. Between 1863 and 1886 New Passage Pier railway station was open, primarily to serve passengers travelling to and from South Wales by the ferry. Between 1928 and 1964 the hamlet was served by New Passage Halt railway station on the Severn Beach line. It was situated at the eastern end of the hamlet.

== Second Severn Crossing ==
In 1996 the Second Severn Crossing road bridge, since 2018 formally known as the Prince of Wales Bridge, was completed, virtually along the same line as the Severn Tunnel. The bridge, the longest in the UK, carries M4 motorway traffic.

== New Passage Hotel ==
The hotel was opened in 1863 to serve railway passengers, replacing the earlier New Passage House inn. When the ferry closed it continued to prosper as a privately owned public house. In 1921 the hotel was the location of experiments by the inventor H.G. Matthews in the projection of moving films with a sound track.

The hotel was closed in 1973. It was then sold by the Bracey family, and the building was left empty, until ravaged by the elements and neglect, it was finally demolished in the late 1970s. A small luxurious housing development was created on the resulting land.

== Ecology ==
As of 2009, 31 species of seabird had been recorded in the Severn Beach / New Passage area, including Cory's shearwater, Sooty shearwater and Balearic shearwaters, white-bellied storm petrel (1st British record), 4 species of Diver including Pacific Diver, all four Northern Hemisphere skuas, seven species of tern and five species of alcid.
