= Pilning =

Village in Gloucestershire, England

Coordinates: 51.5640°N 2.6417°W

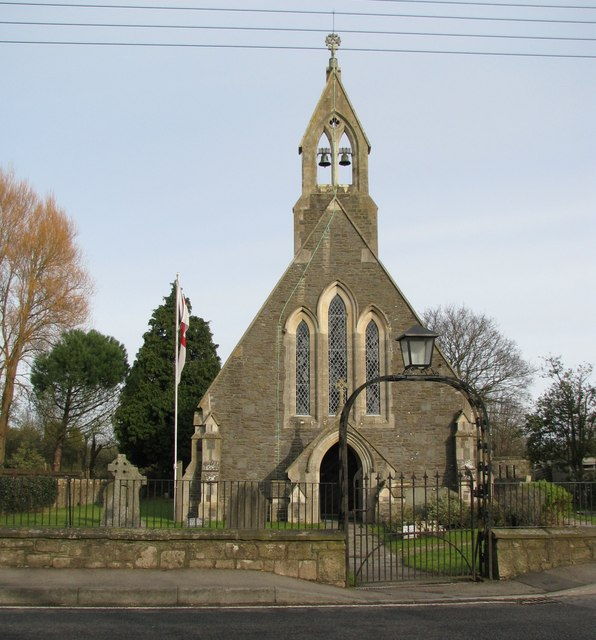

- Location within Gloucestershire
- Population: 3,647
- OS grid reference: ST556852
- Civil parish: Pilning and Severn Beach
- Unitary authority: South Gloucestershire
- Ceremonial county: Gloucestershire
- Region: South West
- Country: England
- Sovereign state: United Kingdom
- Post town: Bristol
- Postcode district: BS35
- Dialling code: 01454
- Police: Avon and Somerset
- Fire: Avon
- Ambulance: South Western
- UK Parliament: Thornbury and Yate

Pilning is a village in South Gloucestershire, England, close to Redwick and Severn Beach. Pilning is close to the M4, M49 and A403 roads, and has the South Wales Main Line railway running through it, with a minor station.

The civil parish is Pilning and Severn Beach. The population at the 2011 census was 3,647. An electoral ward exists in the same name.

Because of the close proximity of the River Severn and the English Stones section of the river bed, Pilning has found itself the ideal place to make both a substantial railway tunnel and motorway bridge. The Severn Tunnel opened in 1885 and the Second Severn Crossing opened in 1996.

== Landmarks ==
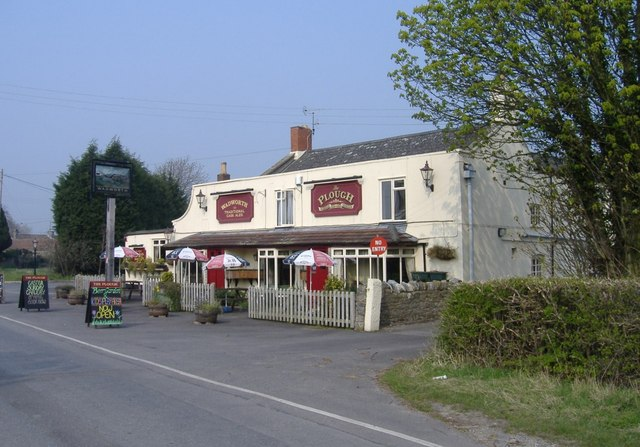
The Plough Inn

The village is home to St Peters Primary School and a number of other amenities including a shop, a doctor's surgery, and several pubs such as The King's Arms. The Plough Inn hosts a jazz evening on the first Sunday of every month. Pilning Cricket Club was established in 1883.

The parish church of St Peter was completed in 1855 (consecrated 9 August), the principal architect was Thomas Henry Wyatt with H. Crisp. It also has a late 20th-century south extension in same style. It is a grade II listed building. The village also contains the St Mary's Indian Orthodox Church.

Pilning had an annual Carnival, and an amateur dramatic society, "The Village Players". At Christmas 2015 the "Players" put on a pantomime production of "Mother Goose".

== Transport ==
Pilning railway station is located 1 mile (1.6 km) east of the village. As of 2023, only two eastbound trains a week serve the station due to the removal of the footbridge during Great Western Main Line electrification works.

Pilning is served hourly by bus route 12, operated by Stagecoach West, between Stoke Gifford (for Bristol Parkway) and Severn Beach.
