= New Passage Halt railway station =

Disused railway station in New Passage, South Gloucestershire

New Passage Halt

General information
- Location: New Passage, South Gloucestershire; England
- Coordinates: 51.569°N 2.6494°W
- Grid reference: ST550857
- Platforms: 1

Other information
- Status: Disused

History
- Original company: Great Western Railway
- Post-grouping: Great Western Railway

Key dates
- 9 July 1928: Opened
- 23 November 1964: Closed
Location

New Passage Halt railway station served the hamlet of New Passage, South Gloucestershire, England from 1928 to 1964 on the Severn Beach line.

== History ==
The station opened on 9 July 1928 by the Great Western Railway. It closed to both passengers and goods traffic on 23 November 1964.

Preceding station	Historical railways	Following station
Cross Hands Halt; Line and station closed	Great Western Railway; Severn Beach Line	Severn Beach; Line closed, station open
