= English Stones =

Rocky outcrop in the Severn Estuary, Britain

Coordinates: 51.56636°N 2.68669°W

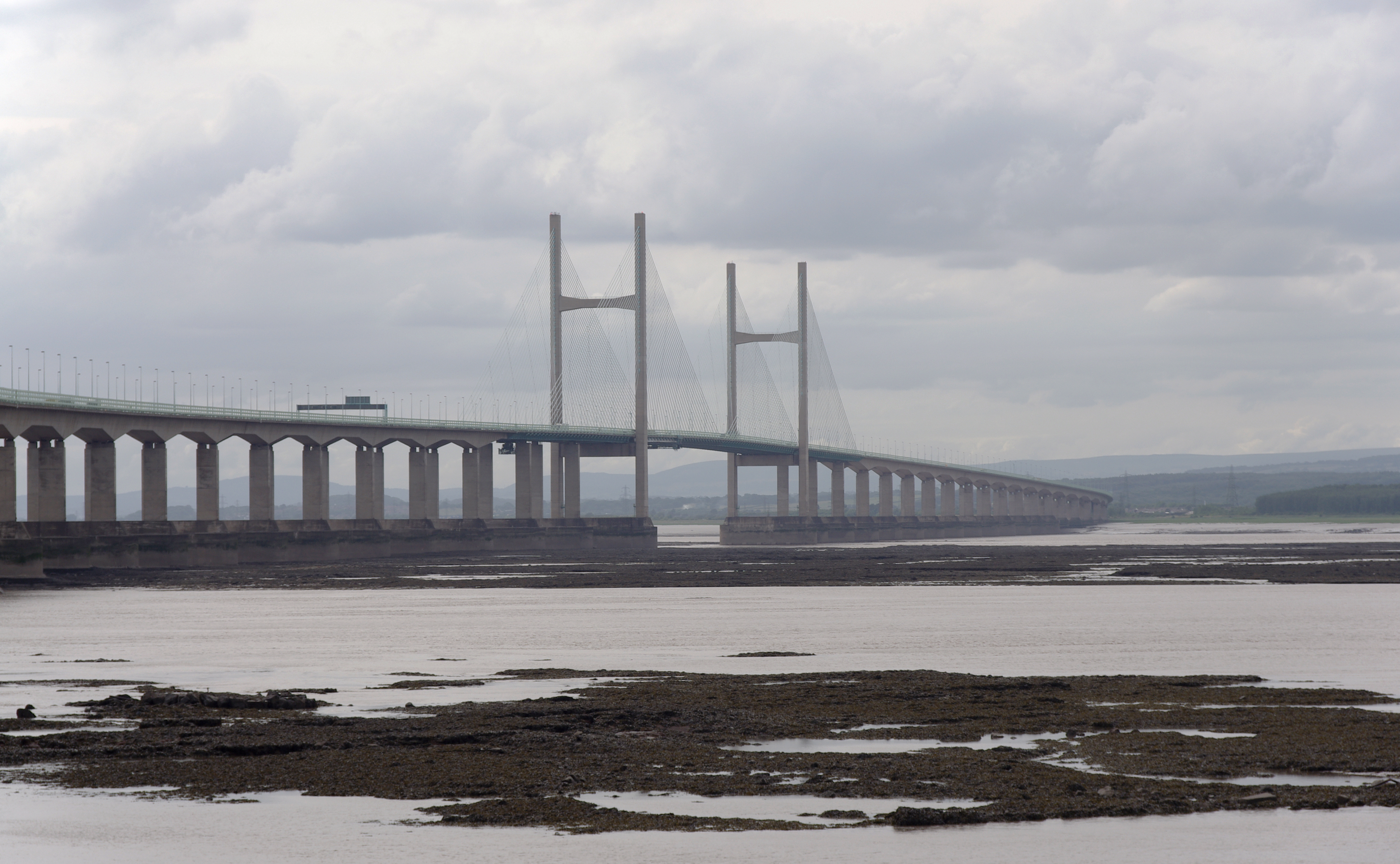
Parts of the Second Severn Crossing sit atop the English Stones

The English Stones are a rocky outcrop in the Severn Estuary between Caldicot, Monmouthshire, and Severn Beach, South Gloucestershire. Because the area is exposed at low tide, and is a rare spot of solid land in the highly tidal estuary, it has long been considered a good location to build barrages, dams or bridges. In the 1990s the construction of the Second Severn Crossing made use of the English Stones as a foundation for significant sections of the bridge.
