= New Passage Pier railway station =

Former railway station in England

New Passage Pier
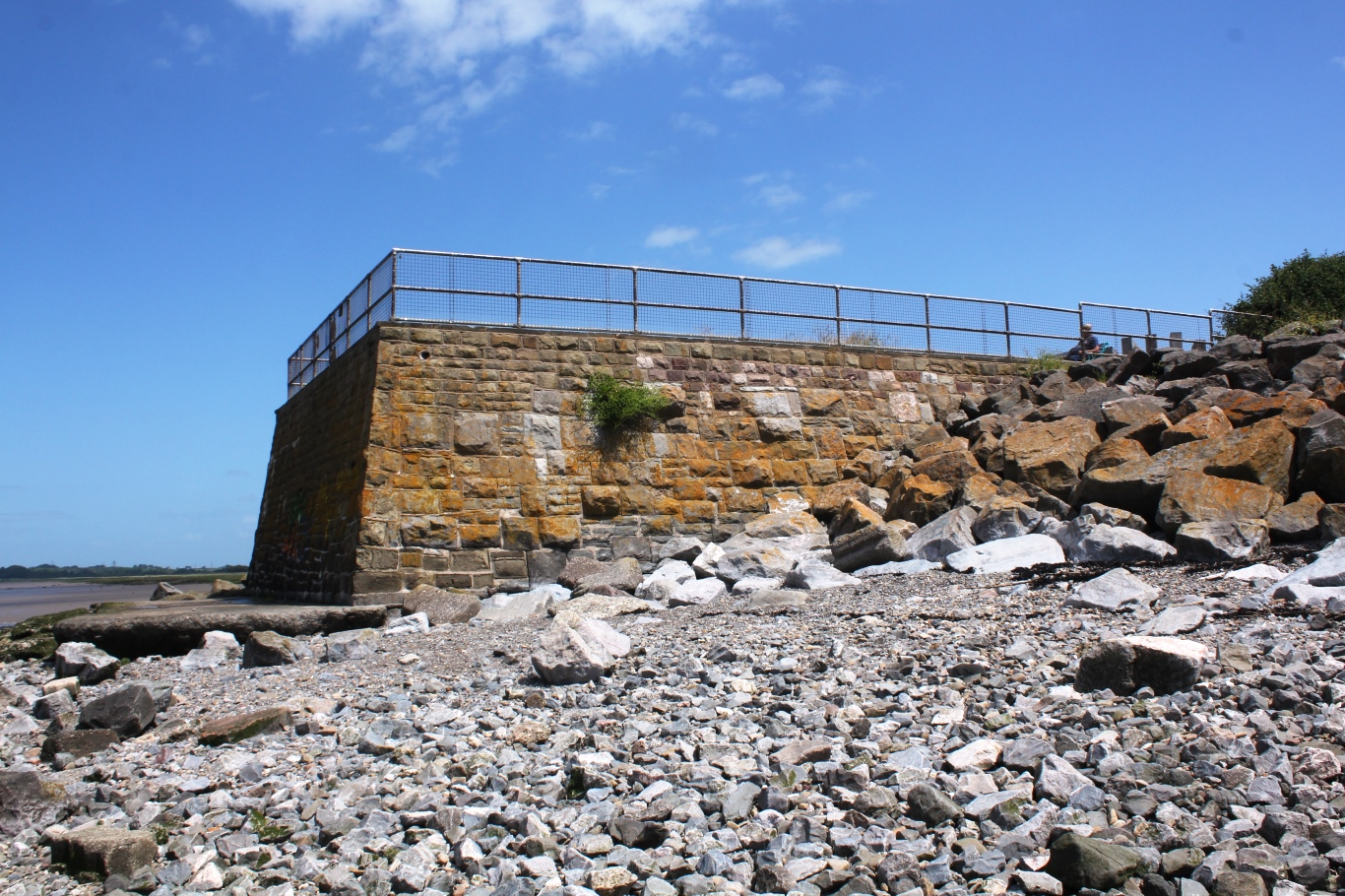
- The pier site in 2022

General information
- Location: New Passage, South Gloucestershire; England
- Coordinates: 51.5747°N 2.6606°W

Other information
- Status: Disused

History
- Original company: Bristol and South Wales Union Railway
- Pre-grouping: Great Western Railway

Key dates
- 1863: Opened
- 1886: Closed
Location

New Passage Pier was the original terminus of the Bristol and South Wales Union Railway, located on the south bank of the River Severn at New Passage, South Gloucestershire, England. At New Passage, passengers would disembark from trains and use a boat across the Severn.

New Passage had been the site of a ferry from England to Wales including the use by mail and passenger coaches between Bristol and Portskewett in south Wales. In 1825 the New Passage Association formed, using the 30-ton steamboat "St Pierre". However, the sponsorship by the Dukes of Beaufort of the Aust route, with faster boats and a pier, meant that by 1830 mail coaches were diverted there, and the New Passage declined.

Construction of the new railway started in 1858 and the single-track 7 ft (2,134 mm) broad gauge line opened from South Wales Junction, half a mile east of Bristol Temple Meads, as far as the landward end of New Passage Pier on 8 September 1863, a distance of 11 miles (18 km). The distance by rail between Bristol and Cardiff was reduced from 94 miles (151 km) to 38 miles (61 km). The Bristol and South Wales Union Railway built new piers for the ferry, with the one at New Passage being 546 yards (499 m) long.

A steam ferry, the Saint Pierre had been built by Pride and Williams for the New Passage crossing in 1825 and it worked there until 1831. The B&SWUR bought a new steamer, the Gem in 1863 but it proved unsuitable and was soon replaced by the Relief. John Bland, a carrier and shareholder in the railway, was contracted to operate the ferry. The next vessel purchased was the Dragon Fly, this had been used by the contractors to build the piers but was too small to work as the ferry. Instead, two paddle tugs, the Ajax and the Atlas were hired in to cover for the Relief.

A new paddle steamer arrived in June 1864, named Christopher Thomas after the chairman of the B&SWUR, it had been built for the company by Henderson, Coulborn and Company at Renfrew in Scotland. A slightly larger vessel named the Chepstow arrived from the same shipyard on 11 February 1875. These two continued in service until the Severn Tunnel was opened in 1886. They were sold to WS Ogden at Cardiff in 1880, the Chepstow being renamed the Rover. The funnels were generally painted black with a red band.

The station became redundant in 1886 following the construction of the Severn Tunnel, and was subsequently closed. The pier was demolished by 1888. A plaque now marks the site, and although the building of new piling for flood defences and new concrete castings means there is little to no trace of the railway on the land side, at low water, some remains of wooden piling can be seen below the plaque site.
