= Severn Tunnel =

Rail tunnel linking England and Wales

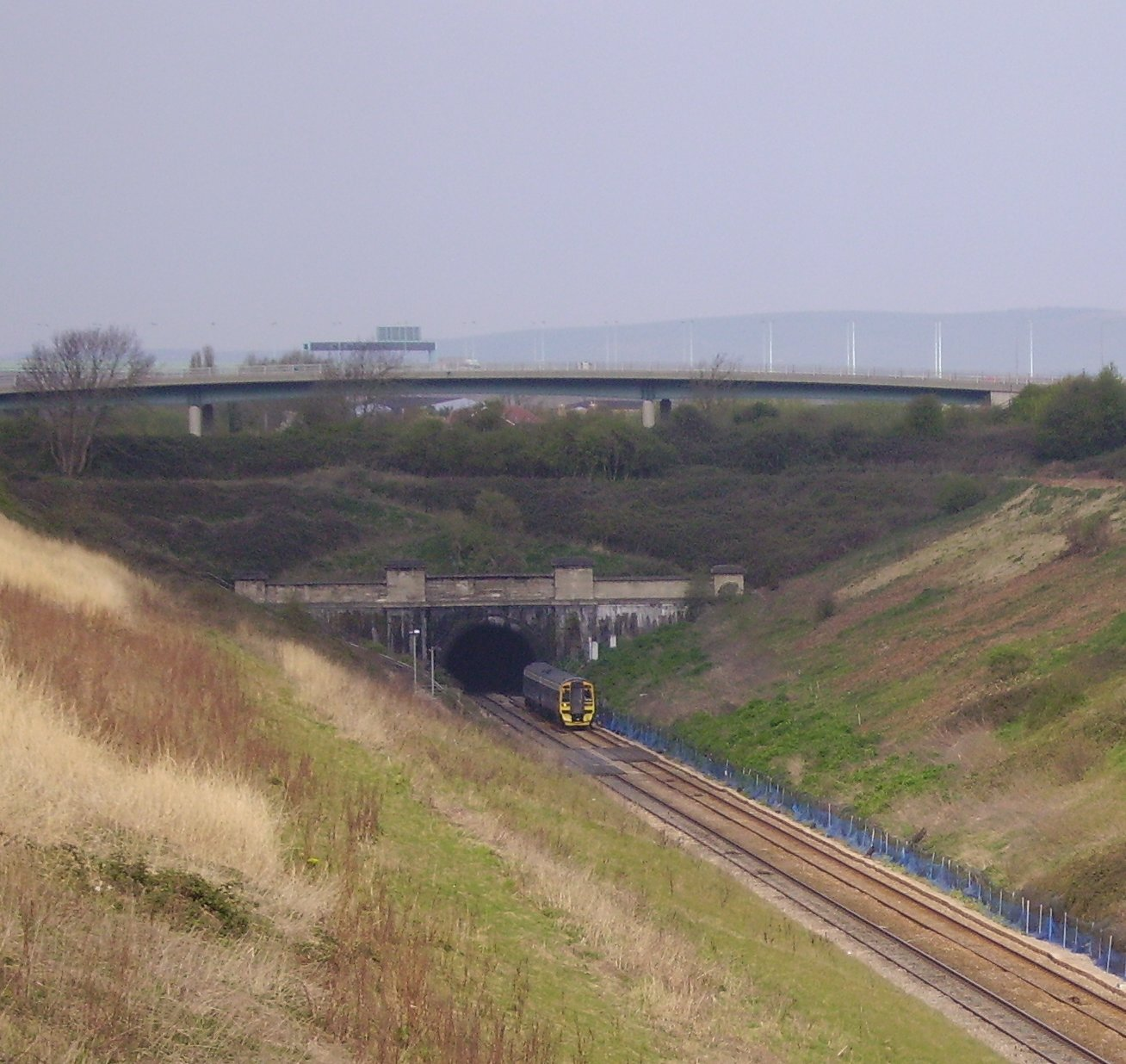
- The Tunnel entrance on the English side.
- Interactive map of Severn Tunnel

Overview
- Location: River Severn
- Coordinates: 51.575°N 2.6889°W
- Start: South Gloucestershire
- End: Monmouthshire

Operation
- Work began: 1873; 153 years ago
- Opened: 1886; 140 years ago
- Traffic: Railway

Technical
- Design engineer: Sir John Hawkshaw
- Length: 7,008 m (4.355 mi)

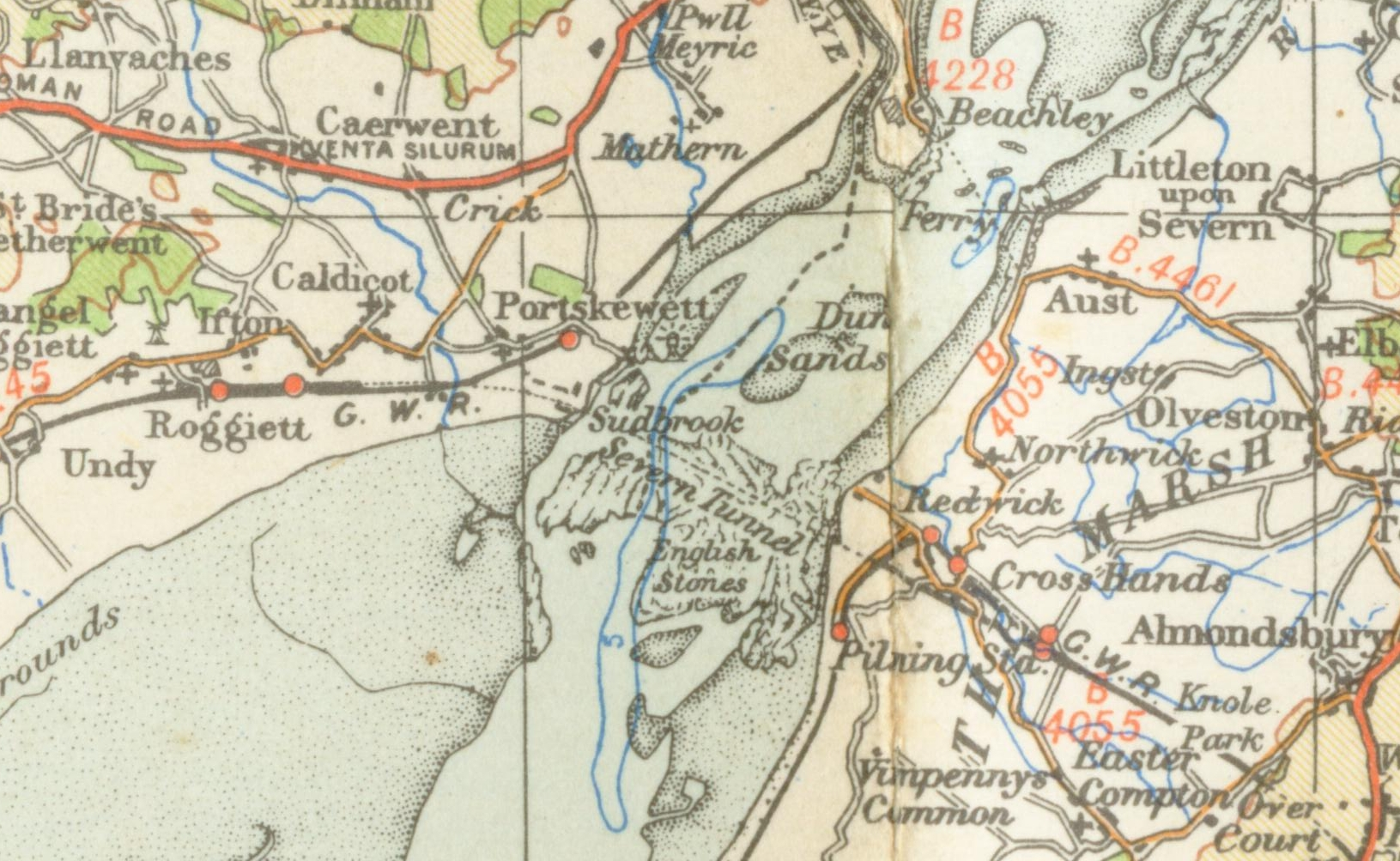
1946 map showing the route of the tunnel

The Severn Tunnel (Welsh: Twnnel Hafren) is a railway tunnel in the United Kingdom, linking South Gloucestershire in the west of England to Monmouthshire in south Wales under the estuary of the River Severn. It was constructed by the Great Western Railway (GWR) between 1873 and 1886 for the purpose of dramatically shortening the journey times of their trains, passenger and goods alike, between South Wales and Western England. It has often been regarded as the crowning achievement of GWR's chief engineer Sir John Hawkshaw.

Until the tunnel was built, lengthy detours were needed for all traffic between South Wales and Western England, either by ship or by a detour upriver via Gloucester. Recognising the value of such a tunnel, the GWR sought its development, tasking Hawkshaw with its design and later contracting the civil engineer Thomas A. Walker to undertake its construction, which commenced in March 1873. Work proceeded smoothly until October 1879, at which point significant flooding of the tunnel occurred from what is now known as "The Great Spring". Through strenuous and innovative efforts, the flooding was contained and work was able to continue, albeit with a great emphasis on drainage. Structurally completed during 1885, the first passenger train was run through the tunnel on 1 December 1886, nearly 14 years after the commencement of work.

Following its opening, the tunnel quickly formed a key element of the main trunk railway line between southern England and South Wales. Amongst other services, the GWR operated a car shuttle train service through the tunnel for many decades. However, the tunnel has also presented especially difficult conditions, both operationally and in terms of infrastructure and structural maintenance. On average, around 50 mega-litres of water per day infiltrates the tunnel, necessitating the permanent operation of several large pumping engines. Originally, during much of the steam era, a large number of pilot and banking locomotives were required to assist heavy trains traverse the challenging gradients of the tunnel, which were deployed from nearby marshalling yards.

The tunnel is 7,008 m (4.355 mi) long, of which 3,621 m (2.250 mi) is under the river. It was the longest underwater tunnel in the world until 1987—when Japan's Seikan Tunnel linking the islands of Honshu and Hokkaido took the title—and, for more than 100 years, it was the longest mainline railway tunnel within the UK. It was finally exceeded in this capacity during 2007 with the opening of the two major tunnels of High Speed 1, forming a part of the Channel Tunnel Rail Link. In 2016, overhead line equipment (OHLE) was installed in the tunnel to allow the passage of electric traction; this work was undertaken as one element of the wider 21st-century modernisation of the Great Western main line.

== General ==
Map showing the Severn Tunnel in relation to other crossings and the estuary itself

The Severn Tunnel forms a critical part of the trunk railway line between southern England and South Wales, and carries an intensive passenger train service as well as significant levels of goods traffic. As of 2012, an average of 200 trains per day use the tunnel. The whole length of the tunnel is controlled as a single signal section, which has the consequence of limiting the headway of successive trains.

There is a continuous drainage culvert between the tracks to lead ground water away to the lowest point of the tunnel, under Sudbrook Pumping Station, where it is pumped to the surface. The hazard of ignited petroleum running into the culvert in the event of derailment of a tank wagon means special arrangements have to be made to prevent occupation of the tunnel by passenger trains while hazardous liquid loads are being worked through. Evacuation arrangements are in place to enable the escape of passengers and staff in the event of serious accident in the tunnel.

There is restricted personnel access to the tunnel at Sudbrook Pumping Station, where an iron ladder descends in the shaft of the water pumping main; the ventilation air is pumped in at this point also. The GWR original ventilation arrangement was to extract air at Sudbrook, but the exhaust gases from steam train operation led to premature corrosion of the fan mechanism. When the Cornish pumping engines were replaced in the 1960s, the draughting was reversed so that atmospheric air is pumped into the tunnel exhausting at the tunnel mouths.

On average, it has been determined that around 50 million litres (11 million imp gal) per day of fresh (spring) water are typically being pumped from the tunnel; this is normally released directly into the adjacent River Severn. Attempts have also been made to try to determine the sources of the water which feeds the "Great Spring".

The especially difficult conditions for infrastructure maintenance in the tunnel, as well as the physical condition of the tunnel structure, require a higher than normal degree of maintenance attention. Access and personal safety difficulties mean that significant work tasks can only be performed during temporary line closure, during which trains are normally diverted via Gloucester. British NGO Engineering Timelines state that the tunnel would be full of water within 26 minutes if the pumps were switched off and backup measures failed, while Network Rail has also observed that the corrosive atmosphere of the tunnel, produced from a combination of moisture and diesel fumes from passing trains, results in so much corrosion that the steel rails need to be replaced every six years.

== History ==
=== Construction ===
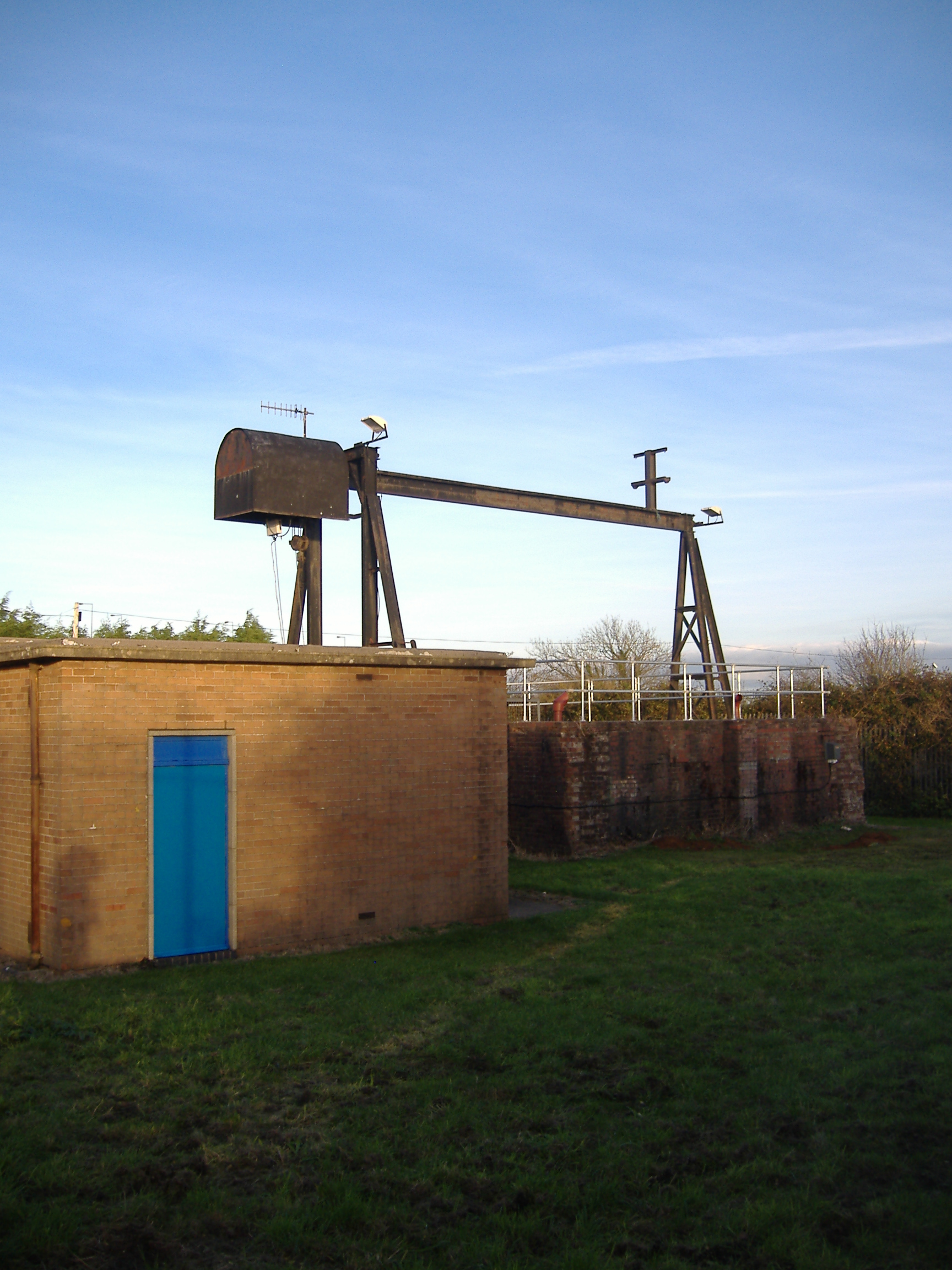
One of the pumping stations for the tunnel. This one is at Severn Beach.

Prior to the building of the tunnel, the railway journey between the Bristol area and South Wales involved a ferry journey between New Passage and Portskewett or a long detour via Gloucester. Officials of the Great Western Railway (GWR) soon realised that the rail journey time between the two locations could be greatly shortened by construction of a tunnel underneath the River Severn. Accordingly, during the early 1870s, GWR's chief engineer, Sir John Hawkshaw, developed his design for this tunnel. On 27 June 1872, the company obtained an act of Parliament, the Severn Tunnel Railway Act 1872 (35 & 36 Vict. c. liii) which authorised the construction of the envisioned railway tunnel as a replacement for the ferry between Portskewett, Monmouthshire and New Passage, Gloucestershire.

On 18 March 1873, construction activity commenced using labourers employed directly by the GWR; this initial work was focused on the sinking of a shaft, possessing a diameter of 15 feet (4.6 m) at Sudbrook and a smaller drainage heading near the Pennant Measures. The rate of early work on the tunnel was slow and gradual, but without major incident. By August 1877, only the shaft and a 0.93 miles (1.5 km) heading had been completed; accordingly, that same year, new contracts were issued for the digging of additional shafts at both sides of the Severn as well as new headings along the tunnel's intended route.

As the civil engineer Thomas A. Walker, who was appointed as the contractor for the tunnel's construction, notes in his book, the GWR had expected the critical part of the work to be the tunnelling under the deep-water channel of the Shoots. However, the most substantial difficulties of the venture were encountered during October 1879, when, with only 130 yards (119 m) separating the main tunnel heading being driven from the Monmouthshire side and the shorter Gloucestershire heading, the workings were inundated. The incoming water was fresh, not from the Severn but from the Welsh side, and the source became known as "The Great Spring".

Walker was entrusted by Hawkshaw to proceed with efforts to rescue and then complete the tunnel following the 1879 flooding. To achieve this required holding the Great Spring in check, which in turn was accomplished via the installation of greatly-increased pumping facilities, while a diver also had to be sent down a shaft and 330 yards (300 m) along the tunnel heading to close a watertight door in the workings, sealing off the waters. During November 1880, this troublesome task was finally achieved by the lead diver, Alexander Lambert, who was equipped with Henry Fleuss' newly developed self-contained rebreather apparatus, avoiding the need for the trailing hose of standard diving dress. However, work in the area of the Great Spring was unable to continue until January 1881, at which point the Great Spring was temporarily sealed off.

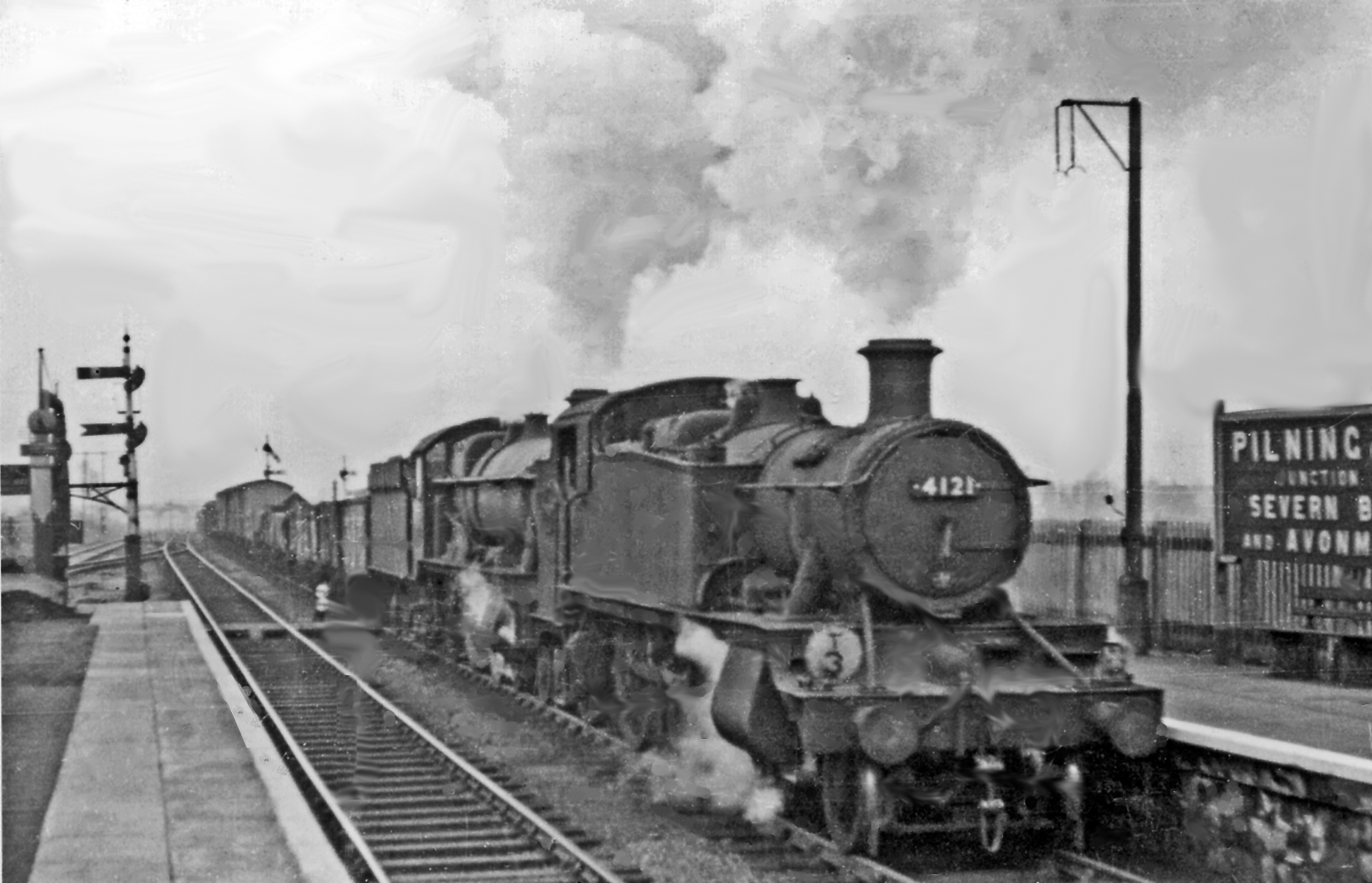
GWR 5101 Class No.4121 piloting No.4998 Eyton Hall on a mixed freight train through Pilning, having climbed the bank up from the Severn Tunnel, 1961

On 26 September 1881, the two headings met, marking a key milestone in the tunnel's construction, efforts transferred to addressing the tunnel's final structure along with the long deep cuttings at either end. During October 1883, work was again disrupted by further flooding originating from the Great Spring, which was further compounded by the appearance of a spring tide only a week later; again, Lambert and other divers managed to save the day and seal the works. It was recognised that water ingress problems were to continue, thus a heading was driven at a gradient of 1 in 500 from the original Sudbrook shaft, continuing until it reached the fissure through which the Great Spring flowed. By diverting the water into the new heading, the walled-in section of the tunnel could be more easily drained and finished.

There were additional mishaps which afflicted the construction site; at one point, there was an unintentional breakthrough of the bed of a pool, known as the "Salmon Pool", on the English side of the tunnel. It had been originally assumed that the continuous brickwork lining of the tunnel would withstand the groundwater pressure, thus the drainage sluice valve on the side heading was closed and all but one of the pumps were taken from the site. However, on 20 December 1885, the pressure rose so high (up to 395 kN per sq m) that a number of bricks were discovered to have been pushed out of the lining. To address this, the sluice valve was opened gradually, allowing the pressure to subside but necessitating the long-term operation of additional pumping engines. In the intervening period, the Severn Railway Bridge, a competing means for railway traffic to traverse the Severn, spanning between Sharpness and Lydney, was also being built, eventually being opened to traffic during 1879.

On 22 October 1884, work commenced on the laying of the double tracks throughout the tunnel. On 18 April 1885, the final brick was placed in the tunnel's lining. It possessed a horseshoe-shaped cross-section, complete with a concave floor, having a height of 20 feet (6.1 m) above the rails along with a maximum width of 26 feet (7.9 m). An enclosed drainage channel, in the form of an upturned semi-circular tunnel, is built onto the tunnel invert, 4.6 feet (1.4 m) below the rails and having a height of 21.0 inches (533 mm). According to Railway Industry publication Rail Engineer, it is believed that around 76.4 million bricks were used in the tunnel's construction. The brickwork is between 27.0 inches (686 mm) and 36.0 inches (914 mm) thick. Around the deepest part of the tunnel, the roof is only a maximum of 50 feet (15.2 m) beneath the river bed.

During mid-1885, the Severn Tunnel was completed from a structural standing. To mark this accomplishment, on 5 September 1885, a special passenger train carrying numerous company officials and VIPs, including Sir Daniel Gooch, the then-chairman of the GWR, travelled through the tunnel. The first goods train passed through it on 9 January 1886. However, regular services would have to wait until the permanent pumping systems were complete. On 17 November 1886, the tunnel works were inspected by Colonel F. H. Rich, the government inspector, a necessary step in advance of its opening to any passenger traffic. Colonel Rich approved the works; thus, the tunnel was opened to regular goods trains during September 1886; the first passenger train followed on 1 December 1886, by which point nearly 14 years had passed since work on the tunnel had started.

=== Operations ===
At the newly built Severn Tunnel Junction station, the GWR built a major marshalling yard, which: distributed east and north, sending coal from the South Wales Valleys towards London and the Midlands; created mainline and localised mixed-traffic freight from goods shipped in from the Midlands, the Southwest and along the Thames Valley, both westwards into Wales and vice versa.

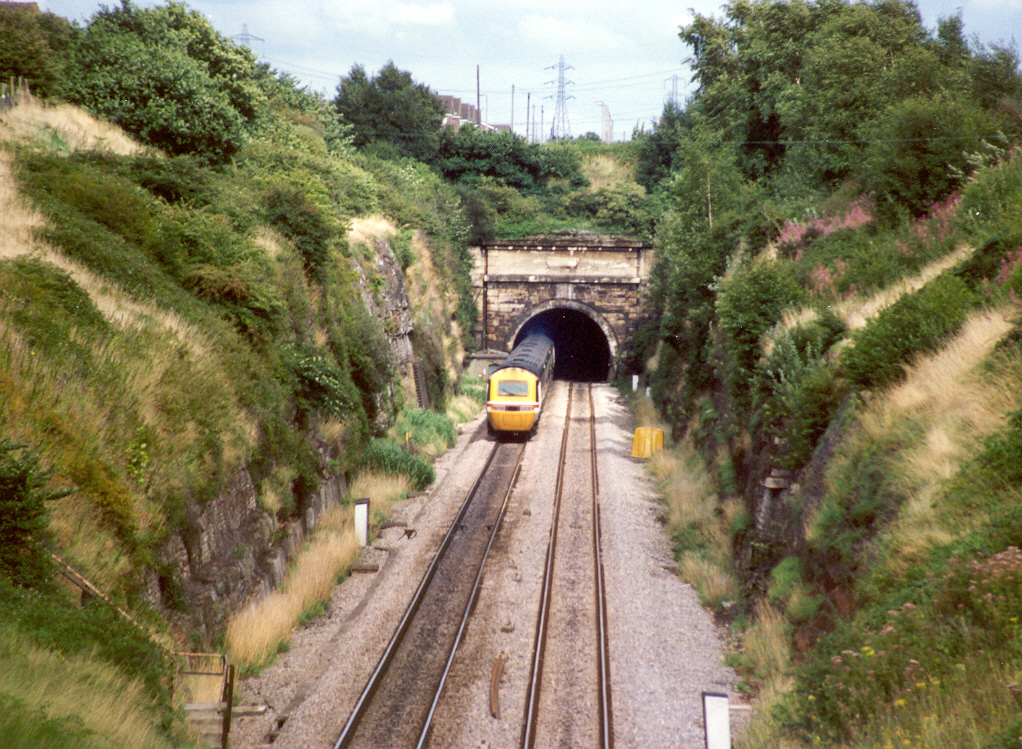
A High Speed Train enters the Severn Tunnel in 1997 from the Welsh side under Caldicot.

Due to the access gradients, throughout the steam era, assistance was required for the passage of all heavy trains through the Severn Tunnel, which entailed (eastwards, from Severn Tunnel Junction): 3 1/2 miles (5.6 km) of 1-in-90 down to the middle of the tunnel; a further 3 1/2 miles (5.6 km) at 1-in-100 up to Pilning; a short level then 3 1/2 miles (5.6 km) more at 1-in-100 to Patchway. This meant that the associated locomotive shed at Severn Tunnel Junction (86E), had a large number of pilot and banking locomotives to assist heavy trains through the tunnel. Under typical operations, pilot locomotives usually worked eastwards and were detached at Pilning, and would then work westwards piloting a second train back to the marshalling yard. During the latter days of steam under British Rail, these locomotives were mainly a group of latter-built GWR 5101 Class 2-6-2T locomotives, the bulk of which now form the core preserved stock of that class today.

A number of fixed Cornish engines, powered by Lancashire boilers, were used to permanently pump out the Great Spring and other sources of water from the tunnel. These were still in regular use until the 1960s, at which point they were replaced by electrically powered pumps. These pumps and their control systems have since been replaced during the 1990s by privately owned railway infrastructure company Railtrack. During the 1930s, the availability of the reliable fresh water supply from the Great Spring was a significant contributing factor in favour of the selection of an adjacent site to be established as the Royal Navy Propellant Factory, Caerwent. Water was also supplied for paper manufacture to a mill at Sudbrook; this facility has since been closed.

On 7 December 1991, the Severn Tunnel rail accident occurred, involving an InterCity 125 that was struck from behind by a Class 155. The subsequent accident investigation, while unable to reach a firm conclusion on the cause, suggested that the axle counters used for detecting train movements in the tunnel had been accidentally reset.

The Second Severn Crossing, which was built during the 1990s, crosses over the tunnel via a "ground level bridge" on the English side, near the Salmon Pool. This bridge is supported in such a way that no load is imposed on the tunnel. During that bridge's construction, the opportunity was taken to renew the concrete cap above the tunnel in the Salmon Pool.

In 2002, two Class 121s were overhauled by LNWR, Crewe for use as a Network Rail emergency train that was stabled near Severn Tunnel Junction station. They were removed in 2008 having never been used.

==== Car transport ====
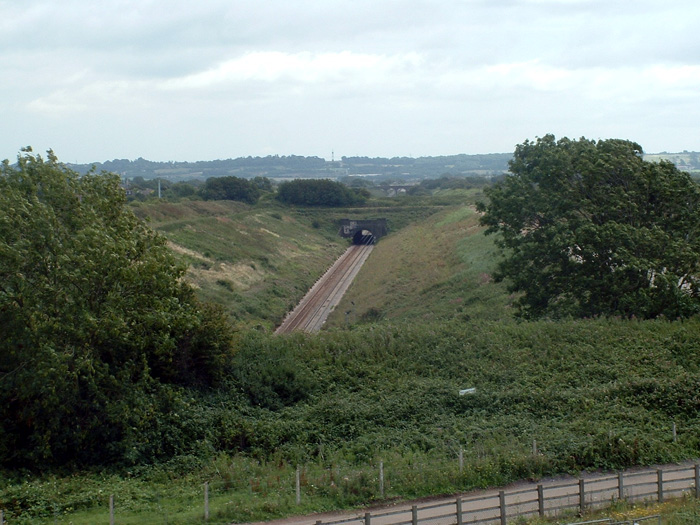
The approach to the tunnel from the English side.

Before 1909 a few vehicles were transported through the tunnel on an informal basis. On 7 April 1909 the Great Western Railway started a formal service for the conveyance of motor cars through the tunnel. The vehicles were drained of petrol before being loaded, and refuelled at the destination. In the first year more than 300 cars were carried. The service was suspended for a time during the First World War but restarted in 1921. The charge in 1921 was £1 8s (equivalent to £59 in 2025) on an open truck, or £2 8s (equivalent to £102 in 2025) in a closed truck.

The car shuttle train service would transport cars on rail trucks through the tunnel between Pilning and Severn Tunnel Junction. The service functioned as a rail-based alternative to the Aust Ferry, which was operated under an erratic timetable determined by the tides, or lengthy road journeys via Gloucester.

The rail shuttle service was continued after the end of World War II, but was ultimately made redundant by the opening of the Severn Bridge in 1966, leading to its discontinuation shortly thereafter.

== Electrification ==
As part of the 21st-century modernisation of the Great Western Main Line, the tunnel was prepared for electrification. While the structure provided good clearances and was therefore relatively easy to electrify, there was also a detracting factor in the form of the continuous seepage of water through the tunnel roof in some areas, which provided a key engineering challenge. The options of using either conventional tunnel electrification equipment or a covered solid beam technology were considered; supported by studies, it was decided to use the solid beam approach. Accordingly, along the length of the tunnel's roof, an aluminium conductor rail was installed to hold an un-tensioned copper contact cable; this rail is held in place using roughly 7000 high-grade stainless steel fixtures, which should be resistant to the hostile tunnel environment. Reportedly, the rigid rail is more robust, requires less maintenance, and is more compact than traditional overhead wires, and has been used in several other tunnels along the GWML.

In order to install the overhead electrification equipment, a six-week closure of the Severn Tunnel was necessary, which commenced on 12 September 2016. During that time, alternative means of travel were either a longer train journey via Gloucester, or a bus service between Severn Tunnel Junction and Bristol Parkway stations. Also during that time, and until late 2017, there were direct flights between Cardiff and London City Airport. Following the completion of this work, which involved the installation of 8.7 miles (14 km) of copper contact wires using 1,700 vertical drop tubes and 857 anchoring points at a rough cost of £10 million to perform, the tunnel was reopened to regular traffic on 22 October 2016. However, less than two years later, another three-week closure of the tunnel was enacted after it was discovered that some of the recently installed overhead electrification equipment had already started to rust. To combat corrosion, aluminium wire was used, the first of its type in the United Kingdom. Electric trains began operating through the tunnel in June 2020.

Further works to improve reliability of the electrification took place in May 2026, where a £23m programme from Network Rail delivered an innovative new overhead line system specifically designed for the tunnel's harsh, corrosive environment. The work included replacing 838 overhead line support arms, installing 14,000 metres of new wiring, 7,000 metres of single copper contact wire supported by modified bridge arms (which are more resistant to corrosion) and removing and replacing 7,200 metres of ageing equipment throughout the tunnel.

== See also ==
- Severn tunnel (1810)
- Crossings of the River Severn
