= Prince of Wales Bridge =

M4 motorway bridge over the Severn Estuary in the United Kingdom

Prince of Wales Bridge Pont Tywysog Cymru (Welsh)
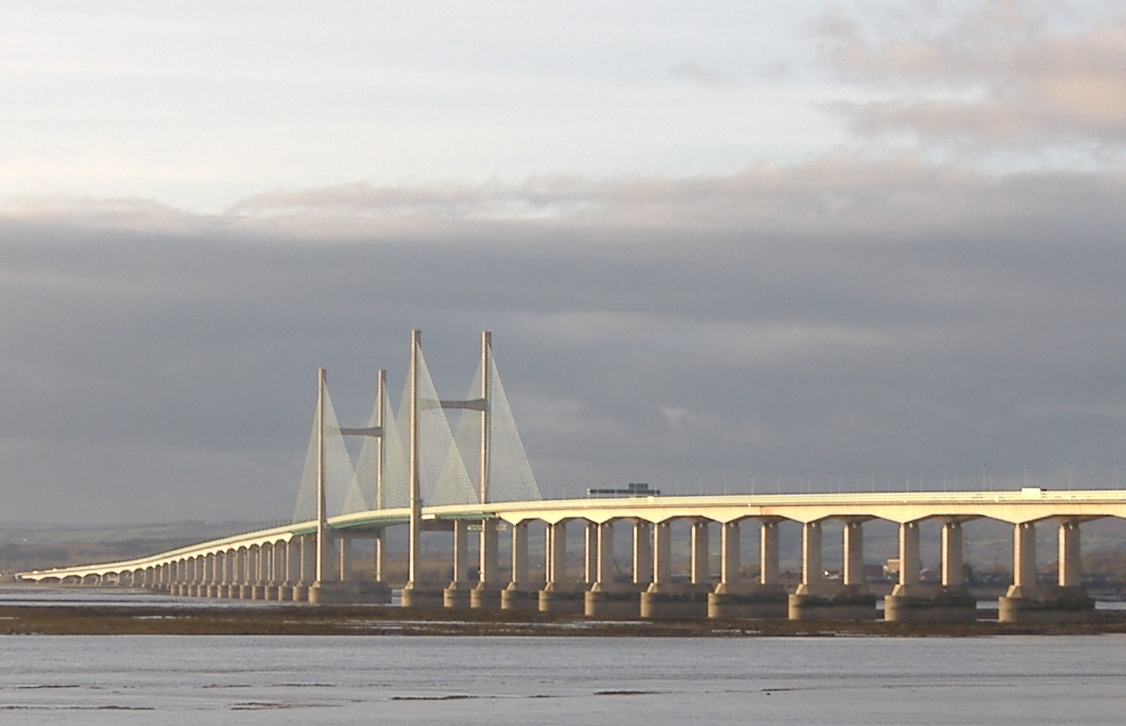
- The bridge as viewed from Severn Beach (England)
- Coordinates: 51°34′28″N 2°42′06″W
- Carries: M4 motorway (6 lanes)
- Crosses: River Severn
- Locale: South West England / South East Wales
- Official name: Prince of Wales Bridge (since 2 July 2018)
- Other name(s): Second Severn Crossing; Ail Groesfan Hafren (Welsh)
- Named for: Charles, Prince of Wales or River Severn
- Maintained by: National Highways

Characteristics
- Design: Central span: Cable-stayed bridge Approach viaducts: Segmental bridge
- Total length: 5,128 metres (16,824 ft)
- Width: 34.6 metres (113.5 ft)
- Height: 137 metres (449 ft)
- Longest span: 456 metres (1,496 ft)
- Clearance below: 37 metres (121 ft)

History
- Architect: Ronald Weeks of the Percy Thomas Partnership
- Engineering design by: Halcrow Group and SEEE
- Opened: 5 June 1996; 30 years ago

Statistics
- Daily traffic: 61,455 (2008)
- Toll: Free

Location
- Interactive map of Prince of Wales Bridge

Map showing the Second Severn Crossing in relation to other crossings and the estuary itself

The Prince of Wales Bridge (Welsh: Pont Tywysog Cymru), previously the Second Severn Crossing (Welsh: Ail Groesfan Hafren) until July 2018, is the M4 motorway bridge over the River Severn between England and Wales, opened in 1996 to supplement the traffic capacity of the Severn Bridge built in 1966. The bridge is operated by England's National Highways. It has a total length of 5,128 metres (16,824 ft), or 3.2 miles.

It is southwest of the Severn Bridge and because it is more closely in line with the rest of the M4, it reduces the length of the journey between England and Wales. The junctions at each end are designed for most traffic to use this crossing, and in order to use the old Severn Bridge, one has to leave the M4 at junction 21 and join the M48 near Aust or at junction 23 near Magor. The new crossing carries more traffic than the Severn Bridge, which is still in use. It is wider than the Severn Bridge, having three lanes and a narrow hard shoulder each way, compared to the two lanes, cycle path and narrow footpath of the original crossing. It is a cable-stayed bridge, whereas the Severn Bridge is a suspension bridge. The position of the bridge is close to that of the Severn Tunnel, which has carried the railway line beneath the river bed since 1886.

Much of the estuary is mudflats at low tide, but at high tide these can be covered by as much as 14 metres (46 ft) of water. This presented the engineers with a constraint: packets of work were scheduled at low tide, and needed to be completed within the short windows allowed by the tides.

The concession given to the consortium which financed, built and operate the bridge required them to take over the outstanding debt on the original Severn Bridge and to operate the two bridges as a single entity. Tolls were set annually by the government based on the previous year's change in the Retail Price Index. On the expiry of the concession in January 2018, the consortium was required to hand the bridge over to public ownership. The tolls on both bridges were subsequently scrapped in December 2018.

== Background ==
The Severn Estuary presented a barrier between the Bristol area and South Wales. The estuary has a maximum tidal range of 14.5 metres (48 ft), amongst the highest in the world, and during a rising or falling tide there are strong currents of up to 8 knots (4.1 m/s). Much of the estuary is mud flats that are exposed at low tide; these have been designated a Special Protection Area. The central part of the estuary is a navigable channel which, at the site of the bridge, is known as "The Shoots". The bridge is upstream from Avonmouth and the Port of Bristol, but downstream from the Port of Sharpness. The Gloucester Harbour Trustees have responsibility for controlling navigation in the estuary's tidal waters upstream from the bridge.

Until 1966, road travellers could either use the Aust Ferry, which had operated since medieval times (and as a car ferry since 1926), or use the scheduled car shuttle train service through the Severn Tunnel between Pilning and Severn Tunnel Junction, which operated from 1926 until 1966. Otherwise, the detour via Gloucester would add 57 miles (92 km) to the journey. In 1966, the first Severn road bridge, a four-lane suspension bridge, was opened, carrying the M4 motorway between England and South Wales. By 1984, traffic across the first Severn Bridge had tripled and it was projected that by the mid-1990s, the old bridge would be running at capacity. A study was commissioned into building either a second bridge or a tunnel. The consultants reported back in 1986, recommending that a new bridge be built downstream from the existing bridge.

In 1988, it was announced that tenders would be invited from private consortia to fund, build and operate the bridge for a specified period. The consortium would also take over the management of the old bridge and the associated £100 million debt. Tenders were invited in 1989; and in 1990 the concession to build the bridge was awarded to Severn River Crossing plc. Construction work started on 26 April 1992 and the bridge was opened by Charles III (when Prince of Wales) on 5 June 1996. In 2018, the bridge was renamed as Prince of Wales Bridge by the UK Government to recognise the 60th anniversary of Charles being given the title of Prince of Wales. He subsequently unveiled a renaming plaque at an event held at Celtic Manor Resort in Newport. The renaming was criticised by Plaid Cymru and an online petition of 38,000 signatories called for the process to be halted.

== Design ==
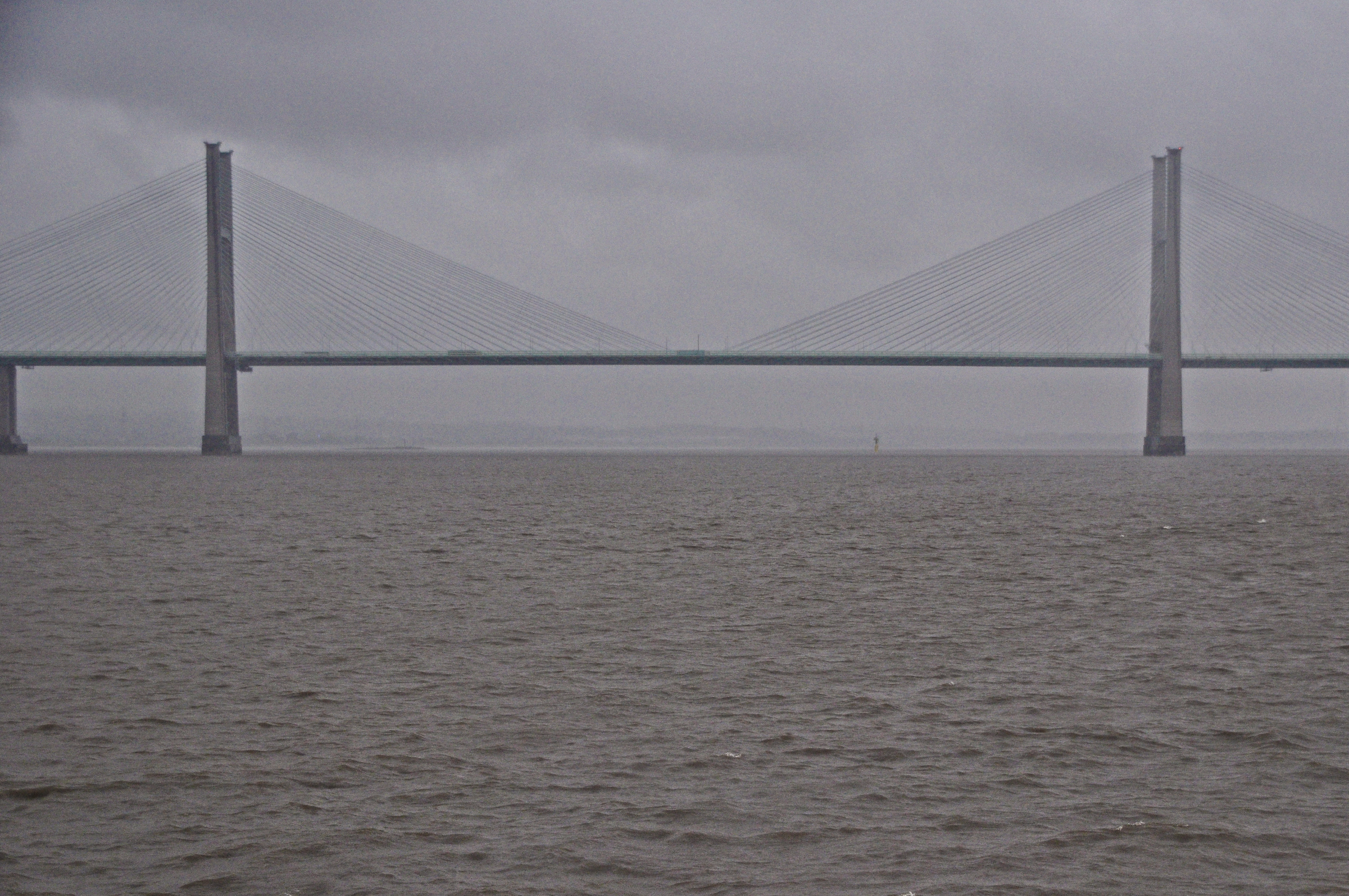
The Shoots Bridge; the shipping channel lies between the two towers

The chief architect of the bridge was Ronald Weeks of the Cardiff-based Percy Thomas Partnership, with the detailed engineering design by the Halcrow Group and the French consultancy SEEE. The bridge has portals close to Sudbrook, Monmouthshire on the Welsh side and Severn Beach in South Gloucestershire on the English side. It has three principal sections – a 25 span viaduct on the English side of length 2,103 m (6,900 ft; 1.307 mi), a 24 span viaduct of length 2,077 m (6,814 ft; 1.291 mi) on the Welsh side and the bridge itself, a 948 m (3,110 ft; 0.589 mi) structure with a 37 m (121 ft) navigational clearance, giving a total length of 5,128 m (16,824 ft; 3.186 mi). The central section, called the Shoots Bridge, is of cable-stayed design and the central span (between the bridge pylons) is 456 metres (1,496 ft) in length. The approach viaducts are of a segmental bridge design. The crossing forms a very slight reverse "S" curve – the roadway has an approximate east–west alignment at each of the portals, while the central bridge follows an alignment approximately WNW to ESE.

The Severn Railway Tunnel passes under the estuary bed on a line which is generally about 500 metres (1,600 ft) upstream of the bridge, but which passes under the line of the bridge close to the English shore.

The deck, which carries three lanes of traffic in each direction, is 34.6 metres (114 ft) wide. The sides of the bridge are fitted with 3-metre (10 ft) baffle plates to reduce lateral wind loads coming from the Severn Estuary onto the traffic; this has reduced the number of times that speed restrictions have been needed. The overall design of the new crossing makes it more resistant to high winds than the old Severn Bridge.

The Rapid Access Train parked in the station on the English side of the bridge.

A small diesel-powered suspension railway monorail, the Rapid Access Train, runs underneath the full length of the crossing at a top speed of 1.5 metres per second (3.4 mph; 5.4 km/h), and is used for safe access to ten stations, such as lifts inside the cable pylons, for bridge maintenance. It can carry up to four passengers plus two tonnes of equipment in its trailer, with an integral crane and safety features such as interlocks, emergency battery propulsion capable of returning to either end of the crossing, and a dead man's switch. During the 1990s and early 2000s, the Rapid Access Train was initially disused for a number of years due to rail faults, but has been returned to service. Travelling access gantries are also present underneath each segment of the crossing to allow for inspection and maintenance across the full width of the structure, with hydraulic lift platforms capable of reaching multiple levels.

== Construction ==
Construction of the Second Severn Crossing
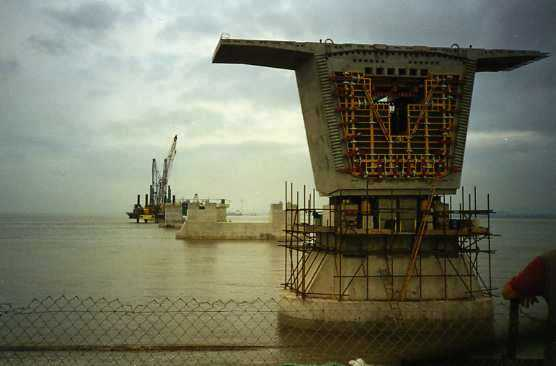
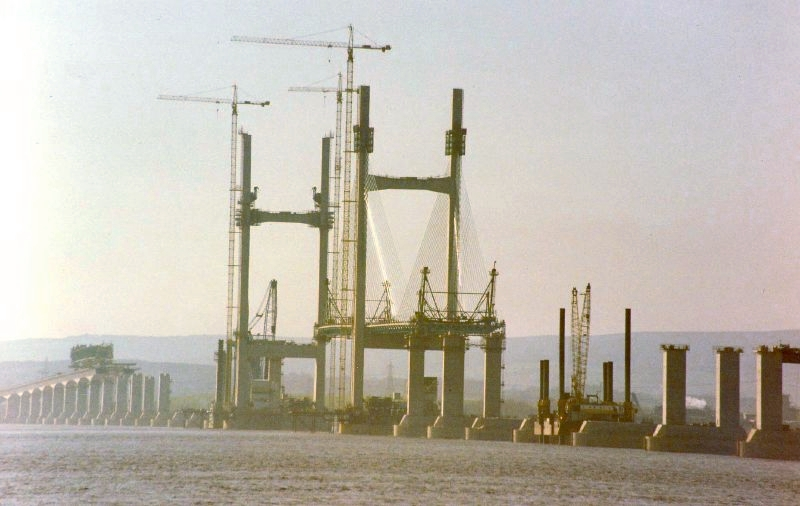

The crossing was built by a business consortium under a public-private partnership. A company called Severn River Crossing plc, led by John Laing plc and GTM-Entrepose, was formed to build the new crossing. This company also took over the responsibility of managing and maintaining the old Severn Bridge crossing, as well as managing and maintaining the new crossing. The cost of constructing the new crossing was to be paid for by tolls collected from motorists using the two crossings. Work on the new crossing began in 1992. Completion was in 1996.

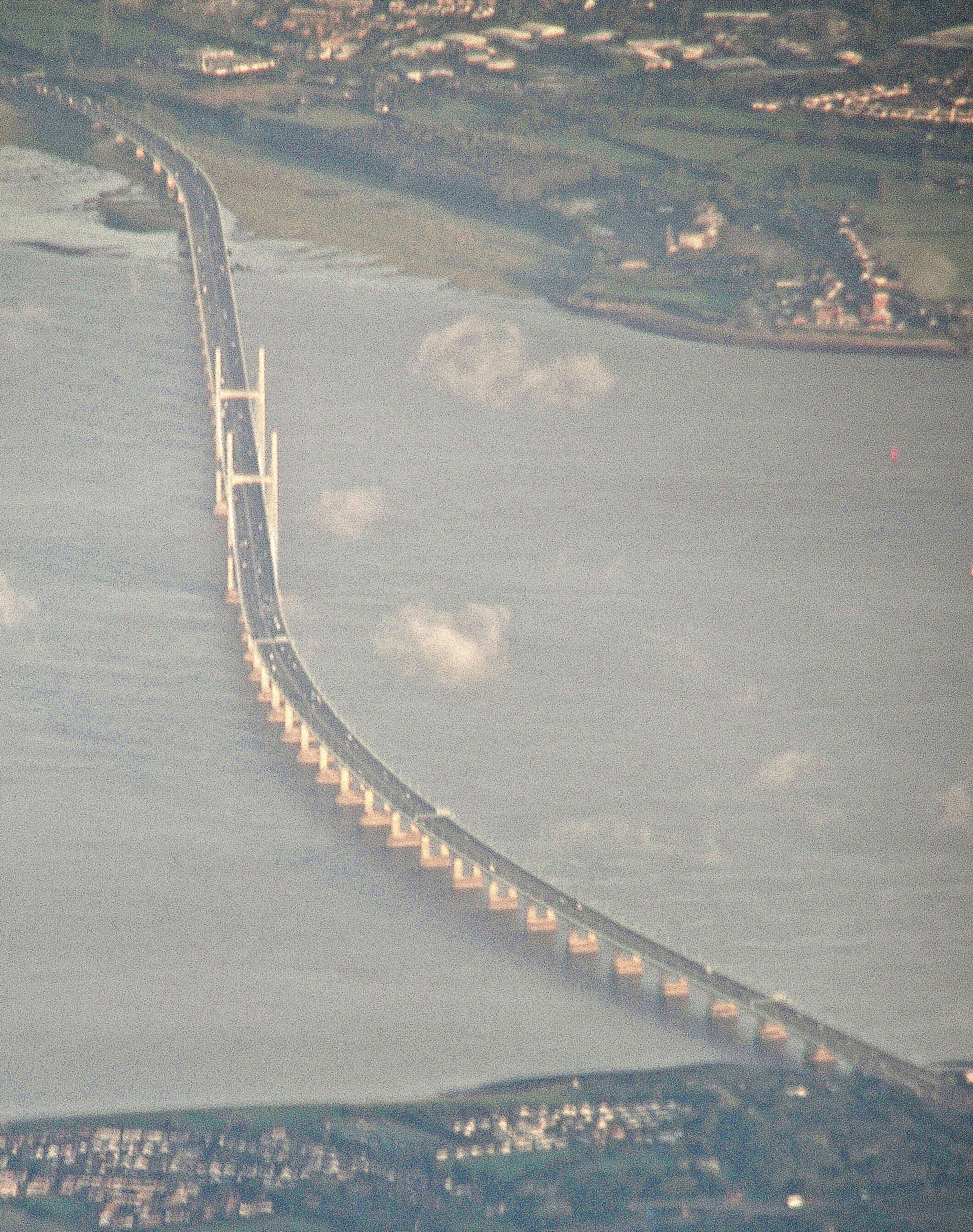
Aerial view of the crossing

Sub-assemblies for the bridge were constructed onshore and then shifted by a large tracked vehicle (similar to that used to move the Apollo and Space Shuttle at Cape Kennedy) onto a barge (the SAR3), prior to being floated out on the high tide to the site. The 37 bridge pier foundations on the approach viaducts are 98.11 metres (321.9 ft) apart, and consist of open concrete caissons weighing up to 2,000 tonnes, which were founded on the rock of the estuary bed. The decking consists of 3.6-metre (11.8 ft) post-stressed match cast sections, weighing 200 tonnes (200 long tons; 220 short tons) each.

The cable-stayed section of the crossing is over 1,044.7 metres (3,427.5 ft) long, consisting of a 34.6-metre (113.5 ft) wide deck made from steel plate girders with a composite reinforced concrete slab. These were prefabricated on shore and put in place using balanced cantilever methods. There are two high twin-leg, reinforced and pre-stressed concrete pylons carrying 240 cables which support the bridge deck, rising to a height of 149 metres (489 ft) above the river bed or 101 metres (331 ft) above the bridge deck. Cable vibrations were experienced during construction and secondary cables were added to eliminate this. To avoid detracting from the aesthetics of the primary cables, the secondary cables are very slender and are not very noticeable.

During the summer of 1994 the bridge deck launching gantry fell onto the Gwent viaduct, causing the 200-tonne (200-long-ton; 220-short-ton) bridge deck unit to fall onto the deck below. Although this delayed the project by ten weeks, the builders still completed the bridge on schedule two years later.

== Environmental impact ==
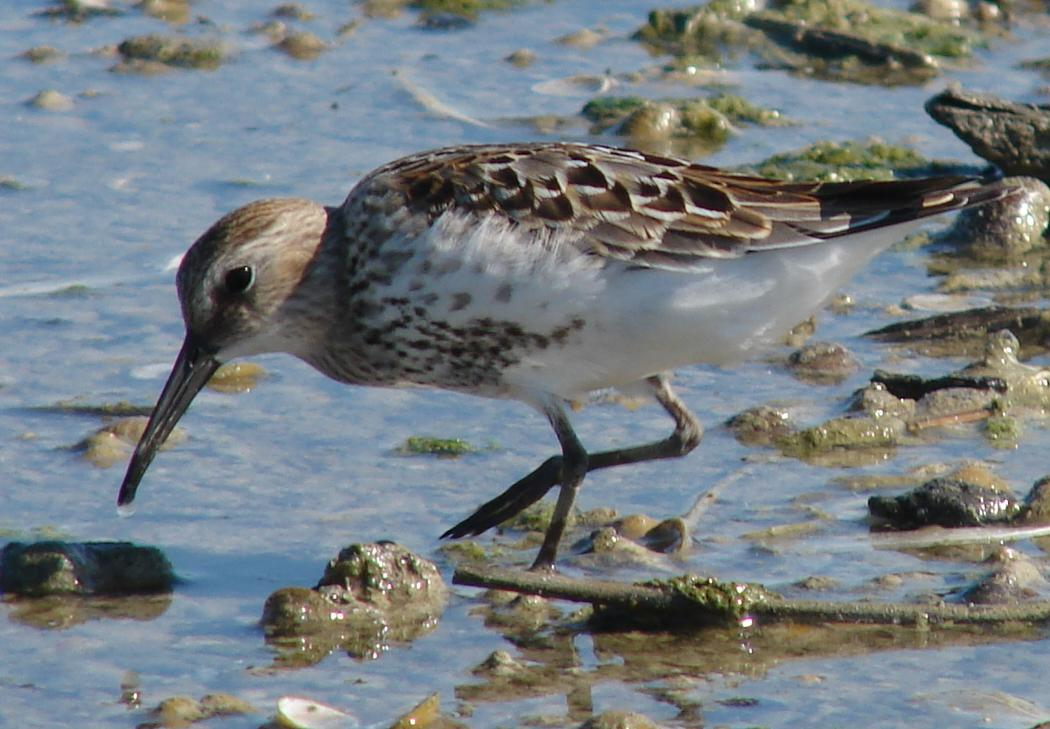
A dunlin feeding, one of the many waders that winter on the Severn estuary

The crossing passes over mudflats in the Severn Estuary with part of the eastern approach viaduct sited on the English Stones, a rocky outcrop uncovered at low tide. The estuary wetlands are home to migrating birds such as the ringed plover, redshank and whimbrel, while the curlew, dunlin and grey plover winter in the area. The birds feed on ragworm, lugworm and other invertebrates. Saltmarsh is found along the fringes of the coast. Beds of eelgrass occur on the more sheltered mud- and sandbanks. In 1976, in recognition of the importance of the estuary as a wetland used by migrating birds, an area of 247 km^{2} (95 sq mi) was designated a Ramsar site. In 1988, the Severn Estuary was designated a Special Protection Area. The same year an area of 99 km^{2} (38 sq mi) was notified as a Site of Special Scientific Interest and designated as such the following year; in 1995, this was extended to cover the whole of the Ramsar site.

Prior to the bridge's construction, environmentalists raised numerous concerns and criticisms, chiefly about the immediate damage from construction work and the effects of long-term pollution from a projected increase in car traffic. The construction process resulted in a temporary increase in turbidity of the Severn waters. Although eelgrass is reasonably tolerant to short-term high turbidity and consequent loss of light, the bed of eelgrass in the river was observed to decline considerably during the period of construction. The construction of the approach roads and toll plaza resulted in the permanent loss of some wet pastureland.

Field surveys carried out in 2003 and 2004 reported that the bridge had little effect on the flight paths of the various birds – it was noted that when curlews, dunlins and lapwings approached the bridge, they would change course to gain height and fly over the bridge, but that oystercatchers and turnstones would fly under the bridge. The surveys also showed that the bridge had minimal impact on the roosting habits of most birds, though a flock of mallards were seen to be roosting directly under the bridge, with many positioning themselves on the dry concrete base on one of the pillars. Likewise, it was noted that the bridge had little impact on the birds' feeding habits – turnstones and lapwings were recorded as feeding on mudflats directly under the bridge while the absence of other waders was attributed to the rocky nature of the foreshore.

== Finances ==
The consortium consisting of two civil engineering firms and two banks that funded and built the bridge had a 30-year concession to redeem its outlay from tolls collected from users of the bridge. At the end of the concession period in January 2018, the bridge passed into public ownership, and is now managed by National Highways.

=== Tolls ===
Toll booths on the Second Severn Crossing

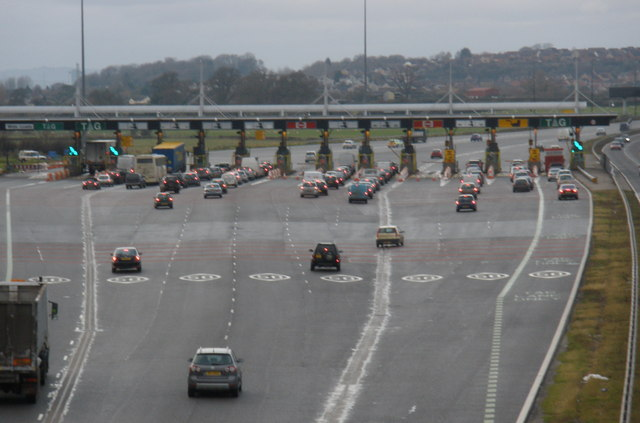
The toll booths in operation in 2007

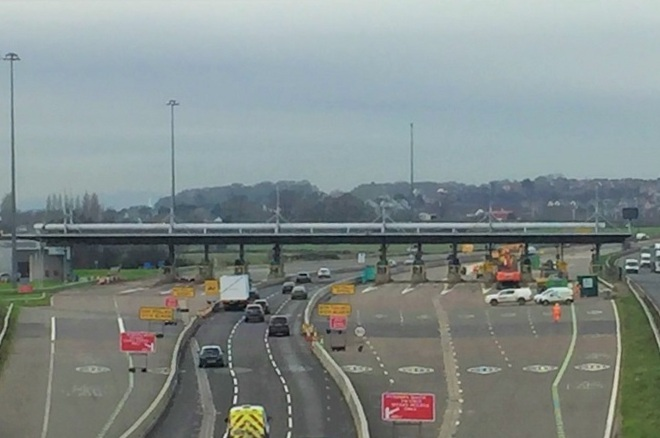
The toll booths being removed in 2019

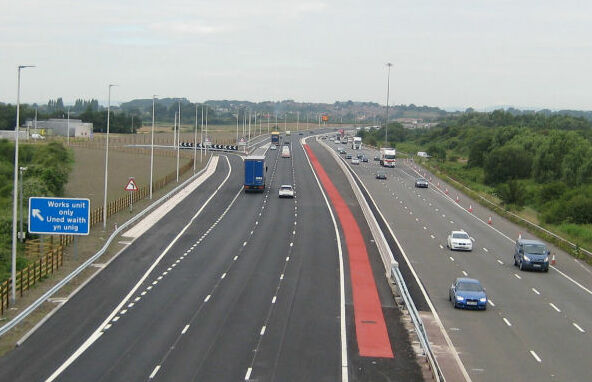
The toll booths completely removed

Tolls were collected from westbound traffic only, near Rogiet, 2 miles (3.2 km) in Wales. Tolls charges were based on a three-tier pricing system: Tolls could be paid by cash, major credit or debit cards, or by use of the Severn TAG system, which was a wireless electronic toll collection system that did not require vehicles to stop.

Motorcycles and UK disabled badge holders travelling in a vehicle were exempted from paying a toll. Toll prices were reviewed annually on 1 January, in accordance with the Severn Bridges Act 1992 (c. 3). In late 2008, UK VAT was reduced from 17.5% to 15%, but the bridge toll remained unchanged. For convenience the tolls were kept at round multiples of 10p (the bridge toll was largely paid in cash as card payments were not accepted until mid-2012), but the 13p VAT reduction was not passed on immediately. In 2009, the planned toll for cars would have been £5.50, as the announcements listed, but the actual toll charged was £5.40. George Osborne, the then Chancellor of the Exchequer, announced in March 2015 that the tolls would be reduced to £5.40 in 2018, due to VAT being removed when the bridge comes into public ownership.

In the 2016 United Kingdom budget, Osborne announced that toll charges on the Severn crossings would be halved in 2018. The toll was due to be cut to £5.40 in 2017 but was increased.

It was reported in 2012 that the repayments were likely to continue until the early 2020s due to the introduction of a revised settlement to the operator in return for accepting payment by debit and credit cards. The announcement said that even after repayment was complete the toll charges would likely remain at the same levels. However, in July 2017 it was announced that the toll would be abolished, In July 2017, the Welsh Secretary, Alun Cairns, announced that tolls would be scrapped at the end of 2018, claiming that this would boost the South Wales economy by around £100m a year. In September 2017, Cairns confirmed that tolls would be reduced in January 2018 as VAT is removed. As announced on 2 October 2018, tolls were abolished on 17 December 2018.

=== Historical toll charges ===
The toll levied was always identical to that on the Severn Bridge.

Toll category	Description
Category 1	Cars and minibuses with up to 9 seats
Category 2	Small buses with up to 17 seats Vans up to 3.5 tonnes Double-cab pickup trucks
Category 3	Buses with more than 17 seats Goods vehicles weighing 3.5 tonnes or more

Date	Category 1	Category 2	Category 3
5 June – 31 December 1996	£3.80	£7.70	£11.50
1 January – 31 December 1997	£3.90	£7.80	£11.70
1 January – 31 December 1998	£4.00	£8.10	£12.10
1 January – 31 December 1999	£4.20	£8.40	£12.50
1 January – 31 December 2000	£4.20	£8.50	£12.70
1 January – 31 December 2001	£4.40	£8.70	£13.10
1 January – 31 December 2002	£4.40	£8.90	£13.30
1 January – 31 December 2003	£4.50	£9.00	£13.50
1 January – 31 December 2004	£4.60	£9.30	£13.90
1 January – 31 December 2005	£4.80	£9.60	£14.30
1 January – 31 December 2006	£4.90	£9.80	£14.70
1 January – 31 December 2007	£5.10	£10.20	£15.30
1 January – 31 December 2008	£5.30	£10.60	£15.90
1 January – 31 December 2009	£5.40	£10.90	£16.30
1 January – 31 December 2010	£5.50	£10.90	£16.40
1 January – 31 December 2011	£5.70	£11.50	£17.20
1 January – 31 December 2012	£6.00	£12.10	£18.10
1 January – 31 December 2013	£6.20	£12.40	£18.60
1 January – 31 December 2014	£6.40	£12.80	£19.20
1 January – 31 December 2015	£6.50	£13.10	£19.60
1 January – 31 December 2016	£6.60	£13.20	£19.80
1 January 2017 – 7 January 2018	£6.70	£13.40	£20.00
8 January – 16 December 2018	£5.60	£11.20	£16.70
17 December 2018 – present	Free		

=== Funding and ownership ===
The bridge was built at a cost of £330 million (excluding VAT) and was owned by the company Severn River Crossing Plc. As of November 2010, Severn River Crossing Plc was owned

- 35% John Laing, British developer infrastructure operator
- 35% Vinci, French concessions and construction company
- 15% Bank of America, American multinational banking and financial services corporation
- 15% Barclays Capital, British multinational investment bank

The company's 2011 annual report showed the same companies still owned, through subsidiary companies, all the issued ordinary share capital of the Plc.

In 2012, changes were made to the agreement to reflect the effect of changes in VAT and Corporation Tax and the costs of installing credit card handling systems. The net effect was to increase the required revenue from £995.83 million to £1,028.91 million in 1989 prices.

Ownership of the crossing and the original Severn Bridge returned to the UK government on 8 January 2018, when the project's required revenue, as defined in the Concession Agreement with the Secretary of State for Transport, had been collected. At that point, responsibility for operating the bridge passed to National Highways.

== Complete closures ==
On 6 February 2009, the bridge was closed completely due to bad weather for the first time since its opening, after a number of vehicles were hit by falling ice. Bad weather, and again falling ice, repeated this in December 2009. Temporary speed limits are put in place due to high winds or thick fog, with drivers informed by the electronic signs. Because of the more advanced aerodynamic design of the later bridge, the Second Crossing is far less concerned to such restrictions caused by crosswinds than the first Severn Bridge.

On 18 February 2022, both the Prince of Wales Bridge and the Severn Bridge were closed completely during Storm Eunice, due to high winds. It was the first time that the Prince of Wales Bridge had been closed because of winds.

On 7 December 2024, both the Prince of Wales Bridge and the Severn Bridge were closed completely again due to high winds from Storm Darragh.

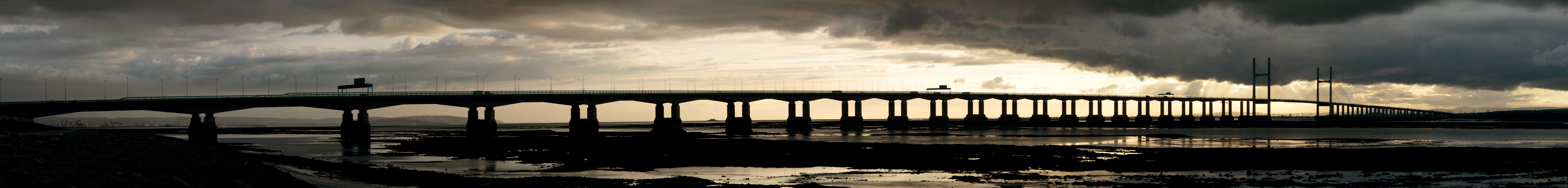
View of the Prince of Wales Bridge from Severn Beach on the English side.

== See also ==
- List of bridges in Wales
- List of crossings of the River Severn
- Aust Severn Powerline Crossing
