= Severn TAG =

The Severn TAG logo, used at toll collection area to indicate a TAG payment lane

The Severn TAG was a payment system for collecting bridge tolls for drivers using either the Severn Bridge Crossing or the Second Severn Crossing over the Severn Estuary between England and Wales.

The system was made by Amtech but was replaced in 2008 by a new system made by CS Eng. To use the system, drivers must place the Tag transponder on their windscreen to identify their vehicle as they drive through the toll lane. Lanes through the toll booths are dedicated as either Tag (unstaffed), cash (staffed) or automatic debit/credit card only.

== Severn TAG types ==
There are three types of Severn TAG

- Season tag: allows the user to purchase a set period of time in which you can cross an unlimited number of times, the tag may only be used on one vehicle and is not transferable between vehicles. A saving can be made if the user makes more than 17 journeys per month in a class 1 vehicle (car). There are different levels of payment for different classes of vehicle.
- Trip Tag: a pay-per-journey tag. Credit is added to an account each month by Direct Debit, cheque, BACS, or Online via the Severn Bridge website. When the user passes through the toll, the amount of the toll is deducted from the account. An indication at each toll lane informs the user that their account credit is low. If there is no money in the account then the Tag is declined and the user must have to pay with cash. The trip tag is transferable between vehicles of the same class.
- Car Pool or Shared Tag: allows between two and five cars to share one tag account. The users are able to obtain one tag and then use it amongst themselves to share the toll, the price of that tag is the same as a season tag however, it can be used on up to five vehicles, and can be temporarily moved to another vehicle within the same class. The tag can only be used by one vehicle in any 24 hour period, but that vehicle can pass as many times as it chooses.

All types of Tag require a £30 Deposit. If the tag is lost or stolen, a replacement is issued after payment of another £30 deposit.

== Limitations and drawbacks ==
The Season TAG could only be used with one registered vehicle, this prevented misuse, however it complicated matters for two car families, users who regularly changed vehicles or those who have courtesy vehicles etc. This was judged a misuse which can result in a Severn River Crossing "Fine" of £25+VAT.

The tags regularly became faulty, and the user could not tell if the tag was faulty until they reached the lane. Whereupon the reader would issue the message "Tag Error" the barrier remains closed and the lane is then blocked. At the Second Severn Crossing with a dedicated "high speed" Tag lane, this could cause a large queue to build up quickly, whilst an attendant would have been called to deal with the faulty tag.

Until January 2016, it was not possible to add funds into a Trip Tag account online, or with a credit or debit card, although it ultimately became possible to top up a Trip Tag balance online, though Trip Tags could not be set to top up automatically when the account balance fell below a set threshold ("auto top-up" as is possible with e.g. the Oyster card and similar electronic tags used on the M6 Toll and Dartford Crossing).

In July 2017 it was announced that all tolls on the bridge would be abolished, and they were discontinued on 17 December 2018.

== See also ==
- Electronic toll collection
