= Severn crossing =

Set of motorway bridges

Map showing the Severn road and rail crossings, the Severn Bridge (top right), Severn Tunnel and Prince of Wales Bridge (Second Severn Crossing) (bottom left)

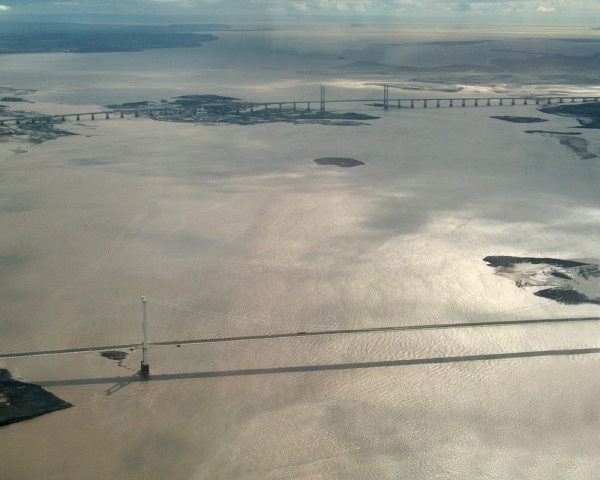
Aerial view of both Severn bridges. The older Severn Bridge is in the foreground and the newer Prince of Wales Bridge in the background.

Severn crossing is a term used to refer to the two motorway crossings over the River Severn estuary between England and Wales operated by England's National Highways. The two crossings are:

- Severn Bridge (Welsh: Pont Hafren)
- Prince of Wales Bridge (Welsh: Pont Tywysog Cymru), until 2018 known as the Second Severn Crossing (Ail Groesfan Hafren).

The first motorway suspension bridge was inaugurated on 8 September 1966, and the newer cable-stayed bridge, a few miles to the south, was inaugurated on 5 June 1996. The Second Severn crossing stands more or less where the mid Severn Estuary becomes the upper estuary. It was officially renamed the Prince of Wales Bridge on 2 July 2018. From 1966 to 1996, the first bridge, from Aust on the English side to Chepstow, carried the M4 motorway. On completion of the Second Severn crossing, the motorway crossing the first bridge was renamed the M48.

The two Severn crossings are regarded as the main crossing points from England into South Wales. Before 1966 road traffic between the southern counties of Wales and the southern counties of England had either to travel via Gloucester or to take the Aust Ferry, which ran roughly along the line of the Severn Bridge, from Old Passage near Aust to Beachley. The ferry ramps at Old Passage and Beachley are still visible.

Until 17 December 2018, tolls were collected on both crossings from vehicles travelling in a westward direction only; the toll for small vehicles was £5.60. The Severn Crossing reverted to public ownership on 8 January 2018, run by National Highways.

== Railway crossings ==
The Severn Tunnel, carrying mainline trains under the Severn along the South Wales Main Line has been followed in its original route by the Second Severn Crossing.

From 1879 until its collapse in 1960 the Severn Railway Bridge also carried trains across the Severn from Sharpness to Lydney.

== Future ==
=== Severn Barrage proposal ===
A proposed Severn Barrage could constitute a third crossing. The Severn Tidal Power Feasibility Study noted that "some commentators have suggested that a barrage across the Severn estuary should carry a new road or rail link." The report concluded that additional crossings would be unnecessary. A 2022 proposal also did not include any new road or rail link.

=== 2018 Third Severn Crossing proposal ===
The county of Gloucestershire's 2050 Vision was launched in 2018, and contains a proposal for a third Severn Crossing between Lydney and Sharpness. This would replicate the former Severn Bridge Railway.

== See also ==
- Aust Severn Powerline Crossing
- List of crossings of the River Severn
- List of bridges in Wales
