= List of disasters on the Severn =

The following is a list of notable accidents on the River Severn and Severn Estuary, which runs through England and Wales. The river is the longest river in Britain and at its mouth has the second highest rise and fall of tide in the world.

== 17th century ==
- 30 January 1607, Bristol Channel floods, 1607 – the Bristol Channel and Severn Estuary were devastated by a flood. Long considered as a storm, recent investigations point to a possible tsunami.

== 18th century ==
- 23 October 1799, the ferry at The Tuckies carrying workers from Coalport China Works capsized and 28 were drowned.

== 19th century ==
- 6 February 1809, the Newnham on Severn to Arlingham Passage ferryboat sank in full view of people on both banks of the Severn. Two boatmen on board drowned.
- 1 February 1868, at the bridge over the Severn at Caersws an approach embankment, damaged by flood water, collapsed under a goods train. The driver and fireman were killed.

== 20th century ==
- 4 August 1919, on this Bank Holiday Monday pleasure boats were taking people on trips between Gloucester and Stourport. One boat, the May Queen, came downriver passing the Hampstall Ferry, (located between Stourport and Holt Fleet), at speed. The ferryboat lurched and all 17 passengers were tipped into the river. Some witnesses said the ferry was overloaded. Nine people were drowned.
- 4 February 1939, three tanker barges overturned in the estuary off Sharpness. They were taken with the tide into the piers of the Severn Railway Bridge. Of the eight man crew, six men were killed
- 3 April 1947, a British ship, the 1,580 ton Stancliffe, went aground off Sharpness loaded with 3,000 tons of timber. Local shipyard engineer, Ivor Langford, managed to cut the vessel in two and sail both parts down to Cardiff Docks. There the two halves were joined together and the ship sailed again under the new name of Gripfast.
- 23 March 1951, a large 4,845 ton Egyptian registered ship Ramses II was bound for Sharpness loaded with 7,000 tons of maize from Russia when she ran aground on Lydney Sands. Unable to float her off, the cargo had to be unloaded out in the estuary into smaller craft. Eventually she became a total loss. The wreck can be seen occasionally above the mud at low water.
- 4 February, 1954, a Bristol Britannia G-ALRX prototype plane was forced to land in the River Serven Mudflats with retracted gear. Engine 3 on plane exploded during flight. The plane could not return to Filton and had to make emergency landing. Her crew and passengers escaped harm. The plane was a total loss due to time to recover of 48 hours, salty tidewater covering the fuselage, and stress on fuselage in efforts to pull it to shore.
- 25 October 1960, two loaded tanker barges, the Arkendale H and the Wastdale H were off Sharpness when they came together in thick fog. The tide took them into a pier of the Severn Railway Bridge and two spans came crashing down onto the barges. There was an explosion and of the eight man crew, five were killed.
- 16 February 1961, the Loss of the BP Explorer: The BP Explorer was loaded and bound for Sharpness from Swansea. As the loaded tanker barge made her way up the Severn Estuary she suddenly turned over. It was not until the following day that the tanker barge was seen bouncing her way, upside down, through the wrecked Severn Railway Bridge. Her crew of five men were killed. The BP Explorer was salvaged and rebuilt as the BP Driver, but on 31 January 1962 she was driven aground at Nash Point; fortunately her crew were saved.
- 19 November 1961, during construction of the Severn Bridge three men fell into the river. The alarm was raised and a rescue boat crewed by two men set sail from Chepstow. Unknown to the crew of the rescue boat the three men had been picked up safely by the last crossing of the day of one of the Aust to Beachley ferry boats, the Severn Princess. Two tanker barges were coming down empty from Sharpness, the Wyesdale H and the Wharfedale H, tied together and both being steered from the Wyesdale H. The steersman failed to see the rescue boat, as the boat had no navigation lights, and both barges collided with it. One man was saved, but the other crew member of the rescue boat was drowned.
- 4 September 1990, three men were working in one of the four maintenance gantries attached to the underside of the Severn Bridge, carrying out routine maintenance work. The gantry gave way plunging the three men into the Severn. Mark Seaton (19), a painter, survived the 150 ft (46 m) drop, but Robin Phelps (44) and Eric Sullivan (46) were killed.

== See also ==
- Crossings of the River Severn
- List of shipwrecks in the Bristol Channel (for shipwrecks downstream of the Severn Bridge)
- Severn Area Rescue Association
