= List of crossings of the River Severn =

Motorway crossings over the River Severn

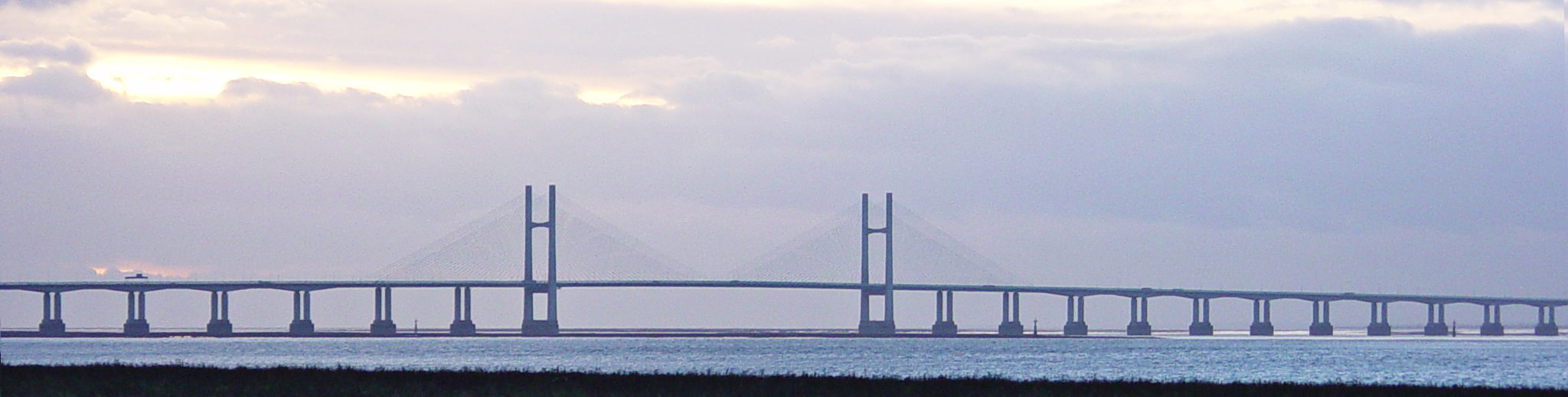
Prince of Wales Bridge (M4 motorway)

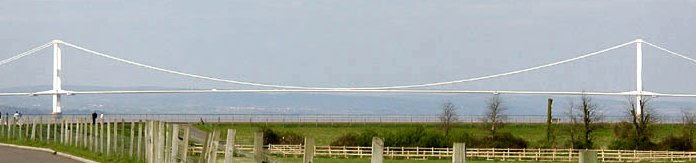
Severn Bridge (M48 motorway)

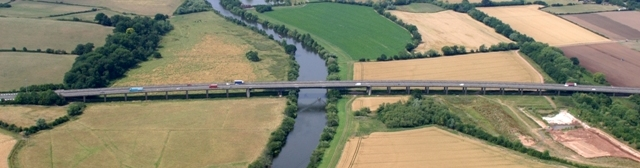
Queenhill Viaduct (M50 motorway)

This is a list of crossings of the River Severn in Great Britain (including bridges, tunnels, ferries and fords), in order from source to mouth.

The Severn has historically been a very important and busy river, and has been bridged throughout history. The bridges that stand today are often of great historical and/or engineering interest. For example, the world's first iron bridge, The Iron Bridge, built from cast iron, crosses the River Severn at Ironbridge Gorge. The Iron Bridge is one of three bridges on the River Severn that are listed as grade I structures, including Bewdley Bridge and the Severn Bridge, which was opened in 1966. In total, 31 bridges that cross the River Severn are listed, either grade I, II* or II. Four bridges are scheduled monuments, including The Iron Bridge, which are nationally important archaeological bridges.

Many reaches of the Severn are prone to severe flooding, prompting the design of some unique bridges to cope with this.

There were historically also ferry crossings on the tidal river at:

- Minsterworth
- Framilode
- Purton, Lydney
- Newnham on Severn

== Crossings ==
Key to heritage status
Status	Criteria
I	Grade I listed. Bridge of exceptional interest, sometimes considered to be internationally important
II*	Grade II* listed. Particularly important bridge of more than special interest
II	Grade II listed. Bridge of national importance and special interest
SM	Scheduled monument. Nationally important archaeological bridge.

In order, moving downstream:

Crossing	Date	Coordinates	Heritage status	Locality	Notes	Image
The source of the River Severn		52.49347°N 3.73458°W	-	Plynlimon	Included for completeness	
First culvert on the Severn		52.48855°N 3.72676°W	-	Hafren Forest	Provides Forestry Access. Also carries the Severn Way long-distance footpath from left bank to right bank when heading downstream.	
First footbridge on the Severn		52.48681°N 3.72227°W	-	Hafren Forest	Carries the Severn Way long-distance footpath from right bank to left bank when heading downstream.	
Blaen Hafren Falls culvert		52.48151°N 3.71618°W	-	Hafren Forest	Provides forestry access. Also carries Severn Way long-distance footpath from left bank to right bank when heading downstream.	
Second footbridge on the Severn	1992	52.47276°N 3.70141°W	-	Hafren Forest	Previously known as the 'First Bridge on the Severn'. Opened May 1992 by Lady Hooson, wife of Emlyn Hooson, Baron Hooson. Also carries Severn Way long-distance footpath from right bank to left bank when heading downstream. The Wye Valley Walk long-distance footpath starts here.	
Rhyd-y-Benwch Ford		52.46847°N 3.68475°W	-	Hafren Forest	First ford on the Severn. Provides forestry access.	
Rhyd-y-Benwch Footbridge	1997	52.46716°N 3.68180°W	-	Hafren Forest		
Cwm Ricket Bridge		52.46636°N 3.67824°W	-	Cwm Ricket	First road bridge on the river. Weight limit of 12.5T.	
Cwm Ricket Pipe Bridge		52.46632°N 3.67775°W	-	Cwm Ricket	Previously known as Irish Bridge and Paddy's Bridge. Provides forestry access, as nearby Cwm Ricket Bridge has a 12.5T weight limit. With high water, it becomes a ford.	
Severn Break Its Neck Footbridge	1995	52.46665°N 3.67500°W	-	Rhyd-yr-Onnen	Provides view of waterfall and gorge.	
Rhyd-yr-Onnen Footbridge		52.46541°N 3.66407°W	-	Rhyd-yr-Onnen		
Hafodfeddgar Farm Bridge		52.45902°N 3.65694°W	-	Hafodfeddgar	Provides farm access.	
Geufron Farm Bridge		52.45634°N 3.64720°W	-	Geufron	Provides farm access.	
Tynwtra Footbridge		52.45396°N 3.63637°W	-	Tan Hinon	Has been dismantled - only abutments remain.	
Glynhafren Farm Bridge		52.44850°N 3.62806°W	-	Glynhafren	Provides farm access.	
Old Hall Ford		52.44819°N 3.61448°W	-	Old Hall	Provides farm access.	
Glanhafren Bridge	1972	52.44804°N 3.60761°W	-	Old Hall	First tarmac-surfaced road bridge on the Severn.	
Nantyrhebog Footbridge		52.45068°N 3.57978°W	-	Glan-y-Nant		
Cancoed Footbridge		52.44294°N 3.55540°W	-	Glan-y-Nant		
Felindre Bridge	1848	52.44294°N 3.55540°W	II	Mount Severn	Designed by Thomas Penson, masonry arch bridge	
Colonel's Bridge	1975	52.44465°N 3.54839°W	-	Llanidloes	Timber bridge also known as Pen-y-Green Bridge, named after Colonel Davies-Jenkins	
Short Bridge	1850	52.44911°N 3.54242°W	II	Llanidloes	Designed by Thomas Penson	
Long Bridge	1826	52.45104°N 3.53923°W	II	Llanidloes	Designed by Thomas Penson, carried the B4518 road.	
Morfodion Farm Bridge	1859	52.45735°N 3.50879°W	-	Llanidloes	Timber bridge built as part of the Llanidloes and Newtown Railway, later becoming part of the Cambrian Railway's route from Newtown to Builth Wells; the railway was closed on 31 December 1962. Now used as a farm access bridge.	
Dolwen Bridge	1926	52.45541°N 3.47737°W	-	Upper Penrhuddlan		
Llandinam Bridge	1843	52.48645°N 3.43698°W	II*	Llandinam	Iron arch bridge designed by Thomas Penson, the first of its type in Montgomeryshire.	
Caersws Railway Bridge		52.51392°N 3.42867°W	-	Caersws	Timber bridge carries the Cambrian Line.	
Caersws Bridge	1821	52.51439°N 3.42713°W	II	Caersws	Triple span arch bridge designed by Thomas Penson. Carries the A470 road.	
Festival Footbridge	1951	52.52130°N 3.38919°W	-	Aberhafesp	Suspension footbridge built by David Rowell & Co.	
Penstrowed Railway Bridge		52.50905°N 3.36515°W	-	Penstrowed	Carries the Cambrian Line.	
Glanhafren Hall Railway Bridge		52.50594°N 3.35230°W	-	Glanhafren Hall	Carries the Cambrian Line.	
Dolerw Park Footbridge	1973	52.51497°N 3.31998°W	-	Newtown, Powys	Suspension footbridge designed by Mott, Hay and Anderson	
The Long Bridge	1827	52.51707°N 3.31675°W	II	Newtown	Designed by Thomas Penson.	
Halfpenny Footbridge	1972	52.51548°N 3.31325°W	-	Newtown	Fourth bridge on this site, the first dating from 1830	
Newtown Bypass Bridge	1993	52.51482°N 3.30933°W	-	Newtown	Carries the B4568 road, Cambrian Way.	
Newtown Active Travel Bridge	2025	52.517935°N 3.304413°W	-	Newtown	Steel single-span footbridge, funded by the Welsh government and Transport for Wales. Opened alongside outdoor gym equipment.	
Cilgwrgan Bridge	1862	52.5314°N 3.2638°W	II	Aberbechan	3-span brickwork arch bridge	
Abermule Bypass Bridge	1975	52.54098°N 3.24416°W	-	Abermule		
Brynderwen Bridge	1852	52.54774°N 3.23657°W	II*	Abermule	Designed by Thomas Penson, built by the Brymbo Company of Wrexham. Bridge is inscribed: THIS SECOND IRON BRIDGE CONSTRUCTED IN THE COUNTY OF MONTGOMERY WAS ERECTED IN THE YEAR 1852.	
Fron Footbridge	1926	52.56815°N 3.20727°W	-	Plas Meredydd	Suspension footbridge by David Rowell & Co	
Caerhowel Bridge	1858	52.57509°N 3.18681°W	II	Trwstllewelyn	Designed by Thomas Penson. Bridge is narrow, with traffic lights.	
Cil-cewydd Bridge	1861	52.62906°N 3.14230°W	II	Cil-cewydd	Designed by Thomas Penson.	
Cil-cewydd Railway Bridge		52.62964°N 3.14179°W	-	Cil-cewydd	Built for Oswestry and Newtown Railway	
Leighton Bridge	1872	52.65505°N 3.12958°W	II	Welshpool	Carries the B4381 road. The listing description is "Bridge over channel N of Severn Lodge".	
Buttington Railway Bridge		52.67185°N 3.11573°W	-	Welshpool		
Buttington Bridge	1872	52.67253°N 3.11616°W	II	Welshpool	Cast iron arch bridge, carries the A458 road.	
Maginnis Bridge		52.6964°N 3.0983°W	-	Pool Quay		
Llandrinio Bridge	1775	52.74595°N 3.04085°W	II	Llandrinio	Stone arch bridge. Oldest surviving bridge on the river. Bridge is narrow with traffic lights.	
Crewgreen Bridge	1947	52.73546°N 2.99390°W	-	Crewgreen	Built as a railway bridge but converted to a road bridge. Crosses from Wales to England.	
Montford Bypass Bridge	1992	52.73096°N 2.84589°W	-	Montford	Carries the A5 road. Designed by Sir Owen Williams and Partners as part of the A5 Telford to Shrewsbury and A49 link improvement.	
Montford Bridge	1792	52.73221°N 2.84262°W	II	Montford Bridge	Masonry arch bridge by Thomas Telford. Former A5 route, now carries the B4380 road.	
Frankwell Footbridge	1979	52.71064°N 2.75501°W	-	Frankwell, Shrewsbury	Cable-stayed footbridge designed by Mott, Hay and Anderson	
St George's Bridge		52.71028°N 2.75667°W	-	Shrewsbury	Demolished in 1795 and replaced by the Welsh Bridge. It was also known as the Old Welsh Bridge.	
Welsh Bridge	1795	52.71013°N 2.75807°W	II*	Frankwell, Shrewsbury		
Porthill Bridge	1922	52.70842°N 2.76371°W	-	Shrewsbury	Suspension footbridge by David Rowell & Co	
Kingsland Bridge	1881	52.70437°N 2.75895°W	II	Shrewsbury	Toll road bridge	
Greyfriars Footbridge	1879	52.70467°N 2.74893°W	-	Coleham, Shrewsbury	Wrought iron truss bridge	
English Bridge	1927	52.70660°N 2.74748°W	II*	Shrewsbury	Designed by John Gwynn. Completely rebuilt in the 1920s using the original 1774 stone work, but the bridge was widened by 26 feet (7.9 m) and the gradient reduced; reopened on 26 October 1927. (The 1774 Bridge replaced the medieval East or Old Stone Bridge.) It carries the A458 road.	
Shrewsbury Railway Station Bridge	1838	52.71069°N 2.74782°W	-	Shrewsbury station	Designed by Robert Stephenson and Joseph Locke.	
Castle Walk Footbridge	1951	52.71250°N 2.74382°W	-	Shrewsbury	The first prestressed concrete balanced cantilever bridge in the UK	
Telford Way Bridge	1964	52.72242°N 2.73255°W	-	Shrewsbury	Prestressed concrete bridge. Designed by Scott Wilson Group, it carries the A5112 road.	
Shrewsbury Bypass Bridge	1992	52.72236°N 2.70667°W	-	Shrewsbury	Carries the A49 road.	
Shrewsbury Bypass Bridge	1992	52.71701°N 2.70478°W	-	Shrewsbury	Carries the A49 road.	
Belvidere Bridge	1848	52.70825°N 2.71271°W	II*	Shrewsbury	Designed by William Baker; carries the Wolverhampton to Shrewsbury Line.	
Shrewsbury Bypass Bridge	1992	52.69417°N 2.70942°W	-	Shrewsbury	Carries the A5/A49.	
Atcham New Bridge	1929	52.6798°N 2.6813°W	-	Atcham	Designed by L G Mouchel	
Atcham Bridge	1776	52.67948°N 2.68124°W	II*	Atcham	Masonry arch viaduct designed by John Gwynn	
Atcham Bridge	1776	52.67948°N 2.68124°W	SM	Atcham	Masonry arch viaduct designed by John Gwynn	
Cressage Bridge	1913	52.6371°N 2.6017°W	-	Cressage	Carries the B4380 road. Reinforced concrete bridge by L G Mouchel	
Buildwas Bridge	1992	52.63642°N 2.52567°W	-	Buildwas	Carries the A4169 road. Replaced a bridge previously built in 1796 by Thomas Telford	
Ironbridge "A" Road Bridge (disused)	1932	52.63637°N 2.51293°W	-	Ironbridge	Coalbrookdale. Steel truss bridge providing access to Ironbridge Power Station	
Ironbridge "B" Road Bridge	1963	52.63298°N 2.50683°W	-	Ironbridge	Coalbrookdale. Prestressed concrete bridge providing access to Ironbridge Power Station	
Albert Edward Bridge	1864	52.63061°N 2.50333°W	II		Designed by John Fowler; carries the remaining section of the Wellington to Craven Arms Railway	
The Iron Bridge	1779	52.6273°N 2.4855°W	I	Ironbridge	Arch bridge; the world's first cast iron bridge, built by Abraham Darby III, now foot access only. In the 1970s, major work was undertaken to restore the bridge, including an inverted concrete arch in the river bed to keep the abutments apart.	
The Iron Bridge	1779	52.6273°N 2.4855°W	SM	Ironbridge	Arch bridge; the world's first cast iron bridge, built by Abraham Darby III, now foot access only. In the 1970s, major work was undertaken to restore the bridge, including an inverted concrete arch in the river bed to keep the abutments apart.	
Free Bridge, Jackfield	1909	52.62649°N 2.47259°W	II	Jackfield	The Free Bridge, which was also known as the Haynes Memorial Bridge, opened in 1909 by public subscription, it was the first toll-free crossing of the Ironbridge Gorge. The bridge was the first bridge in England constructed using reinforced concrete and was designed by L G Mouchel. The bridge became unsafe and was demolished in 1993 to make way for the new Jackfield Bridge.	
Jackfield Bridge	1994	52.62649°N 2.47259°W	-	Jackfield	Cable-stayed bridge designed by Gifford & Partners, carrying the B4373 road.	
Jackfield and Coalport Memorial Footbridge	1922	52.61985°N 2.45369°W	-	Coalport	A steel truss footbridge	
Coalport Bridge	1818	52.61537°N 2.44208°W	II*	Coalport	Iron arch bridge, replaced a crossing built in 1777	
Coalport Bridge	1818	52.61537°N 2.44208°W	SM	Coalport	Iron arch bridge, replaced a crossing built in 1777	
Coalport Sewage Treatment Works Bridge		52.61115°N 2.43211°W	-	Coalport	Bridge serving the Coalport Sewage Treatment Works, owned by Severn Trent Water	
Apley Park Bridge	1905	52.5819°N 2.4345°W	-		Suspension footbridge, designed and built by David Rowell & Co. This is a private road bridge for the Apley Park Estate, and is not a public footpath. Weight limit is 1 tonne, and only one vehicle allowed on the bridge at a time.	
Severn Bridge, Bridgnorth	1823	52.53413°N 2.41613°W	II	Bridgnorth	Originally medieval, but rebuilt in 1795 with improvements made Thomas Telford in 1823	
Bridgnorth Bypass Bridge	1985	52.52739°N 2.41721°W	-	Bridgnorth	A458	
Hampton Loade Water Treatment Works bridge	1965	52.48092°N 2.37533°W	-	Hampton Loade	Bridge serving the Hampton Loade Water Treatment Works. The tubular welded blue arches are waterpipes that carry a small roadway suspended below. The bridge is owned by South Staffordshire Water.	
Hampton Loade Ferry	<1600	52.47606°N 2.37391°W	-	Hampton Loade	The only 'Reaction Cable' ferry in the UK. The most recent boat dated from 2004. It was 20 feet (6.1 m) by 9 feet (2.7 m) and carried up to 12 passengers plus the operator. Was operated by the Hampton Loade Community Trust at weekends during the summer provided the river level was suitable. Closed permanently in 2016.	
Highley-Alveley Footbridge	2006	52.45265°N 2.37136°W	-	Highley	Replaced the Alveley Colliery Bridge, which was built in 1937 to take coal to Stourport Power Station.	
Upper Arley Ferry	1331–1972	52.41920°N 2.34740°W	-	Upper Arley	Ancient ferry, replaced by the Arley footbridge	
Arley footbridge	1971	52.41820°N 2.34578°W	-	Upper Arley	Truss footbridge, replaced a vehicular ferry	
Victoria Bridge	1861	52.41048°N 2.34476°W	II*	Upper Arley.	Cast iron arch designed by John Fowler. Carries the Severn Valley Railway.	
Elan aqueduct	circa 1900	52.40117°N 2.33145°W	-	Trimpley	Carries water from the Elan Valley at Rhayader to Birmingham. It is also known as the Elan Valley Pipeline Bridge	
Dowles Bridge	1864	52.38531°N 2.32495°W	-		On the former Tenbury & Bewdley Railway; dismantled 1965, piers only remaining.	
Bewdley Bridge	1798	52.37646°N 2.31390°W	I	Bewdley	Multiple masonry arches, designed by Thomas Telford. Listed as "Severn Bridge Including Flanking Arches and Balustrade".	
Bewdley Bypass Bridge	1987	52.36629°N 2.30411°W	-	Bewdley	Carries the A456 road	
Stourport Bridge	1870	52.33713°N 2.28318°W	II	Stourport-on-Severn	Single iron arch, replaced a 1775 bridge. Listed as "Bridge over River Severn"	
Holt Fleet Bridge	1828	52.26818°N 2.25889°W	II	Holt Fleet	Cast iron trussed arch; designed by Telford, opened 1828 and strengthened with reinforced concrete in 1928. Identical design to Galton Bridge, Smethwick over canal (1829).	
Bevere Island Bridge	1844	52.23282°N 2.23913°W	-	Grimley	Links island to East bank; not a full crossing.	
Kepax Bridge	2025	52.20747°N 2.23542°W	-	Worcester	Asymmetrical, cable-stayed bridge with one tower for pedestrians and cyclists.	
Sabrina Footbridge	1992	52.19445°N 2.23205°W	-	Worcester	Asymmetrical, cable-stayed bridge with one tower for pedestrians and cyclists.	
Worcester Railway Bridge	1904	52.19310°N 2.22974°W	II	Worcester	Iron truss. Listed as "Railway Bridge, Worcester". Carries the Cotswold Line over the river near Worcester Foregate Street station.	
Worcester Bridge	1781	52.19083°N 2.22632°W	II	Worcester	Multiple masonry arches designed by John Gwynn. Reconstructed in 1930. Carried the A44	
Worcester Cathedral Ferry	Ancient	52.18785°N 2.22279°W	-	Worcester	Also known as Priory Ferry. Operated every day till the 1950s. Service restarted in 1983. As of 2009, it is the only Rowing Ferry across the River Severn; it is operated by volunteers during the summer, every afternoon at weekends and bank holidays.	
Diglis Bridge	June 2010	52.17624°N 2.22474°W	-	Worcester	Located just downstream of Diglis Island. Carrying pedestrians and Route 46 of the National Cycle Network	
Carrington Bridge	1985	52.16290°N 2.21774°W	-	Worcester	Carrying the A4440 Southern Link Road	
Rhydd Ferry		52.1048°N 2.2389°W	-	Worcester	Ferry was working until approximately 1914.	
Upton-upon-Severn bridge	1940	52.06560°N 2.21767°W	-	Upton-upon-Severn	Girder bridge, latest of several here dating back to 1539.	
Upton-upon-Severn Railway Bridge		52.04966°N 2.20106°W	-	Upton-upon-Severn	Former bridge of the Tewkesbury and Malvern Railway, which was part of the Midland Railway. The currently closed line ran from Great Malvern to Tewkesbury. Demolished bridge over the river.	
Queenhill Viaduct	1960	52.03026°N 2.19541°W	-	Queenhill	Carrying the M50 Motorway	
Mythe Bridge	1826	52.00203°N 2.16358°W	II*	Mythe	Near Tewkesbury. Cast iron arch, built by Thomas Telford. Opened as a toll bridge; now free. Major repair work in 1993/94; now single lane with 3 m width limit and 17 ton weight limit and controlled by traffic lights. Crosses from Worcestershire to Gloucestershire.	
Haw Bridge	1961	51.94899°N 2.22671°W	-	Near the village of Apperley	West of Tewkesbury. steel beam bridge.	
X X						
The River Severn splits at the Upper Parting between the 2-mile-long (3.2 km) West Channel, known locally as the Maisemore Channel, and the 3.6-mile-long (5.8 km) East Channel around Alney Island
X X
West Channel crossings
Maisemore Bridge	1956	51.88860°N 2.26772°W	-	Maisemore	Carries the A417. Single masonry arch, latest of several bridges here dating back to 1230.	
New Over Bridge (Northern Bypass)	1974	51.87501°N 2.26790°W	-	Gloucester	A40	
Over Bridge	1829	51.87448°N 2.26797°W	SM	Gloucester	Single masonry arch, built by Thomas Telford.	
Over Railway Bridge	1957	51.87378°N 2.26818°W	-	Gloucester	Railway bridge on the Gloucester to Newport Line. Originally the lowest railway crossing downstream as part of the South Wales Railway, until the construction of the Severn Tunnel.	
East Channel crossings
Walham Viaduct (Northern Bypass)	1983	51.8755°N 2.2604°W	-	Gloucester	A40	
St Catherine's Viaduct		51.8728°N 2.2572°W	-	Gloucester	Railway bridge on the Gloucester to Newport Line.	
Westgate Bridge (eastbound)	2000	51.86997°N 2.25661°W	-	Gloucester	A417. It replaced an earlier bridge opened in 1974.	
Westgate Footbridge	1974	51.86977°N 2.25669°W	-	Gloucester		
Westgate Bridge (westbound)	2000	51.86957°N 2.25682°W	-	Gloucester	A417. It replaced earlier bridges opened in 1189, 1809 and 1974.	
Castle Meads Footbridge	1987	51.86454°N 2.25329°W	-	Gloucester		
Castle Meads Bridge	2005	51.86262°N 2.25743°W	-	Gloucester	A430	
Llanthony Railway Bridge (disused)		51.86252°N 2.25816°W	-	Gloucester		
Disused footbridge		51.86234°N 2.25906°W	-	Gloucester		
The East and West Channels rejoin at the Lower Parting
Severn tunnel (1810)	1810	51.78770°N 2.44598°W	-	Newnham on Severn	Failed attempt to build a tunnel, abandoned after water broke in	
Severn Railway Bridge	1876	51.73234°N 2.47441°W	-	Lydney – Sharpness	Demolished 1970 after accident.	
Severn-Wye Cable Tunnel	1973	East 51.6083446°N 2.6153657°W; West 51.61098°N 2.66921°W	-	Beachley – Aust	The tunnel is 47.5 m (156 ft) deep, with a diameter of 3.05 m (10 ft) and a total length of 3,678 m (2.285 mi). The tunnel carries two 400 kV circuits, each with three cables. The tunnel is owned by National Grid. The image to the right shows the cables on pylons entering the Aust (eastern) end of the tunnel before going underground.	
Severn Bridge	1966	51.60903°N 2.63837°W	I	Chepstow – Aust	Steel suspension bridge. Listed as "Severn Bridge and Aust Viaduct, First Severn Crossing".	
Aust Ferry	1827	51.59888°N 2.63301°W	-	Beachley – Aust	Closed circa 1860. Service recommenced 1926, finally closed 1966.	
Aust Severn Powerline Crossing	1959	51.60578°N 2.64136°W	-		Longest powerline span in the UK at 1 mile (1,618 metres).	
New Passage Ferry	1863	East 51.574571°N 2.660611°W; West 51.589955°N 2.703867°W		New Passage - Black Rock	Railway ferry link on the Bristol and South Wales Union Railway	
Severn Tunnel	1886	51.575°N 2.6889°W	-		Railway tunnel, part of the South Wales Main Line.	
Prince of Wales Bridge (formerly known as Second Severn Crossing)	1996	51.57331°N 2.69725°W	-		A cable-stayed bridge which marks the official start of the Severn Estuary.	

== See also ==
- Severn crossing
- List of crossings of the River Wye
- List of bridges in Wales
- List of disasters on the Severn
- Severn bore
- Severn Way

== Bibliography ==
- Witts, Chris (1998). A Century of Bridges (2nd ed.). Gloucester: River Severn Publications. ISBN 978-0-9532711-0-8.
