= Castle Walk Footbridge =

Bridge in Shrewsbury, England

Coordinates: 52°42′45″N 2°44′38″W

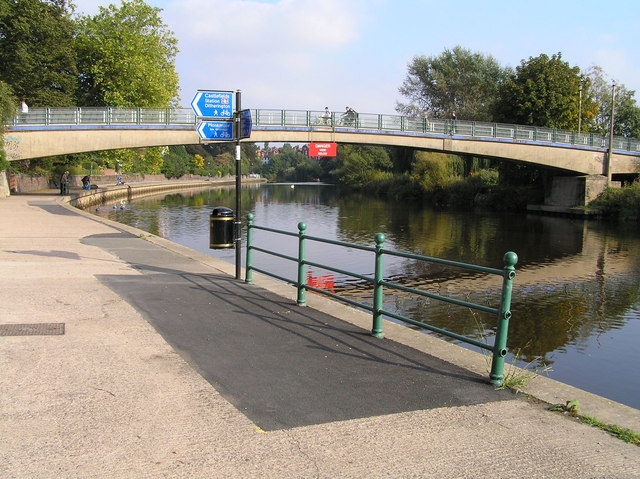
Castle Walk Footbridge

Castle Walk Footbridge spans the River Severn in Shrewsbury, England, and was the first prestressed concrete bridge in Shropshire.

The footbridge was completed in November 1951, and built using balanced cantilever construction, with two cantilever sections and a central suspended span. The total central span is 150 ft. It was designed by L.G. Mouchel and Partners and built by Taylor Woodrow.

It links the Castlefields area of the town to the northwest with the Cherry Orchard/Underdale part of town to the southeast.

== See also ==
- Crossings of the River Severn
