= Hafren Forest =

Forest in Central Wales, United Kingdom

Coordinates: 52.4788°N 3.6917°W

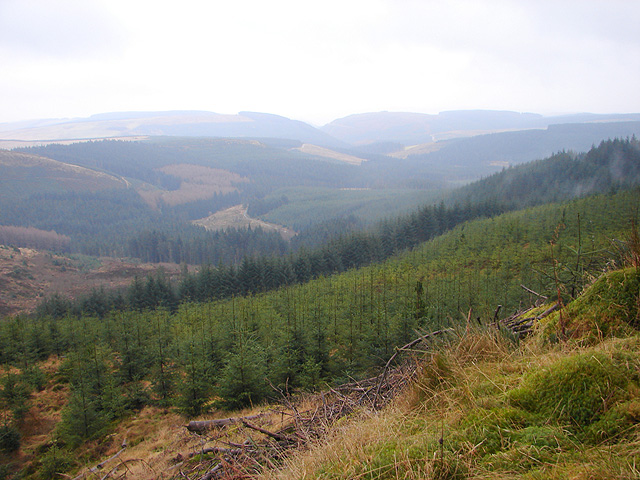
Hafren Forest

Hafren Forest (Welsh: Coedwig Hafren) is a wooded area north-west of the ancient market town of Llanidloes, Mid Wales.

The forest covers around 40 square kilometres (15 square miles), and consists mainly of pine and spruce trees. It takes its name from the Afon Hafren (Welsh for 'River Severn') which rises in a deep peat bog approximately 800 metres (0.5 miles) outside western boundary of the forest, high on the slopes of Pumlumon, the highest mountain in Mid Wales.

== History ==
The forest, planted in 1937, is continually changing with felling and planting of trees. The forest is also home to Bronze Age copper and lead mines, most notably "Nant yr Eira" and possibly "Nant yr Rickett".

The creation of the forest in 1937 involved the purchase of twelve upland sheep farms, including "Rhyd y Benwch" which is now the location of a car park and picnic area.

Although the farms were not left derelict, they could not provide enough accommodation for forest workers in this sparsely populated area. At first, with the initial small size of the forest, enough workers could be found locally. Later, workers were transported from Llanidloes. This was unsustainable, and in 1948, the Forestry Commission decided to build a village near Staylittle, to house forestry workers. They employed an eminent architect, T. Alwyn Lloyd of Cardiff, to produce plans for a village that would eventually comprise eighty houses, a village shop, school and hall. As a first development, twenty houses were built on the site, with eight more a few miles away: these provided accommodation for half the workers. Construction began in 1949, with the first houses being occupied in 1951. The water supplies for the village, known as Llwyn-y-gog (or Llwynygog), were provided by damming of a nearby stream.

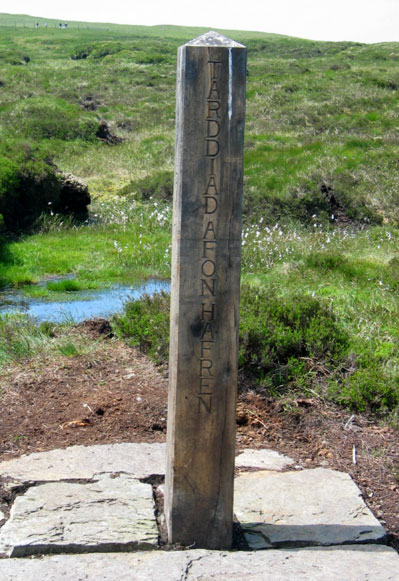
The source of the River Severn, near Hafren Forest

== Present day use ==
Although the forest still produces timber for Natural Resources Wales, it has also developed as a wildlife habitat and as a tourist attraction. The red kite is seen in the area, along with many other birds, plants and animals. There are numerous footpaths, and many bridleways that are popular for mountain biking and horse riding. Published walks include "The Source of The Severn", "Severn Breaks its Neck" and "The Blaenhafren Falls".

The Wye Valley Walk finishes at Rhyd y Benwch in the forest.

A quarry in the forest is used for "explosion studies" by Aberystwyth University's Combustion Physics Group. This quarry had previously been used by British Aerospace.

=== Motor sport ===
The forest is a popular location for many motocross and 4x4 championships and rally events.

The forest is regularly used as a stage on the Wales Rally GB. In January 2013 BBC Top Gear used a Bentley Continental driven by Kris Meeke to cover the stage.
