= Aust Ferry =

River crossing

Coordinates: 51°35′55.97″N 2°37′58.83″W

Aust / Beachley Ferry
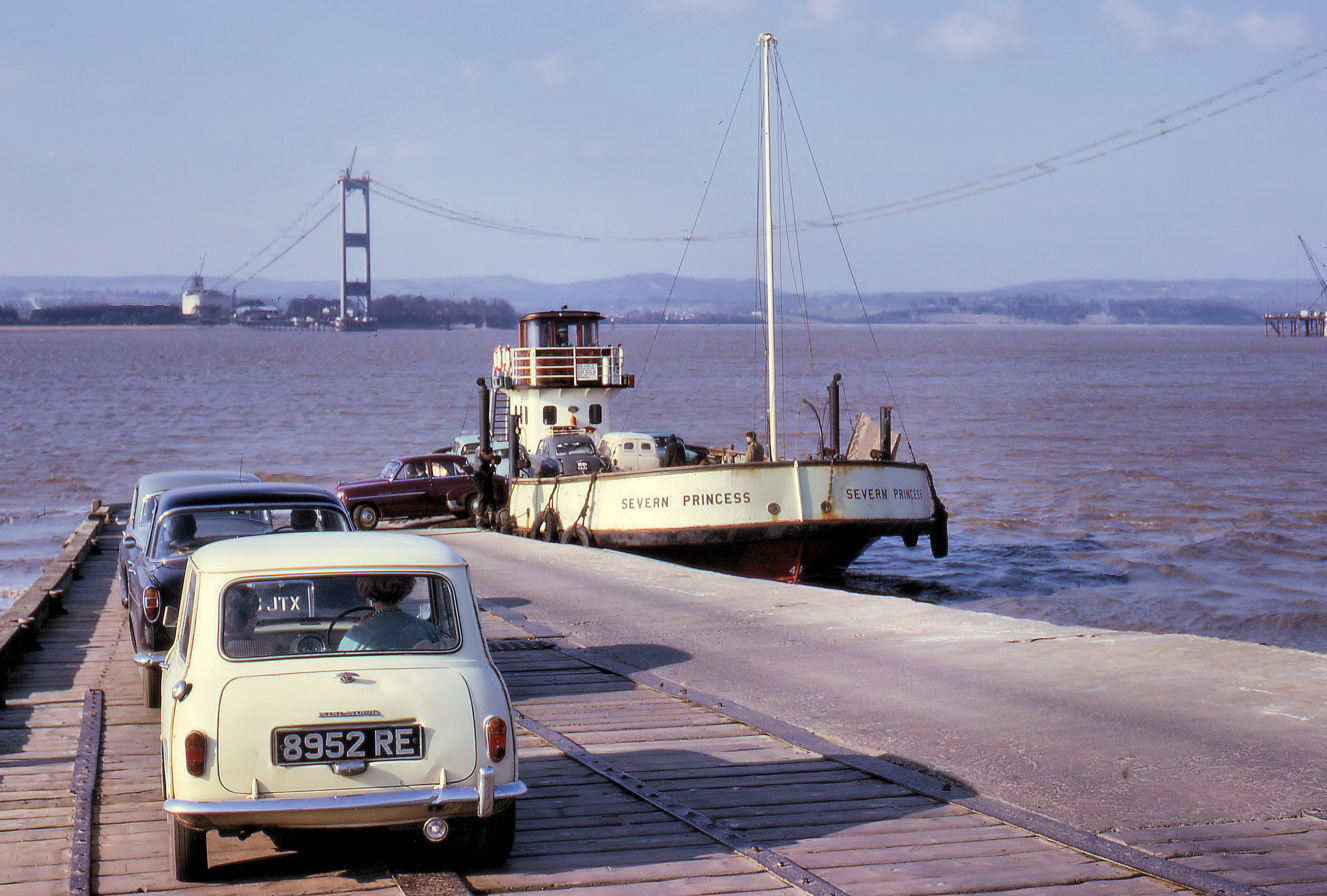
- The ferry at Aust in 1964. The Severn Bridge is under construction in the background
- Industry: Passenger and freight transport
- Founded: 1829; 197 years ago Car ferry 1926; 100 years ago
- Founder: Duke of Beaufort; Old Passage Ferry Association
- Defunct: 8 September 1966; 60 years ago
- Fate: Superseded by Severn Bridge
- Area served: River Severn

Aust Ferry or Beachley Ferry was a ferry service that operated across the River Severn between Aust and Beachley, both in Gloucestershire, England. Before the Severn Bridge opened in 1966, it provided service for road traffic crossing between the West Country and South Wales. The nearest fixed crossing was a 60-mile (97 km) round trip to Gloucester.

The ferry ran from a pier at Old Passage near the village of Aust on the east bank of the Severn. It ran to a similar pier on the east of the Beachley peninsula. The car ferry, set up in 1926, only carried cars, pedestrians and motorcycles; goods vehicles were prohibited from accessing the ferry terminal.

== History ==
There has been a passage across the Severn at this location since Roman Britain. It has been recorded as the site of the Trajectus (throwing-across) where the Roman legions used to be ferried across the Severn. It was recorded in the 12th century when the de Clares, lords of Tidenham, granted quittance of the passage to the monks of Tintern. It was evidently much used in 1405 when great numbers of the English and Welsh were said to resort to the nearby chapel of St. Twrog. The manor of Tidenham retained rights over the passage, and received rents from the parishes of Aust and Beachley, until the 19th century.

The journey, a distance of over a mile at a point where the tides run swiftly, was a dangerous one, and its reputation, the roughness of the water, and the smallness of the boats deterred travellers. Daniel Defoe visited the crossing from the Aust side in the 18th century, but did not trust the ferry to survive the bad weather, and elected to go via Gloucester instead. By that time, ferry crossings from New Passage, between Redwick near Pilning and Sudbrook on the Welsh side, rivalled the Aust passage, which became known as the Old Passage.

=== Steam ferries: 1827–1860 ===
In 1825 a new era opened with the formation of the Old Passage Ferry Association, sponsored by the Duke of Beaufort, as Lord of Tidenham. The company built stone piers on both banks, and commissioned a steamboat which began to ply in 1827, with a second one five years later, although sailing boats also continued to be used. By virtue of these improvements the company achieved the transfer of most of the cross-Severn mail routes from the rival New Passage. However, the passage remained dangerous. The Beachley-Aust ferry was lost with all hands on 1 September 1839. The same thing happened on 12 March 1844; the master, James Whitchurch was the son of the captain lost in 1839.

In 1863, the railway reached the downstream, New Passage shores on both sides of the river, and this became the standard route. The Old Passage, not connected to the railway, therefore lost much of its traffic. The advent of railways, in particular the opening of the Bristol and South Wales Union Railway in 1864, the Severn Railway Bridge in 1879 and then the Severn Tunnel in 1886, brought a sharp decrease in traffic. Both the steamboats were scrapped by 1860 and eventually the service was closed altogether.

=== Car ferry: 1926–1966 ===
Aust Ferry Terminal

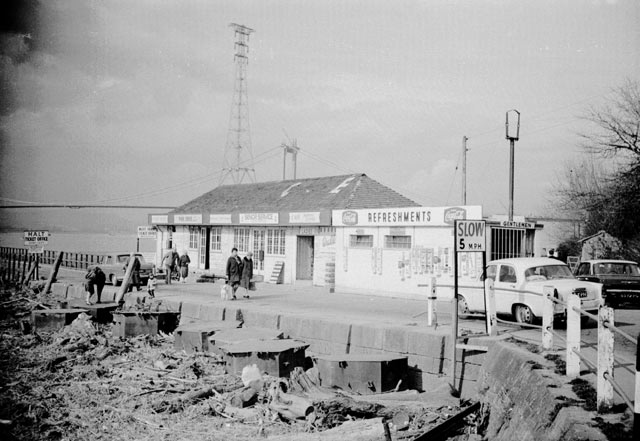
In use in 1966

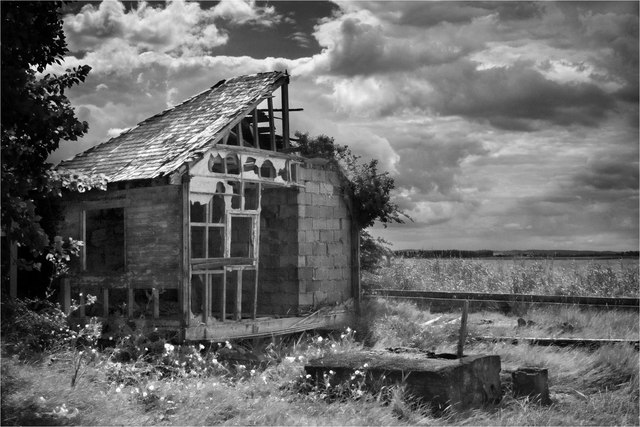
Dilapidated in 2006

The ferry service gained a new lease of life, however, with the growth of motor traffic, and a service was re-opened in 1926. Between 1931 and 1966, a ferry service was operated by Enoch Williams of the Old Passage Severn Ferry Company Ltd. Initially, this was only able to transport passengers with bicycles and motorbikes, but, by 1934, the Severn Queen was launched as a car ferry, with capacity for 17 cars. Each car had to turn sharply off the ramp onto the ferry, then be turned on a manually operated turntable before being parked. The process was reversed for unloading. The ferry timetable was affected by the huge tidal range on the Severn and it was unable to operate at low tide or at very high tides. There was also a reported engine breakdown where the ferry took two hours to repair whilst drifting down the Bristol Channel with the outward tide, and after the engine was repaired it took hours to return to Aust. The last ferry crossing occurred on 8 September 1966, the day before the first Severn Bridge opened.

Album cover showing Bob Dylan at Aust ferry terminal, 11 May 1966, by photographer Barry Feinstein

The Martin Scorsese film No Direction Home, about the life of Bob Dylan, uses the Barry Feinstein photograph of Dylan standing in front of the Aust ferry terminal in May 1966, not long before it ceased operation. Dylan was on his way from Bristol, where he had played at the Colston Hall, to Cardiff.

As late as 2007, several older road signs around central Bristol showed directions to "Aust Ferry", but with the word "ferry" painted out.

==== Vessels ====
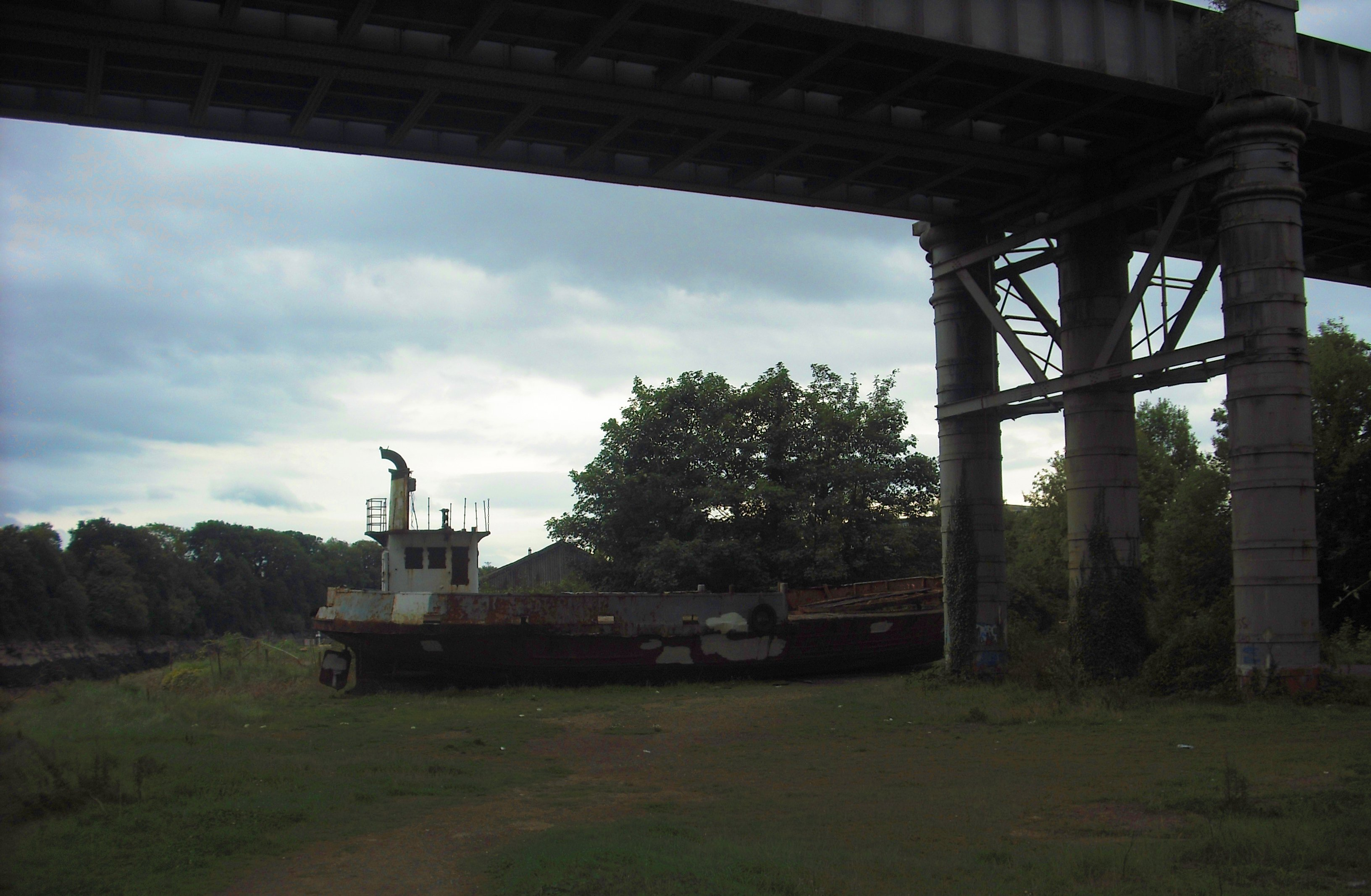
The Severn Princess derelict beneath the railway bridge at Chepstow, 2010

- MV May Queen (former Metropolitan Police launch). Re-opened passenger service 18 May 1931, with bicycles and motorcycles; lost in gale in January 1936.
- MV Princess Ida (built Chepstow, 1931). Wooden. In reserve from 1935, then requisitioned by the Admiralty as Birnbeck for experimental weapons work, and did not return.
- MV Severn Queen (built Woodward & Scarr, Beverley, 1934). Wheelhouse and funnel in centre of car deck. Withdrawn 1966 and scrapped in 1969.
- MV Severn King (built Woodward & Scarr, Beverley, 1935). Similar to the Severn Queen but wheelhouse elevated over car deck, originally a single funnel but twin side funnels a later addition. Withdrawn 1966 and converted in 1968 to a crane ship for British Rail. In 1970 was supporting the demolition of the damaged Severn Railway Bridge, when it collided with one of the bridge piers and was sunk.
- MV Severn Prince (built Yorkshire Dry Dock, Hull, 1959). Wheelhouse and funnel in centre of car deck. Withdrawn 1966 and sold in 1969.

== MV Severn Princess restoration ==
The last remaining ferry boat, the Severn Princess which was launched in 1959, was found wrecked, abandoned and full of fertiliser in Ireland in 1999 by Dr. Richard Jones, the grandson of Enoch Williams. As Galway County Council had put a demolition order on the vessel, a small group of Chepstow residents formed the Severn Princess Restoration Group with an urgent remit to save the Severn Princess and return her to the town.

The derelict vessel was purchased for a token one guinea and temporary repair work started to get the vessel to a state where it could be towed back to South Wales. The Severn Princess returned to Beachley in 2003 following a five-day tow. For some years the vessel rested alongside the Beachley slipway, but was eventually moved to the west bank of the River Wye in Chepstow, to sit beneath the railway bridge. After some years of delay, during which the condition of the vessel deteriorated further, restoration finally started in 2014.

The first stage of the restoration was made possible with the pledge and realisation of support from Chepstow-based steel bridging and infrastructure manufacturer Mabey Bridge Ltd which, as part of its Bridging Time community support programme, donated time, equipment and paint to enable the stabilisation of the vessel and arrest further deterioration. Mabey Bridge apprentices along with other employees of the company removed the turntable, winch and wheel capstan from the ferry and relocated them to the Mabey Bridge manufacturing facility for refurbishment. The majority of spray guards were similarly removed and relocated. However, some have been left as a template for future rebuilding. Holes were also drilled in the lower hull to drain the ferry of rainwater and Mabey Bridge staff secured the cabins. The winch chain hull tears were sent to be plated.

This first phase of restoration was completed Thursday 11 September 2014 and commemorated with a handover ceremony attended by the Mayor of Chepstow Cllr Ned Heywood, members of the Severn Princess Restoration Group, and management and apprentices from Mabey Bridge Ltd. The long-term aim of the Severn Princess Restoration Group is to return the vessel to a state where it can sit as a permanent heritage display at the site. The group has begun the process of clearing the area under the Brunel (tubular) railway bridge to make the site more attractive to visitors and users of the Wales Coast Path, which runs through Chepstow. Practical Boat Owner magazine reported on the project in 2021 as an example of a restoration project which has stalled, writing "there is no longer a Severn Princess Restoration Group website and the fascinating Wikipedia page hasn't been updated since the 2014 collaboration with the bridge-building firm Mabey Bridge in Chepstow. That's not to say the Severn Princess will never be restored, but her future must certainly be in doubt". The restoration efforts were further impeded by the loss of a number of fixtures and fittings following a theft in March 2023.

== See also ==
- Crossings of the River Severn

== Sources ==
- Jordan, Christopher (1977). Severn Enterprise. Arthur H Stockwell. ISBN 0-7223-0967-8.
- Langley, Martin (1984). Estuary & River Ferries of South West England. Waine Research Publications. ISBN 0-905184-08-4.
