= Severn Bridge =

Bridge over the rivers Severn and Wye in England and Wales

Severn Bridge Pont Hafren (Welsh)
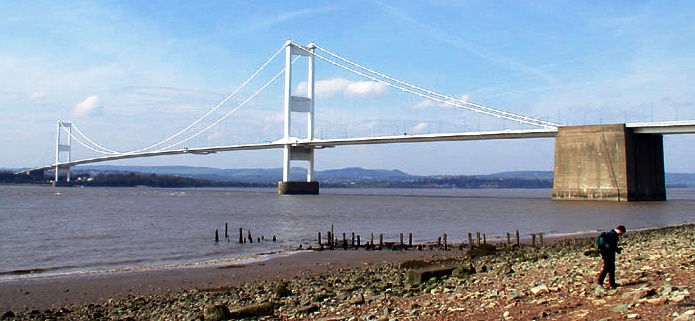
- The Severn Bridge seen from Aust Beach, England
- Coordinates: 51°36′33″N 02°38′18″W
- Carries: M48 motorway (4 lanes); National Cycle Route 4 (shared cycle path and footway)
- Crosses: River Severn; River Wye
- Locale: South West England / South East Wales
- Maintained by: National Highways
- Heritage status: Grade I listed

Characteristics
- Design: Suspension bridge
- Total length: 0.99 mi (1.6 km)
- Height: 445 ft (136 m)
- Longest span: 3,240 ft (988 m)
- Clearance below: 154 ft (47 m)

History
- Architect: Freeman Fox and Partners in association with Mott, Hay and Anderson, consulting architect Sir Percy Thomas
- Constructed by: John Howard & Co., Sir William Arrol & Co., Cleveland Bridge & Engineering Company and Dorman Long
- Opened: 8 September 1966; 60 years ago

Statistics
- Daily traffic: Between 17,155 and 17,828 (2003–2008)
- Toll: Free

Location
- Interactive map of Severn Bridge

The Severn Bridge (Welsh: Pont Hafren) is a motorway suspension bridge that spans the River Severn between South Gloucestershire in England and Monmouthshire in South East Wales. It is the original Severn road crossing between England and Wales, and took three and a half years to build, at a cost of £8 million. It replaced the 137-year-old Aust Ferry.

The bridge was opened in 1966 by Queen Elizabeth II. For thirty years, the bridge carried the M4 motorway. It was granted Grade I listed status in 1999.

Following the completion of the Prince of Wales Bridge, the section of motorway from Olveston in England to Magor in Wales was designated the M48.

In addition to carrying the motorway, the bridge has service paths on each side which are open to pedestrians and cyclists. These carry National Cycle Route 4 and EuroVelo cycle routes, as well as hosting a weekly parkrun.

== History ==
Construction of the Severn Bridge
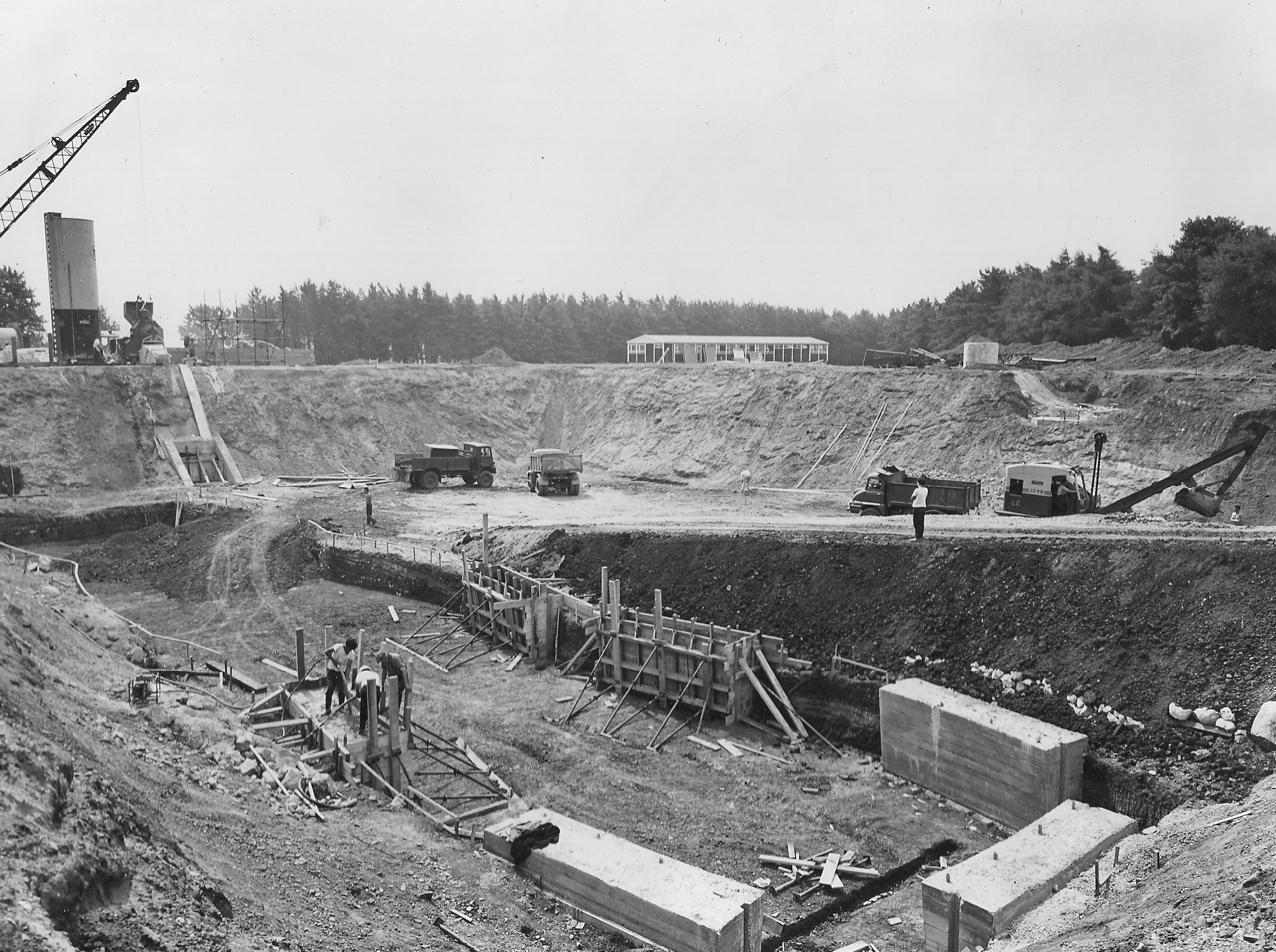
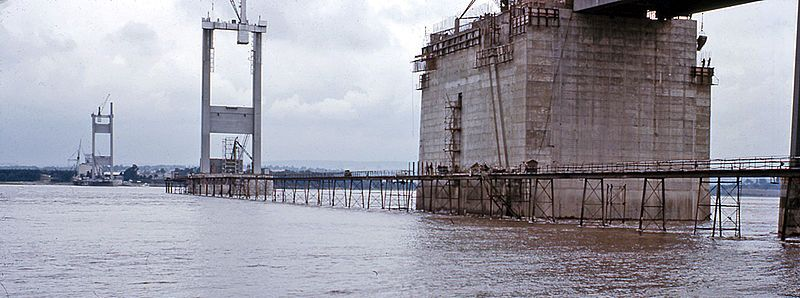
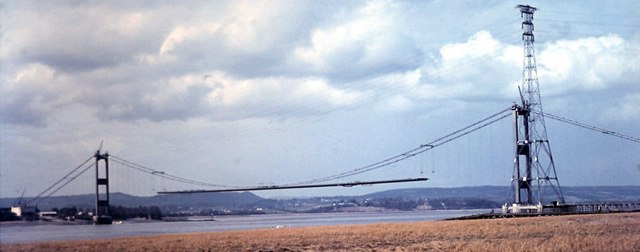

The first proposal for a bridge across the Severn, approximately in the same location as that eventually constructed, was in 1824 by Thomas Telford, who had been asked to advise on how to improve mail coach services between London and Wales. No action was taken, and over the next few decades the railways became the dominant mode of long-distance travel, with the Severn Railway Bridge at Sharpness being opened in 1879 and the main line Severn Tunnel in 1886.

The growth of road traffic in the early 20th century led to further calls for improvements, and in the early 1920s Chepstow Urban District Council convened a meeting of neighbouring local authorities to consider a Severn crossing to ease congestion and delays on the A48 passing through the town. In 1935 Gloucestershire County Council and Monmouthshire County Council jointly promoted a parliamentary bill to obtain powers to build the bridge over the estuary, with 75% of costs to be met by the Ministry of Transport from the Road Fund. The bill was rejected by Parliament after opposition from the Great Western Railway Company.

After the Second World War, plans began to be made for a nationally funded network of trunk roads, including a Severn Bridge, for which the contract was awarded to Mott, Hay and Anderson, with Freeman Fox and Partners. The public inquiry into the scheme was held on 24 September 1946 at Bristol University. Because Government funding was prioritised for the similar Forth Road Bridge (opened in 1964), construction of the Severn Bridge was not started until 1961: the UK government announced in 1962 that construction costs would be recovered by a toll of 2s 6d (£0.125) on all vehicle crossings, though walking or cycling across the bridge would be charge-free. The substructure was completed by contractors John Howard and Co in 1963. The superstructure contract was awarded to Associated Bridge Builders Ltd (a joint venture of Sir William Arrol & Co., Cleveland Bridge & Engineering Company and Dorman Long) in 1963, and completed in 1966.

The bridge was officially opened by Queen Elizabeth II on 8 September 1966. Tolls were initially half a crown (12½p).

The bridge has been featured in several promotions.

In January 1977, it was announced that bridge traffic would be restricted to a single lane in each direction following the discovery of several weaknesses in the ten-year-old structure. The lane closures would last for several months.

The Severn Bridge crossing was strengthened and resurfaced in the late 1980s as the weight of traffic grew. The work included the strengthening of the Severn Bridge towers and deck, an extension to the Wye Bridge towers and the replacement of the original single stays with two stays. The open structure of the new stays is designed to facilitate maintenance. Most of the strengthening work was inside the deck box and towers and so is not visible. Design of the strengthening was by Flint & Neill. The surfacing is a 35 mm (1 3/8 in) thick layer of mastic asphalt over an acrylic waterproofing membrane.

During its 40th year of operation in 2006, the bridge was inspected to check for corrosion of the suspension cables. According to the Highways Agency, the inspection concluded that the bridge needed restrictions on heavy goods vehicles. Such vehicles were subsequently restricted to one lane on the bridge, with weight restriction signs in place. A system of rubber casing on the cables with dry air circulation, as used on the Forth Road Bridge, was installed in 2007–2009 in a move to halt the progress of the corrosion.

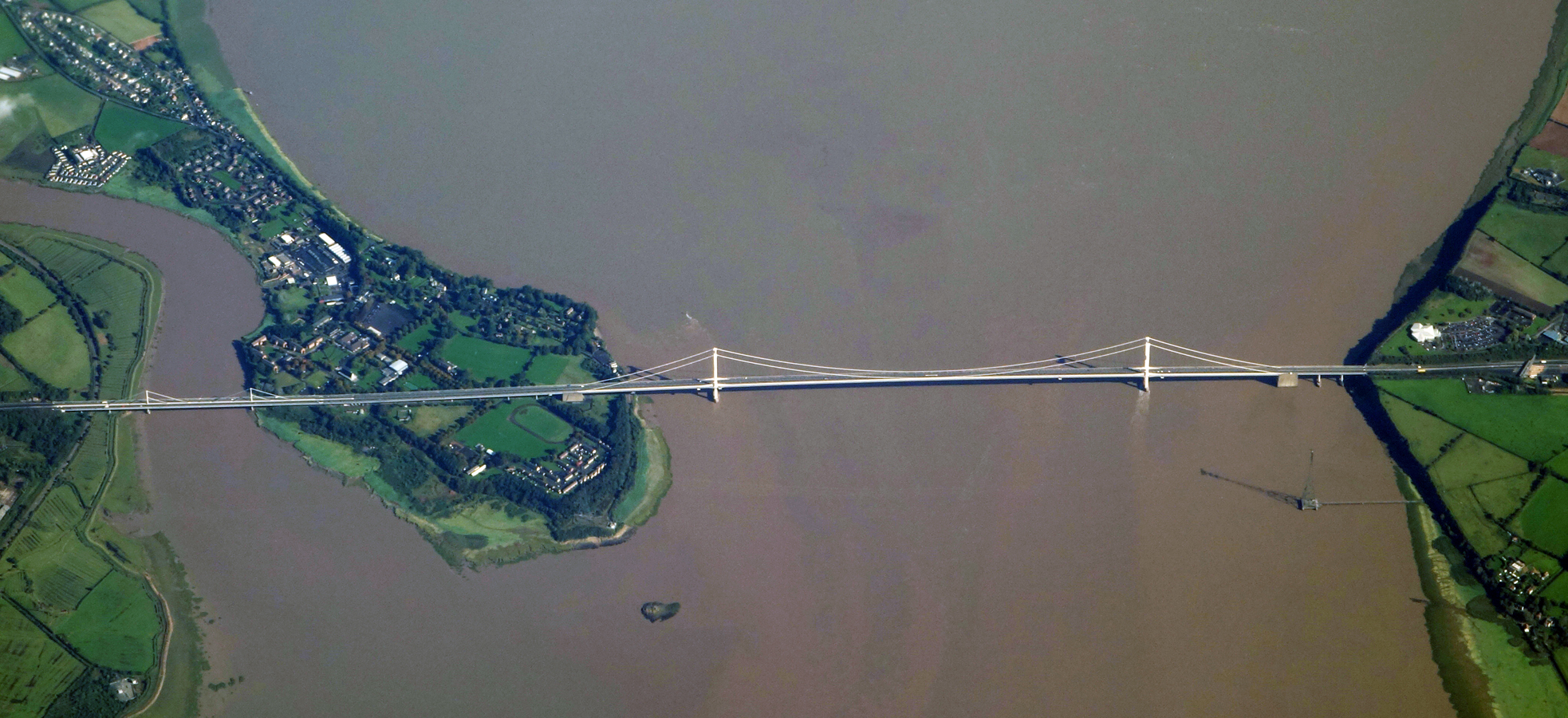
From left to right: Wye Bridge, Beachley Viaduct, Severn Bridge and Aust Viaduct
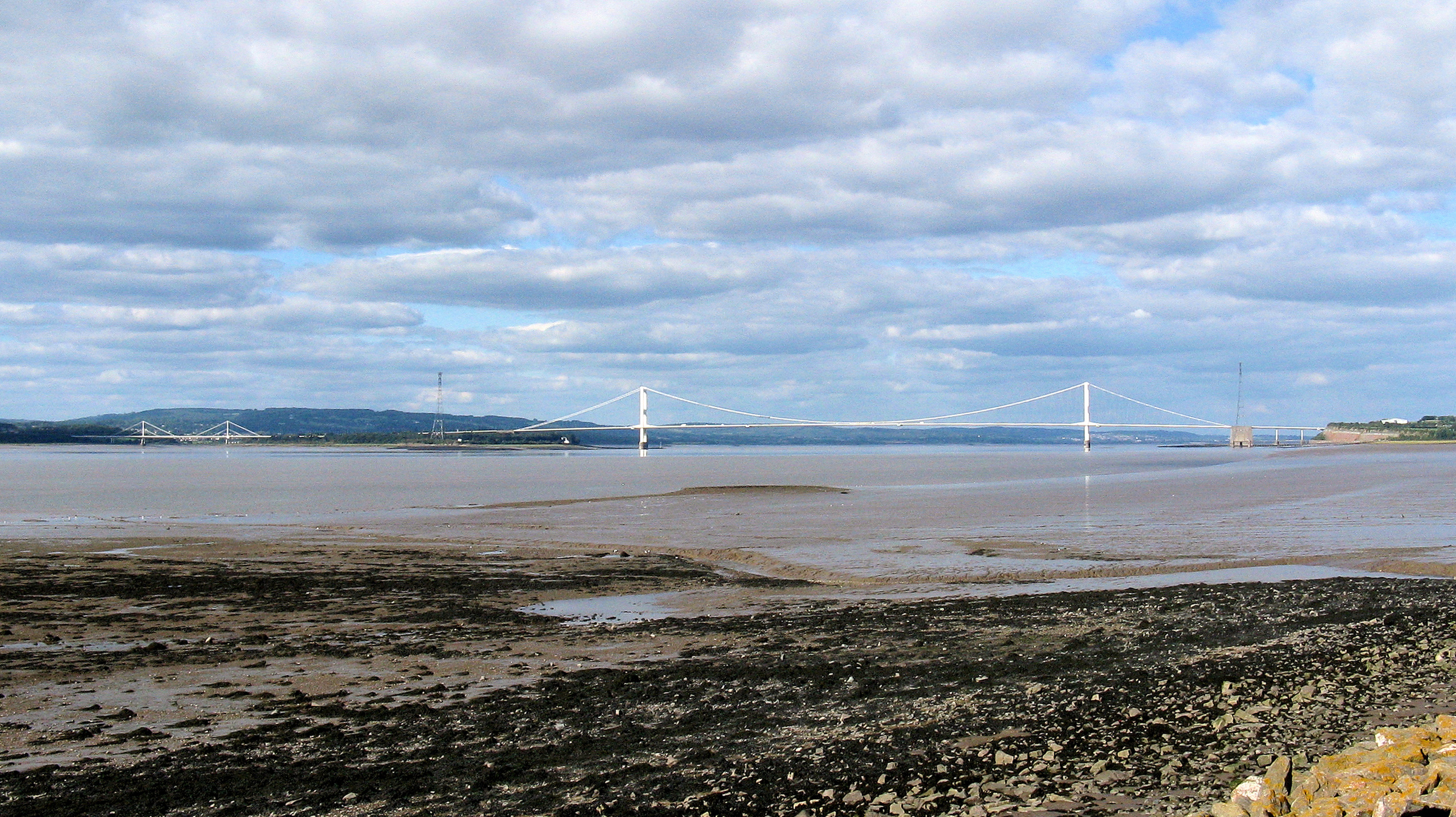
Wye bridge (left) and Severn bridge (right), seen from the southwest

In October 2021, the Welsh Government announced it was considering reclassifying the M48 into an A-road in view of the reduced amount of traffic on the bridge and M48 following the opening of the Prince of Wales bridge, and the high cost to improve the M48 to motorway standards. Reclassification requires approval from both the Welsh Government and Secretary of State for Wales, with the Department for Transport stating they have no plans to reclassify the M48 in England.

In May 2025, after laboratory tests of corroded cable strands found some had less strength than expected, most HGV traffic over 7.5 tonnes (8.3 short tons) was banned from the crossing for a trial period of 18 months. According to National Highways, "the medium-term solution aims to lift the 7.5T restriction by combining technology and traffic management tools (like signs, barriers or signals) [...] these will ensure vehicle loads remain within safe limits at all times."

== Construction ==
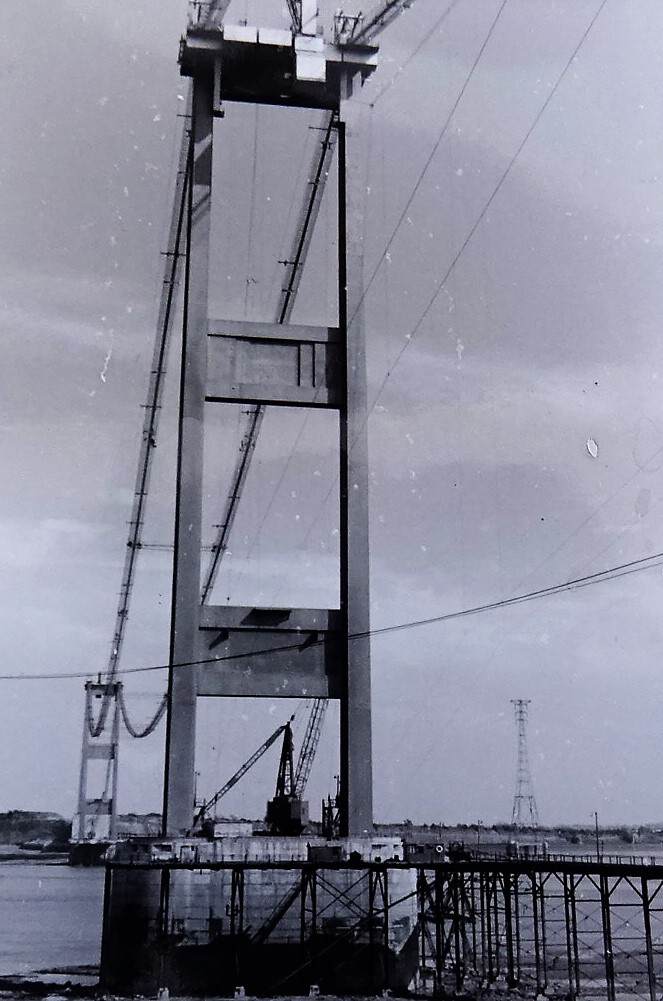
Construction in 1964

Construction started in May 1961; construction of the superstructure started 12 months later. At the time, there was also discussion in Liverpool of a similar suspension bridge over the River Mersey. The first construction equipment arrived on the banks of the Severn on Monday 17 April 1961, at Beachley and Aust. Equipment of John Howard Ltd would arrive by train at Chepstow railway station, from the Forth Road Bridge site. The same equipment for making the cables on the Forth Road Bridge was brought down to the Severn site.

The bridge parapet, with two miles of railing and 1,200 steel safety barrier posts, was built by Bayliss Jones & Bayliss (BJB), part of GKN, of Cable Street, Wolverhampton. Bayliss Jones also built the parapet for the M2 Medway Viaduct, and the M1 Tinsley Viaduct.

Zinc wire was manufactured by Charles Clifford Ltd of Dogpool Mills in Stirchley, Birmingham, for protection of steel fabrications. In November 1962, Dorman Long of Middlesbrough received an order for 4,200 tons of galvanised high-tensile steel wire, of 0.196 inches in diameter. The first cables were constructed in late October 1963. A walkway across the towers was established by January 1964. The main construction of the cable across the Severn began in mid-February 1964. The cables were floodlit in March 1964. Ernest Marples, Minister of Transport, walked across the cable structure from Gloucestershire to Monmouthshire, on Monday 22 June 1964. The cables were complete on Thursday 9 July 1964. It had taken four months, with fifty workmen.

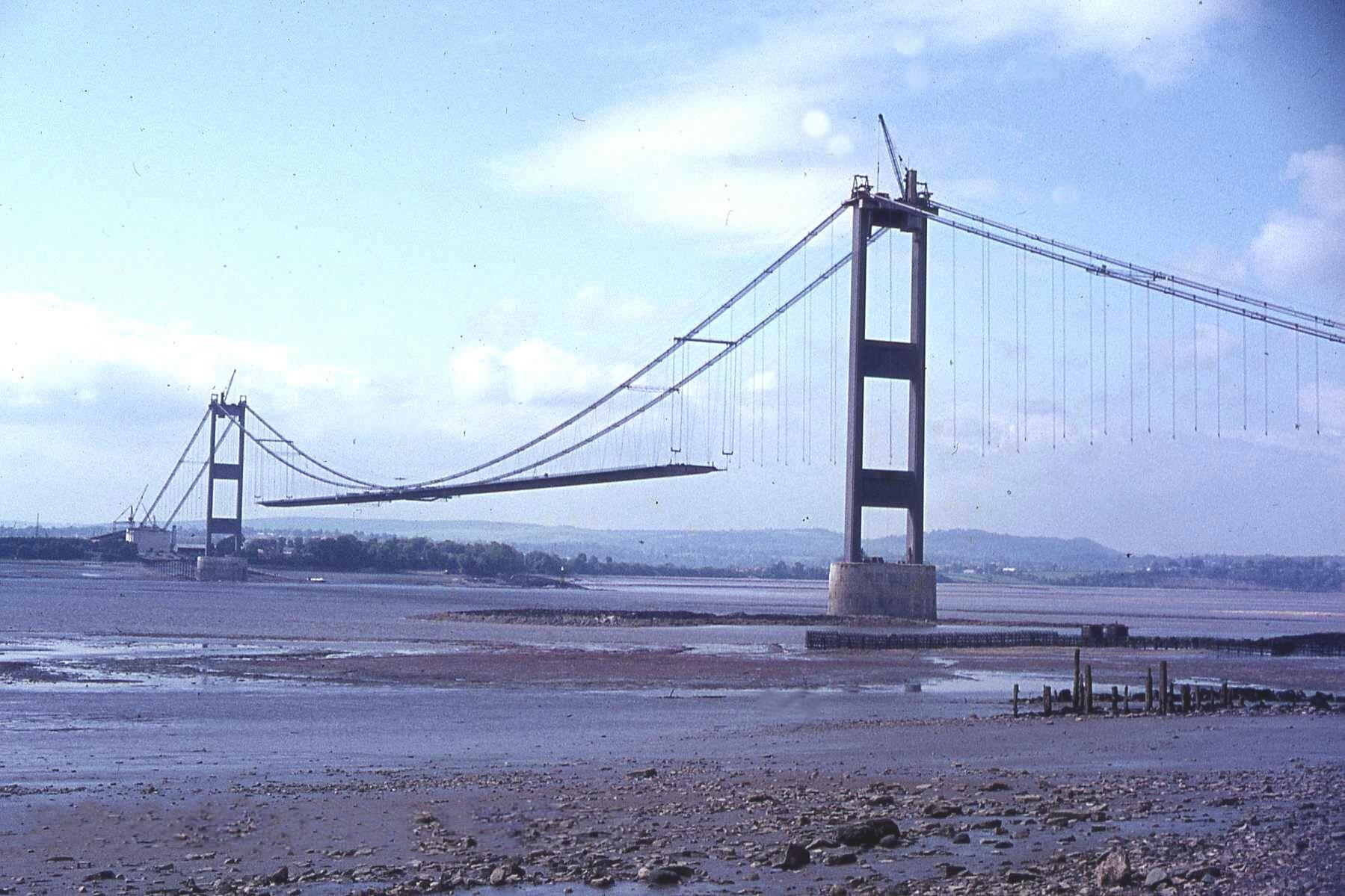
The deck being built on 15 May 1965

The first 130-ton road section was lifted into place on Tuesday 27 October 1964, on the 'Severn Knave' barge. There were four barges, Severn Queen, Severn King, Severn Knave and Severn Princess. It was the first time that bridge sections had been floated in the river, and lifted. There were 88 road sections. The final section was lifted into place on Monday 19 July 1965.

In May 1966, while on his way to Cardiff, Bob Dylan was photographed waiting for Aust ferry with the almost-finished bridge visible in the background behind him. Shortly after, the bridge was officially opened on 8 September 1966 by Queen Elizabeth II.

For the Gloucestershire M4 approach road, a contract of £2,374,140 was given to Costain in August 1963, for four miles of dual carriageway. For the Monmouthshire M4 approach road, a contract of £1,677,564 was given to Martin Cowley Ltd of Clay Cross in Derbyshire, in March 1964, for four miles of dual carriageway.

Construction of the Wye Bridge started in June 1963.

== Component structures ==
The Severn Bridge crossing consists of four structures, which, in order from England to Wales, are: the Aust Viaduct, Severn Bridge, Beachley Viaduct and Wye Bridge. In 1998 the Severn Bridge and Aust Viaduct were given Grade I listed status, and the Beachley Viaduct (eastern/English end) of the Wye Bridge and the western/Welsh end of the Wye Bridge received Grade II listed status.

=== Aust Viaduct ===
The 514 ft (157 m) Aust Viaduct is a twin box girder structure with a concrete deck, which carries the roadway from the top of Aust Cliff to the first gravity anchorage of the old Severn Bridge. The roadway is then carried over the top of the concrete anchorage to the Severn Bridge.

=== Severn Bridge ===
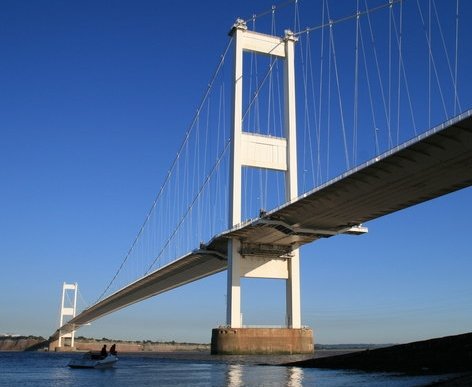
The Severn Bridge

The Severn Bridge is close to the former Aust Ferry. The bridge is a suspension bridge of conventional design, with the deck supported by two main cables slung between two steel towers. In 1966 the cables supporting the bridge deck were spun from 18,000 miles (29,000 km) of wire. The main cables are each made up of 8,322 individual 5 mm (3/16 in) wires. An unusual feature of the suspension cables carrying the deck is that they are not vertical, as for most suspension bridges, but rather arranged in a zig-zag fashion, with adjacent mounts closely spaced. The triangulation this offers is a measure to reduce vibration, as is the use of Stockbridge dampers on the cables. The bridge is 5,240 ft (1,600 m) long, consisting of a 3,240 ft (988 m) central span between the towers and the two 1,000 ft (305 m) side spans. The towers rise to 445 ft (136 m) above mean high water and are of hollow box construction. The deck is an orthotropic steel box girder of aerofoil shape with cantilevered cycle tracks and footway supported from the box. The shape of the bridge was determined by the designers Freeman, Fox and Partners following wind tunnel tests for the Forth Road Bridge, after the original wind tunnel model was accidentally destroyed. The sections of the deck were built at Fairfield-Mabey in Chepstow, and each 132 tonne section was then floated down the river before being hoisted into position.

=== Beachley Viaduct ===
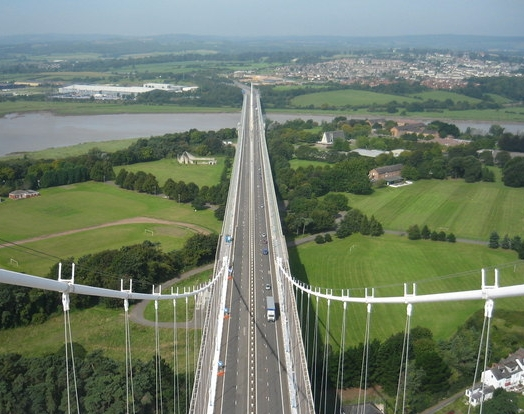
Beachley Viaduct stretching over Beachley Barracks. The Wye Bridge is in the background.

The 2,444 ft (745 m) Beachley Viaduct is of a box girder construction similar to that of the Severn Bridge but is supported on steel trestles as it crosses the Beachley peninsula over the British Army camp, Beachley Barracks, that is home to 1st Battalion, The Rifles. In November 2016 the Ministry of Defence announced that the site would close in 2027, later extending the date to 2031.

=== Wye Bridge ===
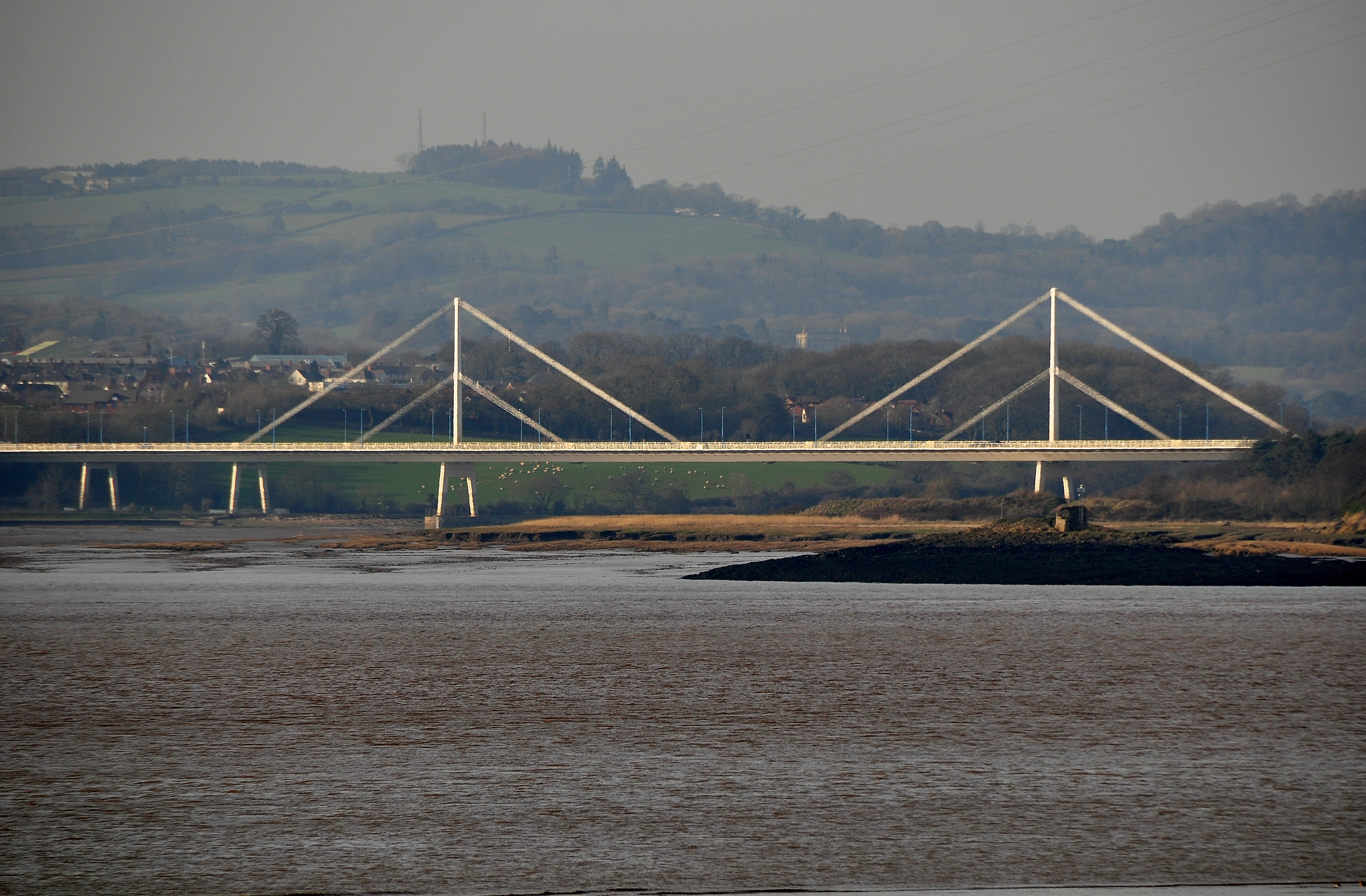
The Wye Bridge

The Wye Bridge (Welsh: Pont Gwy) is a 1,340 ft (408 m) long cable-stayed bridge, which crosses the border marked by the River Wye between England and Wales, 2 miles (3.2 km) south of Chepstow. It consists of a single large cable stayed section with two single-leg pylons supporting the bridge deck from the centre of the roadway. The deck is an orthotropic box girder similar to the Severn Bridge but has a different appearance as it has two sets of cable stays on each of two towers. Originally there was only one set of cable stays but these were replaced during the strengthening works. The Wye Bridge was built by Cleveland Bridge & Engineering Company.

== Tolls ==
The toll was collected on the English side, but only for vehicles travelling westwards from England to Wales. This led some people to describe it as a "tax on entering Wales", both in jest and also as a more serious anti-toll campaign. Originally, tolls were charged in both directions, but the arrangements were changed in the early 1990s to eliminate the need for a set of toll booths for each direction of travel and the potential for traffic waiting to pay the toll backing up onto the bridge itself.

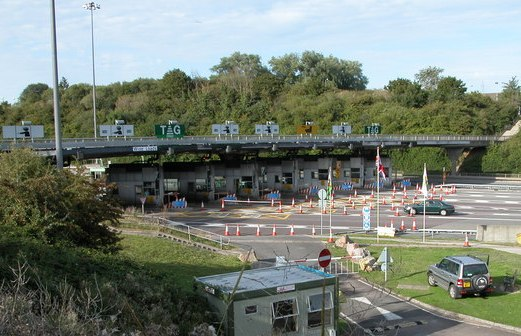
The westbound carriageway toll collection area, later demolished, on the M48 motorway, shown in 2006

Shortly after the opening of the Severn Bridge, Welsh poet Harri Webb wrote an Ode on the Severn Bridge:

Two lands at last connected
Across the waters wide
And all the tolls collected
On the English side

In 1966, the toll for using the new motorway crossing was set at 2s 6d (post-decimalisation equivalent £0.125) for all vehicles apart from solo motorcycles which enjoyed a reduced toll of 1s (£0.05). For a small car the bridge toll represented a saving of 7s (£0.35) on the price of the ferry crossing, at that time 9s 6d (£0.475). By 1989, the toll had reached £2 each way for goods vehicles with an unladen weight over 1,525 kg (3,362 lb) and passenger vehicles adapted to carry more than 16 passengers, and £1 each way for other vehicles. If the Severn toll had increased in line with general inflation since September 1966, when Queen Elizabeth II opened the bridge, the original value of £0.125 would have reached £2.19 in each direction (or £4.38 as it was just a one-way toll) as of 2016.

In the 2016 United Kingdom budget George Osborne, the Chancellor of the Exchequer, announced that toll charges on the Severn crossings would be halved in 2018. The Welsh Liberal Democrats leader Kirsty Williams called the cut "pathetic" and said, "The Chancellor is cynically acting as if he is doing commuters a favour, but the fact is that he wants to keep this unfair tax on entering Wales." The toll was due to be cut to £5.40 in 2017 but actually increased further.

In July 2017, the Welsh Secretary, Alun Cairns, announced that tolls would be abolished by the end of 2018, claiming that this would boost the South Wales economy by around £100m a year. In September 2017, Cairns confirmed that tolls would be reduced in January 2018 when VAT is removed. In October 2018 he said that the Severn Bridge tolls would cease on 17 December 2018.

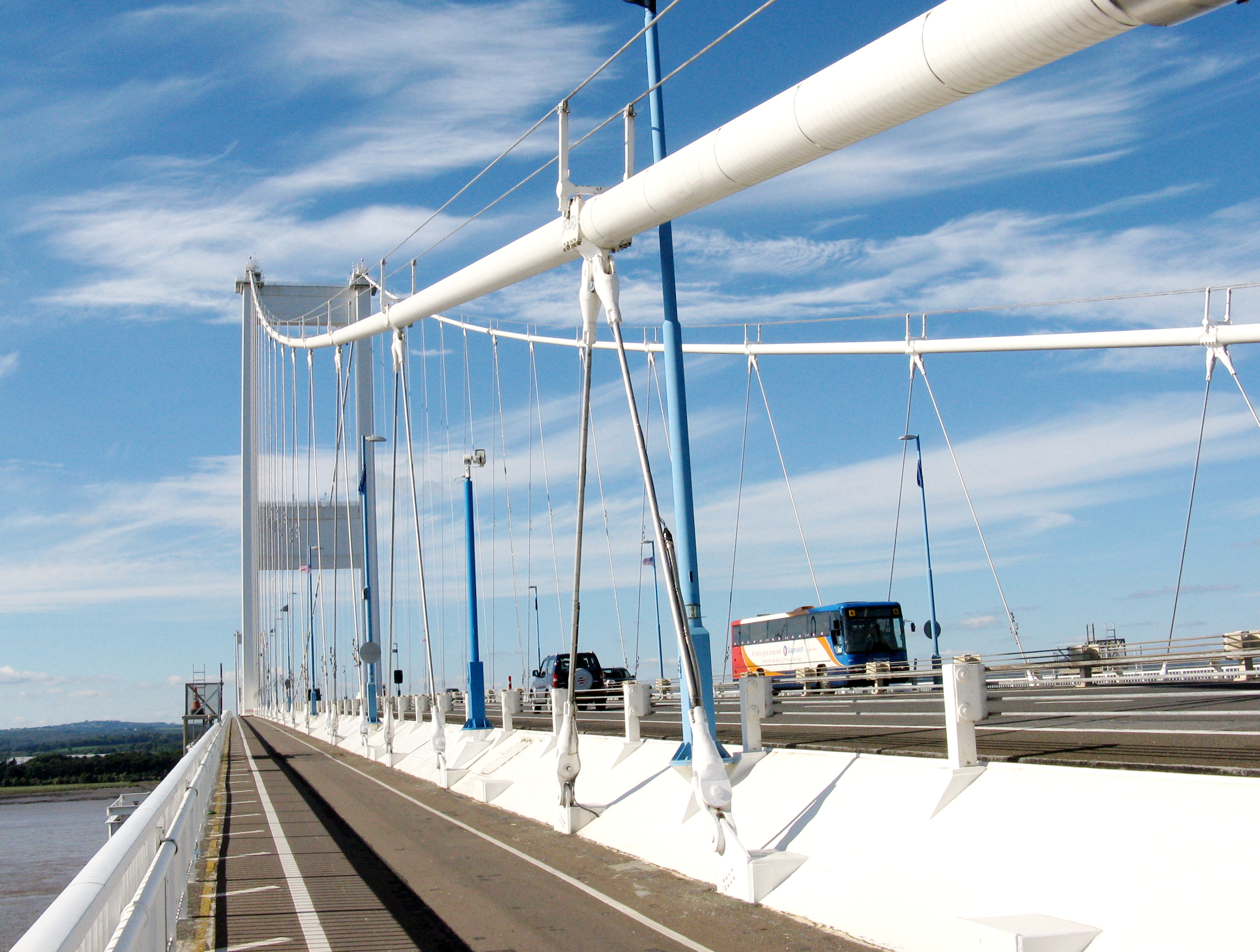
On the bridge walkway, looking towards Wales

On 17 December 2018, all toll lanes were permanently closed, officially marking the start of a toll-free journey into Wales for the first time since the bridge's construction. During the removal process of the toll booths, traffic was directed through a temporary three-lane layout, directly through the centre of the former toll lanes. These lanes were narrower than usual, resulting in a 50 mph speed limit being enforced. On 25 March 2019, a newly resurfaced road structure was opened, moving traffic flow from the centre of the former toll lanes to the right-hand side, directly next to eastbound traffic. This allowed for further work to remove any remaining toll infrastructure to the left of the new road layout.

=== History of charges ===
The Severn Estuary the Severn Bridge and the Second Severn Crossing

Category 1: passenger vehicles up to 9 seats
Category 2: commercial vehicles up to 3,500 kg and buses up to 17 seats
Category 3: commercial vehicles over 3,500 kg

| Category | 1 | 2 | 3 |
|---|---|---|---|
| 26 April – 31 December 1992 | £2.80 | £5.60 | £8.40 |
| 1 January – 31 December 1993 | £3.10 | £6.20 | £9.30 |
| 1 January – 31 December 1994 | £3.40 | £6.80 | £10.10 |
| 1 January – 31 December 1995 | £3.70 | £7.40 | £11.10 |
| 1 January – 31 December 1996 | £3.80 | £7.70 | £11.50 |
| 1 January – 31 December 1997 | £3.90 | £7.80 | £11.70 |
| 1 January – 31 December 1998 | £4.00 | £8.10 | £12.10 |
| 1 January – 31 December 1999 | £4.20 | £8.40 | £12.50 |
| 1 January – 31 December 2000 | £4.20 | £8.50 | £12.70 |
| 1 January – 31 December 2001 | £4.40 | £8.70 | £13.10 |
| 1 January – 31 December 2002 | £4.40 | £8.90 | £13.30 |
| 1 January – 31 December 2003 | £4.50 | £9.00 | £13.50 |
| 1 January – 31 December 2004 | £4.60 | £9.30 | £13.90 |
| 1 January – 31 December 2005 | £4.80 | £9.60 | £14.30 |
| 1 January – 31 December 2006 | £4.90 | £9.80 | £14.70 |
| 1 January – 31 December 2007 | £5.10 | £10.20 | £15.30 |
| 1 January – 31 December 2008 | £5.30 | £10.60 | £15.90 |
| 1 January – 31 December 2009 | £5.40 | £10.90 | £16.30 |
| 1 January – 31 December 2010 | £5.50 | £10.90 | £16.40 |
| 1 January – 31 December 2011 | £5.70 | £11.50 | £17.20 |
| 1 January – 31 December 2012 | £6.00 | £12.10 | £18.10 |
| 1 January – 31 December 2013 | £6.20 | £12.40 | £18.60 |
| 1 January – 31 December 2014 | £6.40 | £12.80 | £19.20 |
| 1 January – 31 December 2015 | £6.50 | £13.10 | £19.60 |
| 1 January – 31 December 2016 | £6.60 | £13.20 | £19.80 |
| 1 January 2017 – 7 January 2018 | £6.70 | £13.40 | £20.00 |
| 8 January – 16 December 2018 | £5.60 | £11.20 | £16.70 |
| 17 December 2018 – present | Free | | |

== Ownership ==
Ownership and operation of the bridge passed to Severn River Crossing plc on 26 April 1992 as part of the deal to build the Second Severn Crossing.

In November 2010, Severn River Crossing plc was owned

- 35% John Laing, British developer infrastructure operator
- 35% Vinci, French concessions and construction company
- 15% Bank of America, American multinational banking and financial services corporation
- 15% Barclays Capital, British multinational investment bank

The company's 2011 annual report showed the same companies still owned, through subsidiary companies, all the issued ordinary share capital of the Plc.

Ownership of the bridge and the Second Severn Crossing returned to the UK government on 8 January 2018 when the revenue required to build and maintain them, as defined in a Concession Agreement with the Secretary of State for Transport, had been collected. In 2010, the concession was expected to end in 2017. In 2012, changes were made to the agreement to reflect the effect of changes in VAT and Corporation Tax and the costs of installing credit card handling systems. The net effect was to increase the required revenue from £995.83 million to £1,028.91 million in 1989 prices.

== Monuments and plaques ==
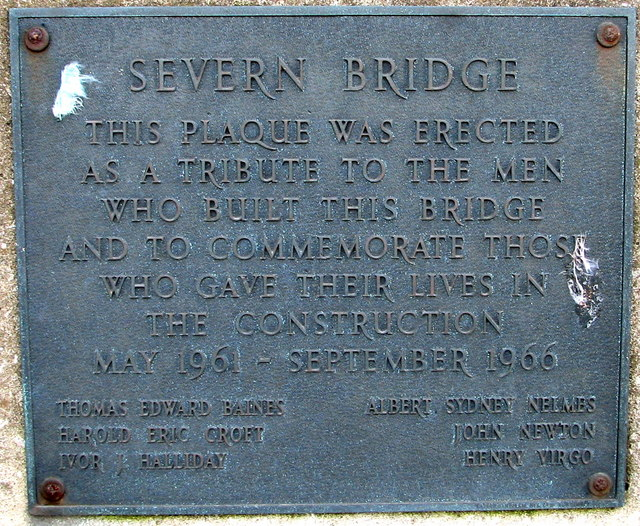
Plaque to commemorate the men who lost their lives in building the bridge

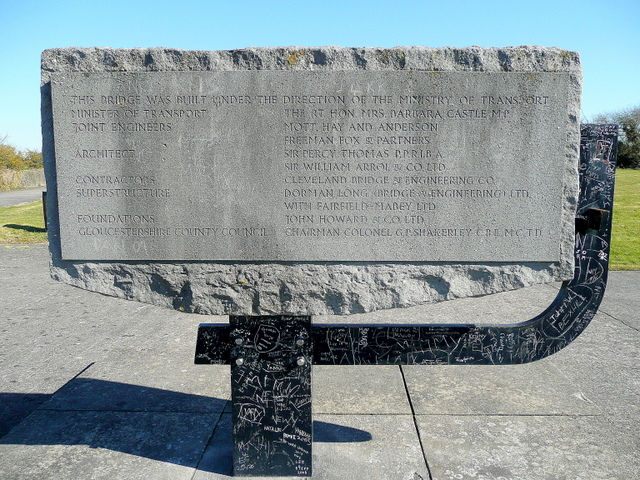
Monument showing the architects and constructors etc. of the bridge

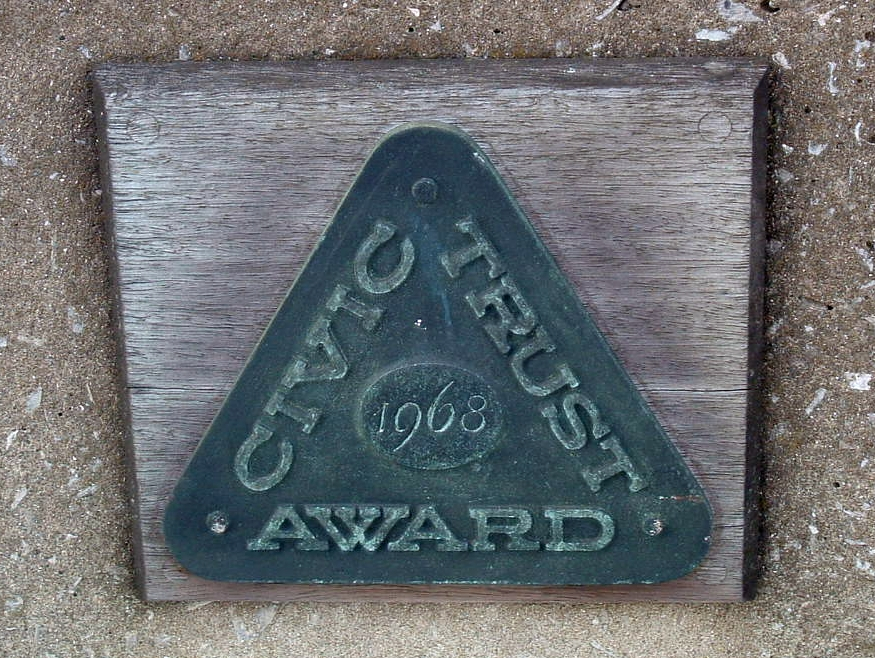
The bridge won a Civic Trust Award in 1968.

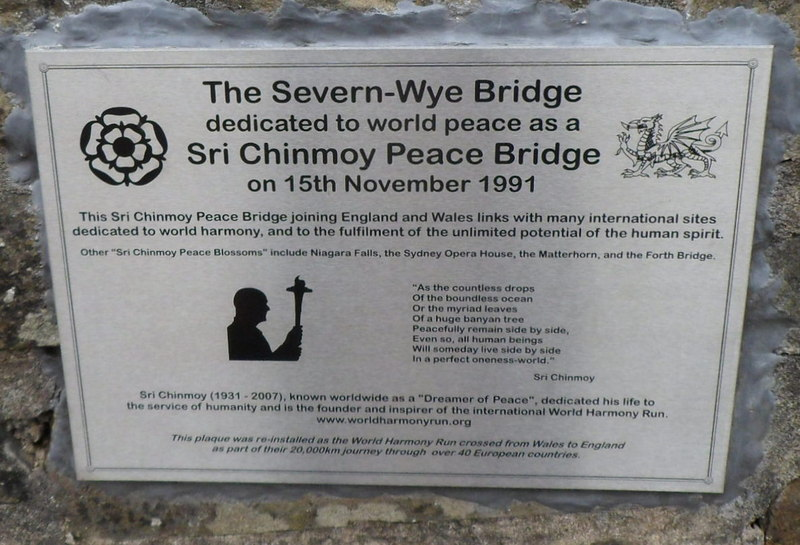
The bridge was dedicated to peace as part of the Sri Chinmoy Peace-Blossoms programme in 1991.

== Bridge status ==
On 6 February 2009, during a week of snowfall throughout Britain, both Severn bridges were closed simultaneously due to ice falling from the bridge structure and damaging vehicles. On 22 December 2009, both bridges were closed again for the same reason.

A privately developed app called Enviroute provides the status of both bridges. The original Severn Bridge status website, www.severnbridge.co.uk, was decommissioned in December 2018 following the removal of the tolls and the handing back of the first bridge to the UK government.

== See also ==
- List of crossings of the River Severn
- List of crossings of the River Wye
- List of international bridges
- Aust Severn Powerline Crossing
