= West End (Caldicot ward) =

Coordinates: 51.586°N 2.759°W

- Electoral ward
- Location within Monmouthshire
- Population: 1,944 (2011 census)
- Community: Caldicot
- Principal area: Monmouthshire
- Country: Wales
- Sovereign state: United Kingdom
- UK Parliament: Newport East
- Senedd Cymru – Welsh Parliament: Newport East
- Councillors: 1 (County), 3 (Town)

West End is an electoral ward in the town of Caldicot, Monmouthshire, Wales. The ward elects councillors to Caldicot Town Council and Monmouthshire County Council.

== Description ==
The West End ward covers the western corner of the Caldicot community, bordered more-or-less by the B4245 Newport Road and Caldicot by-pass. The ward stretches south to the River Severn. To the west is the community/ward of Rogiet. The West End ward includes Caldicot railway station.

According to the 2001 UK Census the population of the West End ward was 1,918, increasing slightly to 1,944 by the 2011 UK Census.

In 2014 plans for 82 new houses on 12 acres of neglected brownfield land next to the mainline railway were rejected by the County Council planning committee.

== Town Council elections ==
Castle is a community ward for elections to Caldicot Town Council. The Castle ward elects or co-opts three town councillors to the town council.

Labour Party councillor and former mayor, Elaine Davies, died in office from cancer in February 2008, after 12 years in office.

== County Council elections ==
West End is a county electoral ward, electing one county councillor to Monmouthshire County Council.

The seat was won by the Labour Party at the 1995 and 1999 elections. The 2004 election was won by an independent candidate, but returned to Labour at the 2012 election.

At the May 2017 elections, the ward was retained by Cllr Dave Evans, beating the Independent and Conservative candidates. Evans had won the elections in 2008 and 2012.

== See also ==
- Caldicot Castle (electoral ward)
- Severn (Caldicot ward)
