= Chepstow Rural District =

Rural district in Monmouthshire, Wales

Coordinates: 51.639°N 2.678°W

Chepstow Rural District Council
- Population
  - 1911: 7,971
  - 1971: 16,100
- History
  - Created: 1894
  - Abolished: 1974
  - Succeeded by: Monmouth District Council
- Status: Rural District

Chepstow Rural District was a rural district in the administrative county of Monmouthshire, Wales. It was established under the Local Government Act 1894, and was abolished in 1974 when its functions were assumed by the new Monmouth District Council.

The responsibilities of the Rural District Council included housing, sanitation, sewerage, water supply, refuse collection, road maintenance, cemeteries, parks, and licensing of public entertainments. The council's area covered the civil parishes of Caerwent, Caldicot, Devauden, Kilgwrrwg, Llanfihangel nigh Rogiet, Llangwm, Mathern, Portskewett, Rogiet, St. Arvans, Shirenewton, Tintern and Undy. The town of Chepstow itself fell under a separate urban district.

The Rural District Council was particularly involved in the development of Caldicot as a town. In the 1950s it decided that the village should be allowed to double its existing size, to reach a population of about 3,000. Soon afterwards, the government decided to build a new steelworks at Llanwern, and its expansion plans were revised upwards, so that, by the late 1960s, Caldicot had a population of over 7,000. In 1963, the Council bought Caldicot Castle from the Cobb family for £12,000.
