= Caldicot School =

Comprehensive school in Monmouthshire, Wales

Coordinates: 51.58951°N 2.75114°W

Location
- Mill Lane; Caldicot, Monmouthshire, NP26 5XA; Wales

Information
- Type: Comprehensive
- Motto: Committed to Achievement
- Established: 1959
- Local authority: Monmouthshire County Council
- Chair: Paul Glover
- Head teacher: Alun Ebenezer
- Gender: Coeducational
- Age: 11 to 18
- Enrolment: 1238
- Website: http://www.caldicotschool.com/

Caldicot School (Welsh: Ysgol Cil-y-coed) is a coeducational and non-selective secondary school in Caldicot, Monmouthshire, South Wales, with around 1,400 students. In 2013, the school was rated 'Good' by Estyn. At the time of the inspection in November 2013, 11% of pupils were eligible for free school meals against the national average of 17.7%.

== History ==
=== 1958-1968 ===
Caldicot School (formally Caldicot Community College) welcomed its first intake of pupils on 1 September 1958. The College opened with 19 teachers and room to accommodate 400 students in a three-story building, to the west of the school's site. This building later became known as Grayhill Building, named after Grayhill.

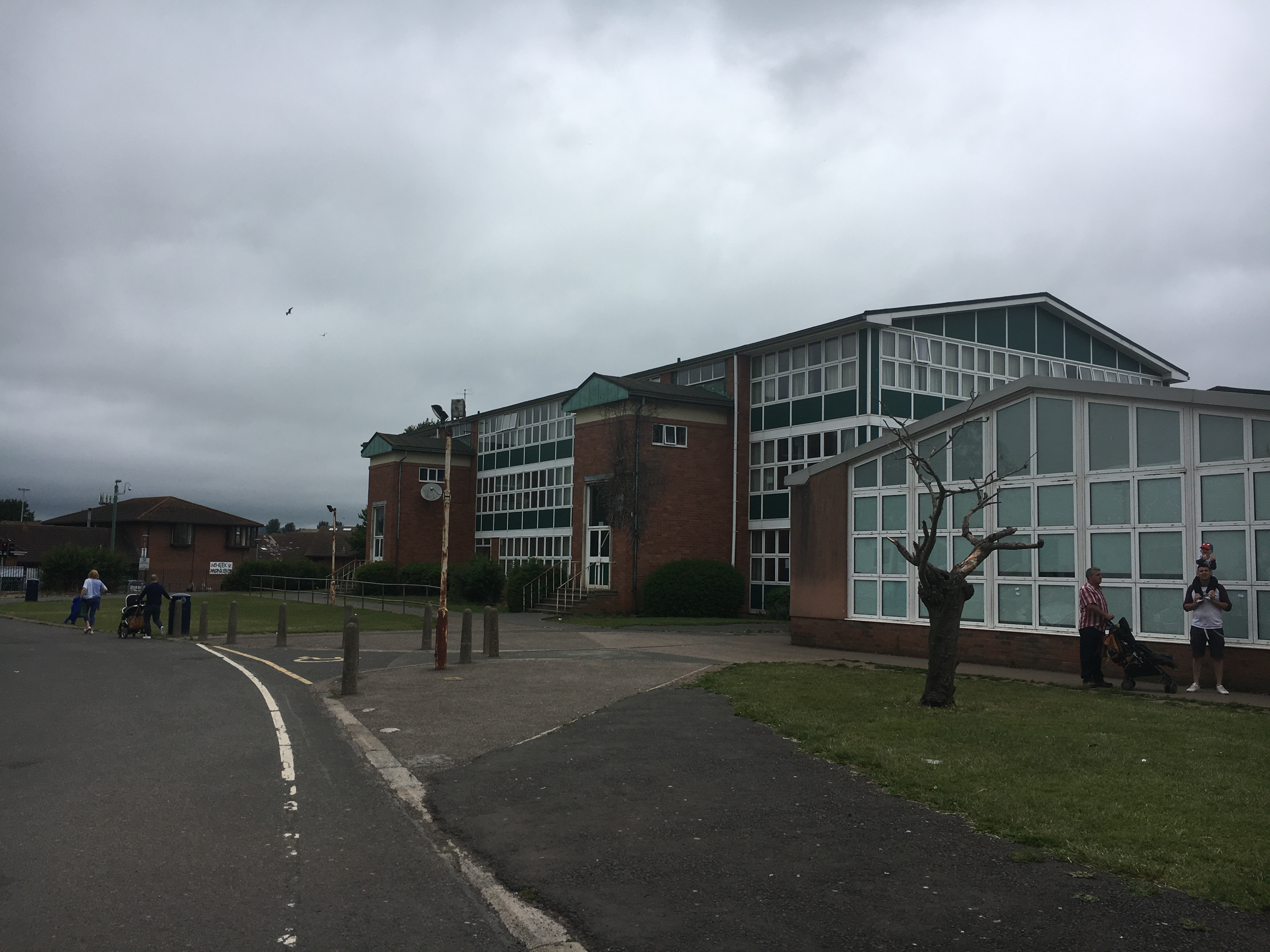
Grayhill Building, pictured 2017

=== 1969-1974 ===
On 3 September 1969 the school became comprehensive and changed its name to Caldicot Comprehensive School. To accommodate more pupils, a new four storey block was opened that could accommodate a further 600 pupils. It housed a canteen, gymnasium, 20 classrooms and a science block. This building was originally known as Upper School, until a further block was built in 1973 making it known as Middle School and then later becoming known as Castle School, named after Caldicot Castle.

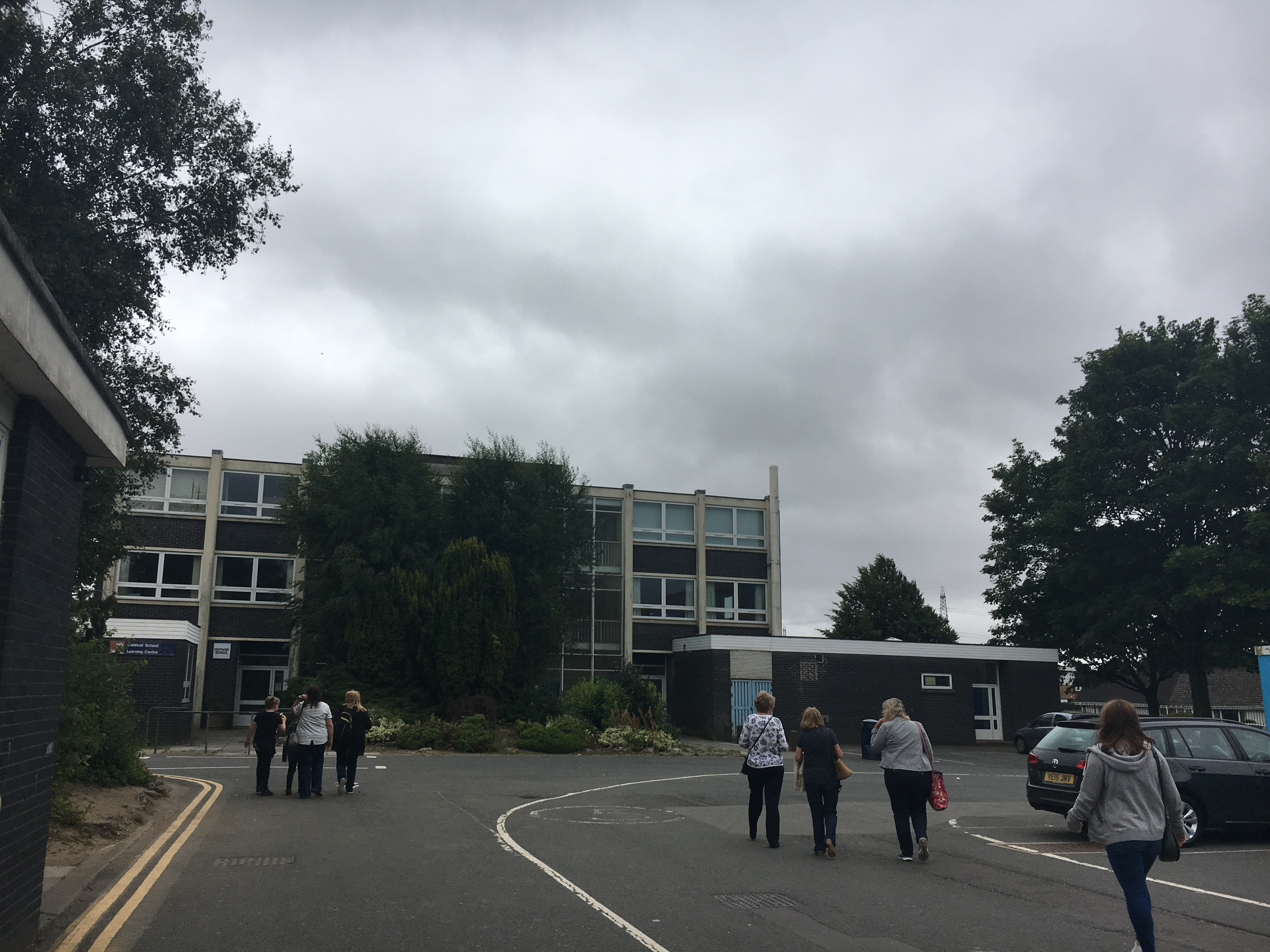
Deepweir Building, pictured in 2017

In 1973 a third block was built, known originally as Upper School, later becoming called Deepweir, named after the Deepweir area of Caldicot. The three storey building was at the eastern end of the school's site and housed the sixth form.

In 1974 Mr. W.A. Silk retired due to ill health. Mr. Eric Blackaby became acting Head Teacher.

=== 1975-1980 ===
In 1975 Mr. C.A. Vanloo became Head Teacher.

=== 1981-2001 ===
In 1981 Mr. J. Norwood became Head Teacher.

The school celebrated its 25th anniversary in 1985 and had 1650 pupils and 99 staff at the time.

In December 2001 Mr. J. Norwood announced he would retire as Head Teacher at the end of the academic year after 22 years' service to the school.

=== 2002-present day ===
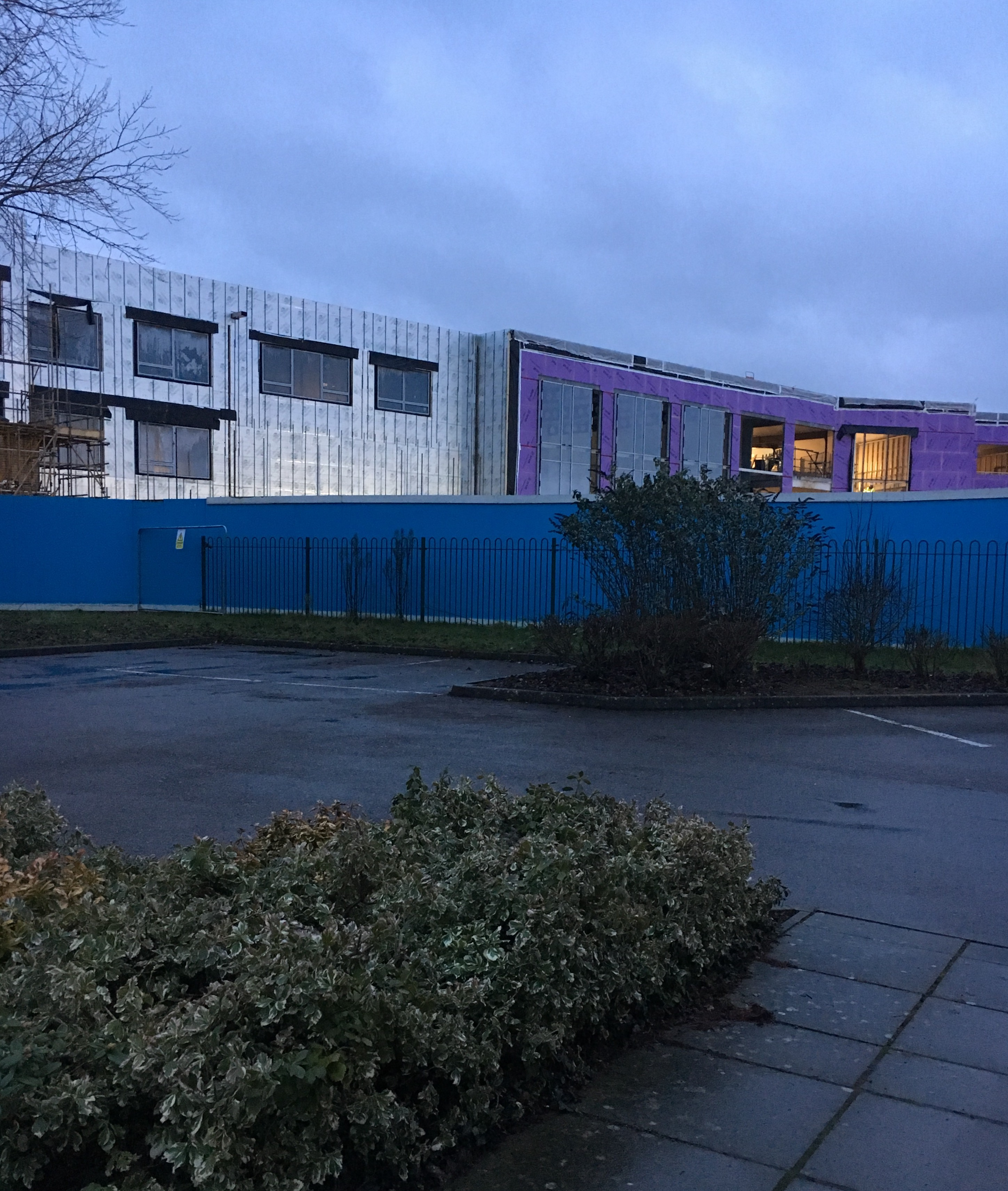
New build during construction, 02/02/17

A £2 million science block was opened in July 2002 which housed four laboratories. The block was connected to the science block in Castle School building.

In September 2002 Mrs. S. Gwyer-Roberts became Head Teacher after the retirement of Mr. J. Norwood.

By the 2000s the school's four teaching buildings were becoming dilapidated and unfit for purpose so a new building was planned. The new build was a result of the Welsh Government's 21st Century Schools & Education Capital Programme. It was scheduled to cost £31million, which then rose to £34.9 million, but at the time of completion it was said to have cost a total of £36.5 million.

In February 2014 a plan to sell four acres of the school's playing field was approved to supermarket chain ASDA, generating £4 million towards the building of the new school. The rest of the money needed for the new build was paid for by Monmouthshire County Council and the Welsh Government.

In early 2016 the Technology Department's building, the 'Tech Block' along with the 'Learning Centre' were knocked down to make-way for the new build. Until the new build's completion, the Technology Department and Learning Centre were housed in temporary buildings on the school's site.

On Monday 11 September 2017 the new build opened. The three floor new building has capacity for 1,500 students and houses all subject departments under one roof, as opposed to the previous four main blocks which served the school.

In autumn 2023, teachers at the school went on strike due to pupil behaviour. Teachers also issued a blacklist of pupils they refused to teach. This resulted in Alun Ebenezer becoming acting headteacher in June 2024. Ebenezer introduced stricter measures to control the behaviour and in January 2025, it was reported that Caldicot pupils were 'safer and happier'. The acting headteacher featured on BBC News after being dubbed as the 'head from hell', explaining his approach.

== Curriculum ==
=== Key Stage 3 ===
In KS3 all students follow the National Curriculum. The KS3 programme of study includes: English, Mathematics, Science, Welsh, Art, Drama, Geography, History, Information & Communication Technology (ICT), Modern Foreign Languages (French and Spanish), Music, Physical Education, Personal & Social Education (PSE), Religious Education and Design & Technology.

=== Key Stage 4 ===
In KS4 pupils must follow the core National Curriculum of English, Mathematics, Science (either Double Award or Triple Award), Welsh Second Language (full course), Religious Studies, PSE and the Welsh Baccalaureate Qualification. In addition pupils must choose three option subjects. A variety of options are available which include some vocation courses.

=== Key Stage 5 ===
In KS5 pupils chose between studying three or four subjects to study to 'A' Level in addition to the Advanced Welsh Baccalaureate qualification.

== Welsh language ==
Although Caldicot School is an English medium school, all pupils must learn Welsh until KS4 in accordance with the Welsh Language Act 1993. Welsh is taught as a second language. According to the school's 2013 Estyn report, 'Very few pupils speak Welsh as their first language.' The report also mentioned 'in Welsh second language, standards and teaching are very good'.

The school started teaching Welsh in 1996 after the Welsh Office ended a dispensation that exempted three comprehensive schools in Monmouthshire to teach Welsh. Until 2017 when the GCSE short course Welsh Second Language qualification was scrapped, Caldicot School was the only school in Monmouthshire to make the full course compulsory to all pupils and had done since September 2008.

The school has a bilingualism policy which supports the role of incidental Welsh within the school and makes sure Welsh is available at A Level.

== School performance ==
=== 2013 Estyn inspection ===
The school was inspected by Estyn in 2013 and placed it as 'Good' in every category. The report said that 'in Welsh second language, standards and teaching are very good'. This was a succession from the school's 2007 inspection which also placed it as 'Good'.

=== 2024 Estyn inspection ===
The school's latest Estyn inspection took place in 2024. The report said that 'Leaders at Caldicot school have recently secured improvements in a few important areas of the school’s work'. It said that pupils 'behave well' and 'many engage purposefully'. However, the report also noted that 'work has not had enough impact on improving important aspects including attendance, the provision for skills and the additional learning needs (ALN) provision'.

=== Welsh Government Banding ===
In 2014, 2015 and 2016, the school was placed in the 'Yellow Band' of the Welsh Government's education banding system. In 2014 and 2015, the school's improvement capacity was graded a Grade B but in 2016, it was graded a Grade A.

=== GCSE Results ===
In 2022 73% of pupils achieved the Level 2 threshold, which is the volume of qualifications equivalent to the volume of 5 GCSEs at Grade A*-C including one in English and one in Mathematics. 33% of students achieved 5 or more A*-A grades and 20% of students achieved 10 or more A*-A grades.

=== A Level Results ===
In 2024, 100% of students achieved the Level 3 threshold, achieving 3 A*-E grades. 80% of students achieved 3 A*-C grades and 29% of students achieved 3 A*-A grades.

== Extracurricular activities ==
The school offers a variety of extracurricular activities ranging from a Welsh club to a judo club. The Estyn 2013 inspection report stated that 'pupils participate in a wide-variety of extra curricular activities within school and in the local community, such as the Caldicot food bank and raising money for Ty Hafan'.

Every year, the Welsh department students celebrates St. David's Day by holding an Eisteddfod for Year 7 pupils; 'A' Level Welsh pupils help to arrange the Eisteddfod.

== Uniform ==
In September 2015, a new uniform with a new school logo was introduced for pupils in Years 7 to 11. KS3 & KS4 pupils are expected to a wear full school uniform which consists of a black blazer, with an embroidered school badge, a white shirt, school tie and black formal trousers. The girls are also allowed to wear a black knee length skirt.

In September 2015, a business-style dress code was introduced for the Sixth Form.

== Notable former staff members ==
- Brian Price - physical education teacher
- John Nettleship - chemistry teacher
- Mark Labbett - maths teacher
- Rhys Edwards - physical education teacher
- Brynmor Williams - physical education teacher
