= Caldicot =

Town in Monmouthshire, Wales

Caldicot: Welsh: Cil-y-coed
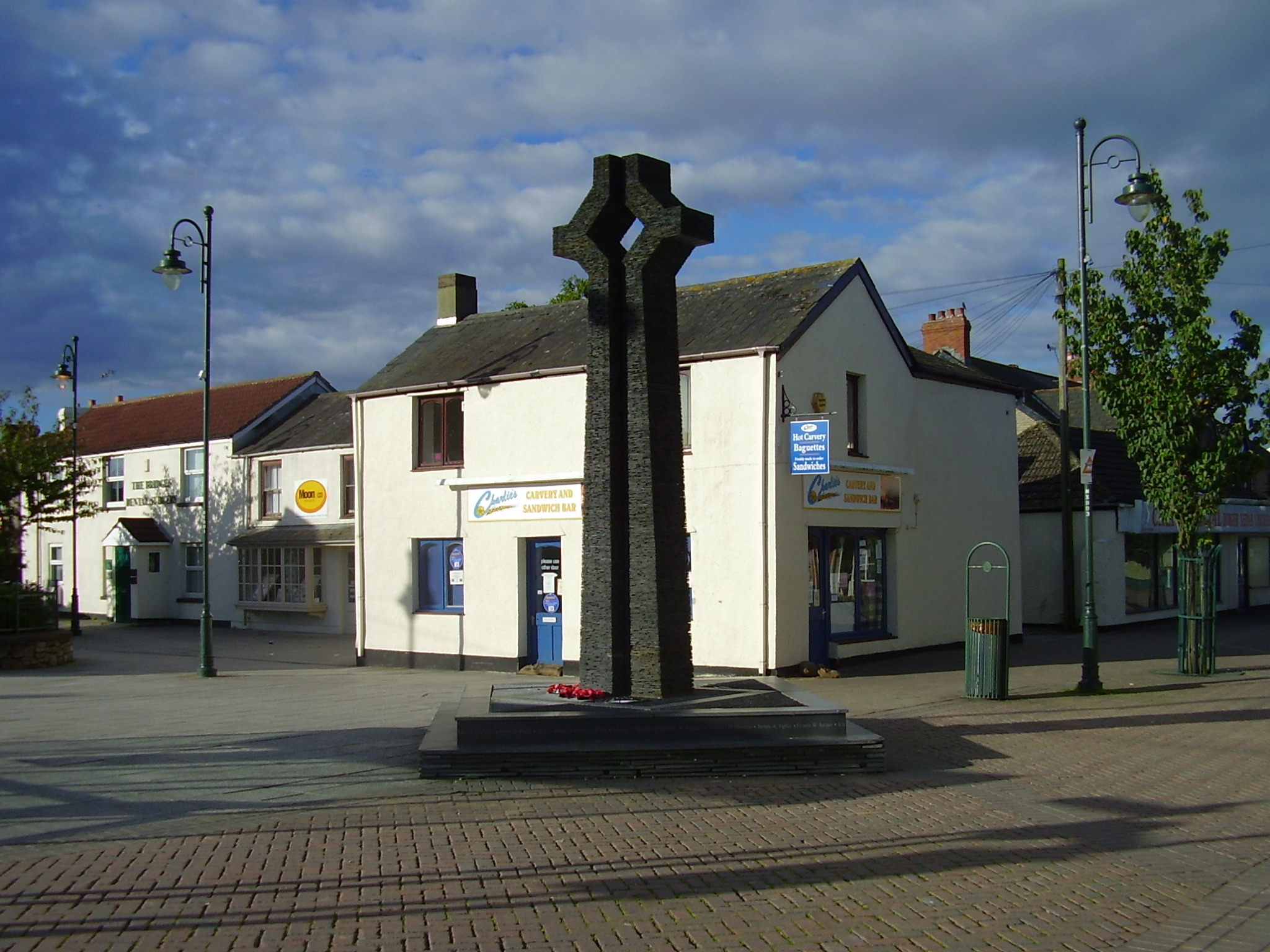
- Caldicot Cross in the town centre, a memorial to the deaths of local soldiers in World War I, World War II and other conflicts.

- Location within Monmouthshire
- Population: 9,813 (2021 Census)
- OS grid reference: ST475885
- Principal area: Monmouthshire
- Preserved county: Gwent
- Country: Wales
- Sovereign state: United Kingdom
- Post town: CALDICOT
- Postcode district: NP26
- Dialling code: 01291
- Police: Gwent
- Fire: South Wales
- Ambulance: Welsh
- UK Parliament: Monmouthshire
- List of places UK Wales Monmouthshire 51.5910°N 2.7492°W Map of the community

Caldicot (Welsh: Cil-y-coed) is a market town and community in Monmouthshire, Wales. The town is located between Chepstow and the city of Newport. The site adjoins the Caldicot Levels, on the north side of the Severn Estuary. The population of the built-up area was around 11,000. It has a large school, Caldicot School, and is known for its medieval castle. The built-up area includes Portskewett. Caldicot had a population of 9,604 in 2011.

== History ==
There was considerable activity in the area during the Bronze Age. Excavations near the Nedern Brook beside the castle revealed a plank from a boat and complex wooden structures in the former river bed. The boat probably traded across the Severn with the farmers and traders of Somerset. Later, in Roman times, it is likely that trading vessels sailed up the Nedern Brook to Caerwent. The discovery of kilns also shows that coarse pottery was produced in the village during Roman times.

The name 'Caldicot' is usually stated to derive from the Old English phrase calde cot meaning 'cold hut'. A cold hut is an exposed shelter used by either humans or animals. The modern Welsh name, Cil-y-coed, meaning "corner of the wood", referring to Wentwood, was proposed by the 19th-century lexicographer William Owen Pughe as the origin of the English name, but his hypothesis has been discredited. The modern use of this form has been described as a "very recent innovation".

In 1074, following the Norman Conquest, the manor of Caldicot was given to Durand, the Sheriff of Gloucester. Caldicot was recorded in Gloucestershire by the Domesday Book in 1086. Its entry reads, Durand the Sheriff holds of the King, one land, in Caerwent, called Caldicot. He has in demesne there 3 ploughs, and 15 half villeins, and 4 bondmen, and one knight. All these have twelve ploughs. There is a mill worth ten shillings.

One of the oldest buildings in Caldicot, Llanthony Secunda Manor, was built around 1120 as a grange for monks from Llanthony Secunda Priory in Gloucester.

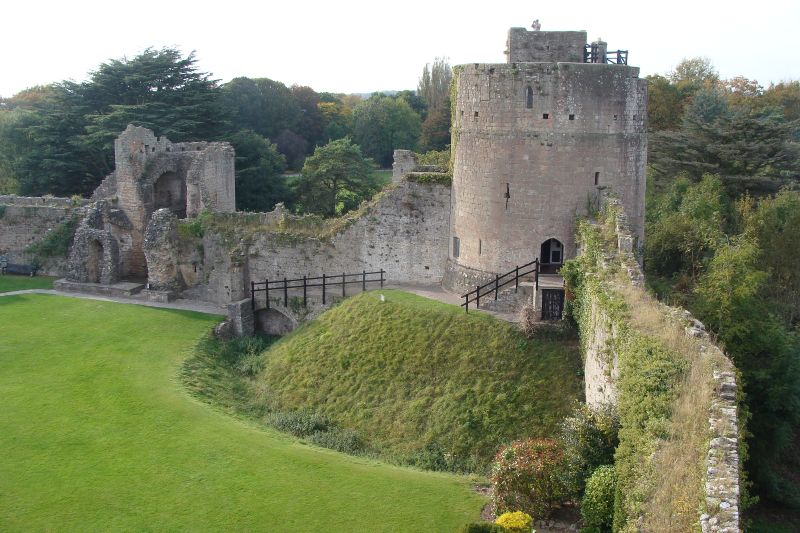
Caldicot Castle

In 1158 the manor of Caldicot passed to Humphrey II de Bohun, who was responsible for building the stone keep and curtain walls of the present-day castle. In 1376 it passed to Thomas of Woodstock, fifth son of King Edward III, when he married Eleanor de Bohun. It began to fall into ruins around the 16th century.

Caldicot is one of the few villages to appear on the Cambriae Typus map of 1573.

By the mid-19th century, Caldicot was a small farming village. However, the opening of the South Wales Railway brought London and Cardiff within relatively easy reach (although Caldicot station itself was not opened until 1936). The railway attracted industry, and 1862 Henry Hughes of Tintern opened a wireworks next to the railway, becoming the village's major employer and attracting many new workers. In 1880 it became a tinplate works for the canning industry. In 1879 work began on the Severn Tunnel, which was opened in 1886. Its construction brought hundreds of workers to Caldicot, roughly doubling its population.

Court House was the home of the baker Henry Jones, the inventor of self-raising flour, from 1864 until his death in 1891. He is buried in the churchyard.

During the first half of the 20th century, Caldicot continued to grow steadily, but unspectacularly, reaching a population of 1,770 in 1951. Early in the 1950s, however, Chepstow Rural District Council decided that the village should be allowed to expand to approximately 3,000. Shortly after this decision, the government decided to build a new steelworks at Llanwern. Caldicot was designated as a suitable home for the thousands of steelworkers, and expansion plans were revised upwards. Llanwern steelworks opened in 1962, and by the end of the decade Caldicot had over 7,000 residents.

The growth of the community was furthered by the opening of the Severn Bridge in 1966. With Caldicot now being part of the "M4 corridor" new businesses, such as the telecommunication company Mitel, came to the town, compensating for the contraction of the steel industry and the railways.

== Religion ==
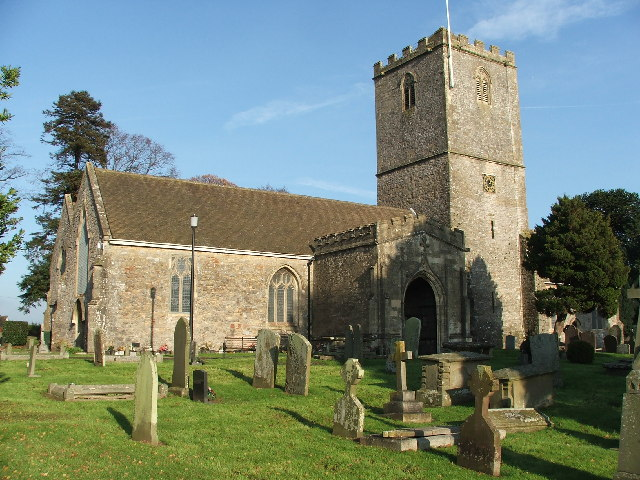
St Mary's Church

The parish church of St Mary, also called St Mary Virgin Church, is a Church in Wales parish church. There is evidence that the church has pre-Norman foundations; however, the earliest part of the building dates from the 14th century. It is a Grade I listed building. It is mainly built in the Perpendicular style of the late 14th and 15th centuries.

== Education ==
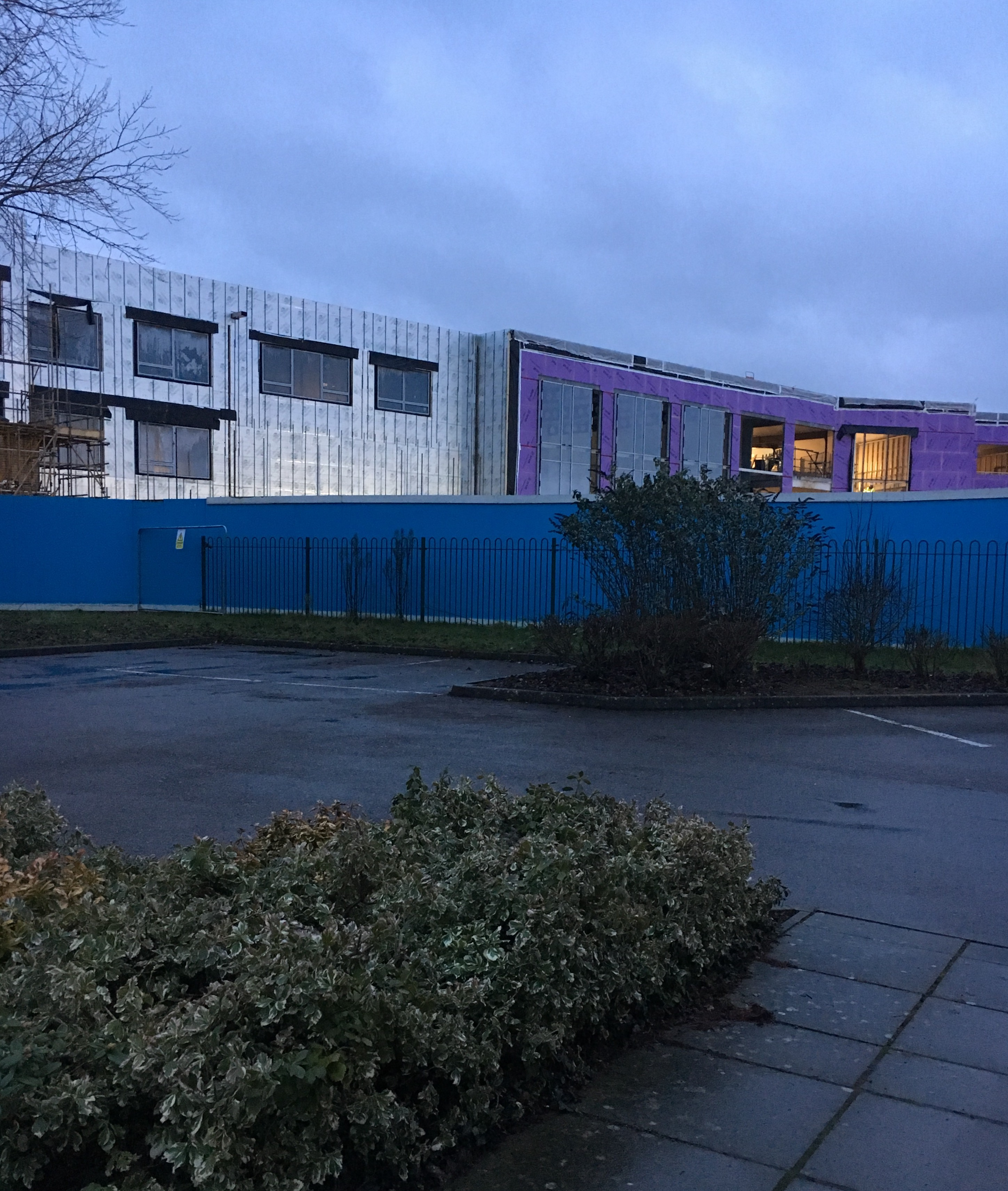
New building at Caldicot School, February 2017

Caldicot School was substantially rebuilt and the new buildings opened in September 2017. It will house all subject departments in one single building. The project was part of the Welsh Government's "21st Century Schools & Education Capital Programme". The new building has capacity for 1,500 pupils and was to cost £31million which then rose to £34.9 million. By October 2016, the total cost was said to have risen to £40.175 million.

== Governance ==
Caldicot Town Council comprises seventeen elected or co-opted town councillors, from five community wards, namely Castle, Dewstow, Green Lane, Severn and West End. Caldicot Castle, Dewstow, Green Lane, Severn and West End are also county wards to Monmouthshire County Council, each electing one county councillor.

== Attractions and amenities ==
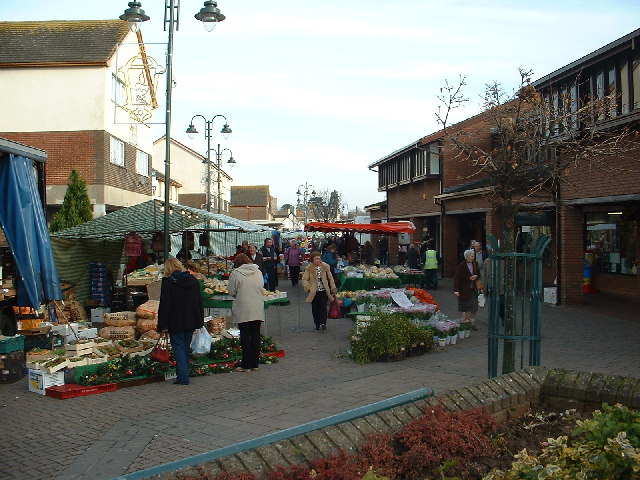
The pedestrianised town centre of Caldicot on market day

Caldicot is the location of Caldicot Castle and lake. The area has popular waymarked footpaths along the Caldicot Levels and the coastal path can be walked. Nearby are Caerwent and Wentwood. To the north-west, Dewstow House dates from c.1804. Extensive gardens and grottoes built after 1895 have been undergoing restoration since 2000 and are now open to the public.

Five primary schools are located in the area, two of which were created from local Infant and Junior Schools. Durand Primary (with nursery), Ysgol Gymraeg Y Ffin (Welsh-medium education provision for south Monmouthshire), Castle Park Primary (formed from Sandy Lane Infant School and St Mary's Juniors), Dewstow Primary (formally of West End Infants and Green Lane Juniors) and ARW (Archbishop Rowan Williams Church of Wales Primary School) in Portskewett. Caldicot is the nearest town to the Welsh side opening of the Severn railway tunnel, although the nearest station serving the line through the tunnel, Severn Tunnel Junction, is at Rogiet, a village which was developed in modern times largely to service the railway. Caldicot library was built in 1995. Caldicot Leisure Centre has a sports centre, one of four leisure centres in Monmouthshire. Its facilities include an indoor swimming pool, squash courts and both indoor and outdoor games pitches, and a gym. The Leisure Centre is located next to Caldicot School. A new astroturf pitch was built before 2013.

== Transport ==
Caldicot station on the Gloucester–Newport line serves the town, with services to cities like Newport, Cardiff and Gloucester as well to Bristol. Transport by road allows access to the M4 / M48 motorway. There is also access by road across the Second Severn Crossing and Severn Bridge to Bristol and South England.

== Twinning ==
Caldicot is twinned with Waghäusel, Germany and Morières-lès-Avignon France.

== See also ==
- Caldicot Hundred
- Caldicot railway station
- Nedern Brook Wetlands
