= Caldicot Castle (electoral ward) =

Coordinates: 51.598°N 2.748°W

- Electoral ward
- Location within Monmouthshire
- Population: 1,919 (2011 census)
- Community: Caldicot
- Principal area: Monmouthshire
- Country: Wales
- Sovereign state: United Kingdom
- UK Parliament: Newport East
- Senedd Cymru – Welsh Parliament: Newport East
- Councillors: 1 (County), 3 (Town)

Caldicot Castle is an electoral ward in the town of Caldicot, Monmouthshire, Wales. The ward elects councillors to Caldicot Town Council and Monmouthshire County Council.

== Description ==
The Caldicot Castle ward covers the northern corner of the Caldicot community bordered to the north by the A48 road (and Caerwent) and to the east by the community/ward of Portskewett. The eponymous medieval Caldicot Castle and museum is located in the parkland to the southeast of the ward.

According to the 2001 UK Census the population of the Caldicot Castle ward was 1,879, increasing slightly to 1,919 by the 2011 UK Census.

== Town Council elections ==
Castle is a community ward for elections to Caldicot Town Council. The Castle ward elects or co-opts three town councillors to the town council .

A by-election in August 2016, to fill a vacant seat, saw Oliver Edwards win for the Labour Party, replacing Labour councillor Alan Davies. Edwards' father had been a town councillor until 2009.

== County Council elections ==
Caldicot Castle is a county electoral ward, electing one county councillor to Monmouthshire County Council.

The seat was won by the Labour Party at the 1995 and 1999 elections. The 2004 election was won by Plaid Cymru, who retained the seat in 2008. At the 2012 election Labour won the seat back.

At the May 2017 elections, the ward was won by Jo Watkins for the Liberal Democrats, beating the Labour and Conservative candidates in a close race.

2017 Monmouthshire County Council election
Party	Candidate	Votes	%	±%
Liberal Democrats	Jo Watkins	271		
Labour	Jeff Williams	253		
Conservative	Tim Fawcitt	247		

== See also ==
- Severn (Caldicot ward)
- West End (Caldicot ward)
