= St Mary's Church, Caldicot =

Coordinates: 51.5941°N 2.7475°W

St Mary's Church
- Church of St Mary
- St Mary Virgin church
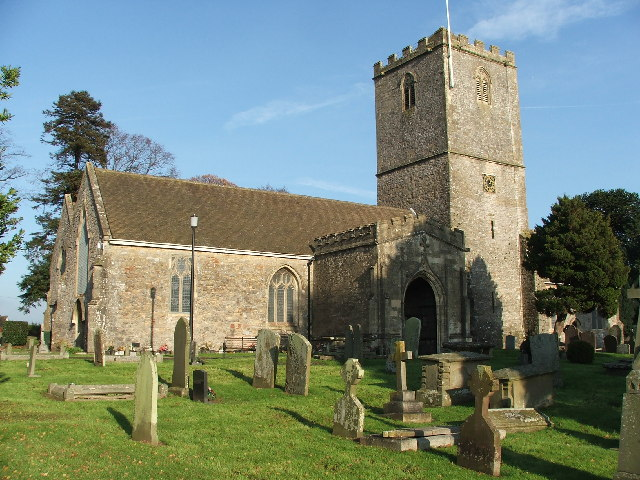
- St Mary's Church
- Denomination: Church in Wales

History
- Status: active
- Founder: Walter of Gloucester
- Dedication: Mary, Mother of Jesus

Architecture
- Heritage designation: Grade I
- Designated: 1955

Administration
- Diocese: Diocese of Monmouth
- Deanery: Netherwent
- Parish: Rectorial Benefice of Caldicot

St Mary's Church, also called St Mary Virgin Church, is a Church in Wales parish church in Caldicot, Monmouthshire, Wales. There is evidence that the church has pre-Norman foundations; however, the earliest part of the building dates from the 14th century. It is a Grade I listed building.

== History ==
There are records that there was a church at this location before the Norman conquest of Wales as it is mentioned in Domesday Book and by a charter from King John of England however there is nothing surviving in the current church building from that period. This is reportedly because of Augustinian canons from Llanthony Secunda visited and built the church on top of the older church that was dedicated to St Bride dating from around AD 900 at the behest of Walter of Gloucester after the construction of Caldicot Castle. The earliest part of the church is the base of the tower, which comes from the 14th century, along with the nave and chancel, which was part of an enlargement programme at the time. The tower was not fully completed until the 16th century.

In the 1850s, the 15th-century north aisle was rebuilt by Henry Woodyer, as well as most of the stained glass windows being replaced. In 1905, the chancel was refitted and many of the Victorian additions were changed.

=== Modern history ===
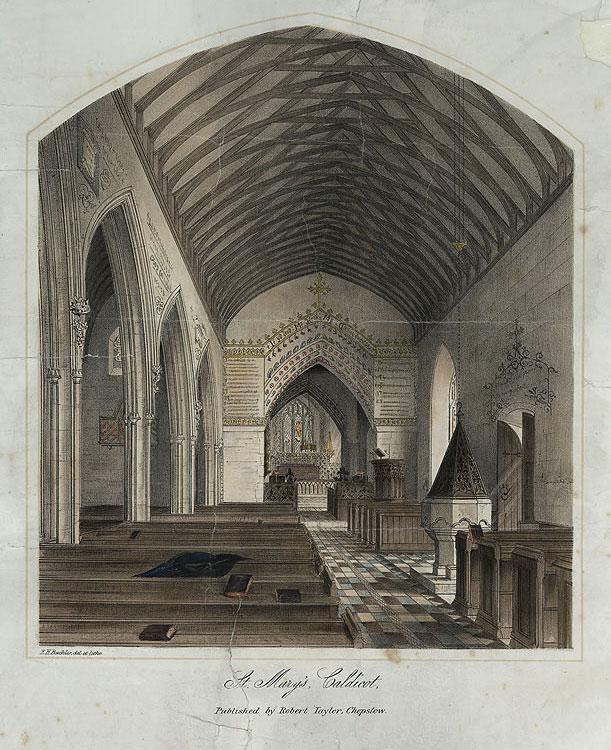
An 1865 lithograph of the interior

The church was granted Grade I listed status in 1955, with the reason for it being listed given as "...a fine medieval church with interesting Victorian restorations and additions." It was used as a location for the filming of the 2002 film Plots with a View.
