= Caerwent Training Area =

Military site in Monmouthshire, Wales

- Caerwent, Monmouthshire
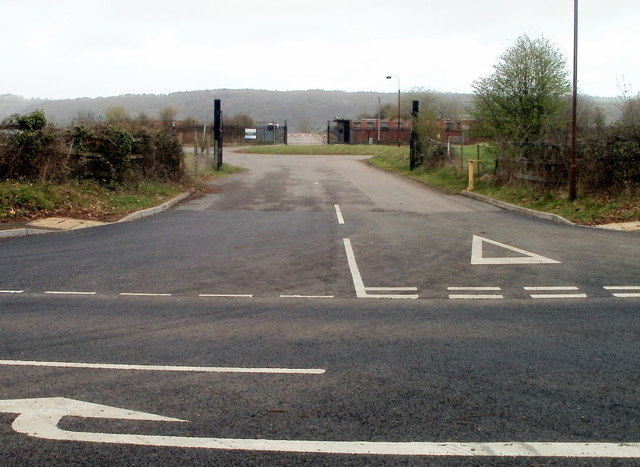
- West Gate, Caerwent Training Area

Site information
- Type: Training Area
- Owner: Ministry of Defence
- Operator: Admiralty

Location
- Location within Monmouthshire Caerwent Training Area (the United Kingdom)
- Coordinates: 51.6167°N 2.7648°W

Site history
- Built: 1939
- Built for: Admiralty
- In use: 1939–Present

Caerwent Training Area is a British military installation at Caerwent, Monmouthshire, Wales. The large military site is situated north of the A48 road about 5 mi (8.0 km) west of Chepstow and 12 miles (19 km) east of Newport.

Established as the Royal Navy Propellant Factory, Caerwent in 1939, it was later used for the storage of Royal Naval propellant and then the storage of munitions. Between 1967 and 1993 it was used a US Army storage depot. It appears to have been used informally as a training area after its closure as a US Army storage base. (Note: An archived version of Parry, issued in 1997, states that local farmers, who were grazing cattle on the site between buildings, after the closure of the US Army Weapons Storage base in 1993, allowed it to be used for training purposes. The phrase was: recently used.)

Caerwent Barracks is to be built on the site to house 1st The Queen's Dragoon Guards and 1st Battalion, The Rifles from 2027.

== Royal Navy Propellant Factory, Caerwent ==
In the summer of 1936, the Admiralty drew up their requirements for a new naval propellant factory for the Navy to supplement the output of the, First World War, Royal Naval Cordite Factory, Holton Heath (RNCF Holton Health) which was to remain in use. It would also provide a second source of supply of naval propellants, should the RNCF suffer air raid damage. Approval to build was given in January 1939.

The main priorities for selecting a suitable site were:

- the establishment should not be vulnerable to air attack;
- should not be located in an industrial area, but sufficiently close to a populated area to provide an adequate workforce;
- should be close to a railway and to main roads, to facilitate transport of raw materials, finished products and the workforce;
- should be located on rough grassland with a gravel on sand subsoil with good natural drainage and a slope of about 1 in 30 to provide maximum safety in the highly dangerous nitroglycerine manufacturing and handling areas;
- the higher part should not have an elevation of not less than 100 ft (30 m) above the lowest part to limit the internal gradients.

The RNPF was designed by a team of staff drawn from both the RNCF and the Admiralty's consulting engineers, Freeman, Fox and Partners. Freeman, Fox and Partners had designed the Royal Naval Cordite Factory, Holton Heath, at the start of World War One. The overall design was based on a scheme of passive defence from air attack, by duplicating essential facilities. So, RNPF Caerwent was to have two cordite units each with their own coal-fired power station, for producing both steam, for heating, and electricity. Each cordite unit was designed to have a production capacity of 75 tons (76.2 tonnes) of cordite per week. The shared central facilities, serving both production units, included: search rooms, transit sheds, canteens, welfare facilities and administration buildings.

=== Water supplies ===
Caerwent was chosen from one of at least four sites under consideration. It was the availability of a water supply from the Great Western Railway (GWR) that was one of the deciding factors. Like all explosive factories of this type, a capacious supply of drinking-quality water was required for use in the manufacturing processes. To manufacture 150 tons of cordite per week the two factory units would need a total of 3 million imperial gallons (14,000 m^{3}) of drinking quality water per day.

In the latter part of the 19th century, the GWR had undertaken the engineering feat of constructing the Severn Tunnel under the River Severn. One of the major difficulties encountered underground was the 'Great Spring', which necessitated the pumping of over 9 million gallons (41,000 m^{3}) of water per day, at Sudbrook, from the western end of the tunnel, conveniently located only three miles (5 km) away from the proposed site at Caerwent. Even during the great drought of 1934 the lowest daily return was 9.1 million imperial gallons (41,000 m^{3}). The GWR used about 1.5 million imperial gallons (6,800 m^{3}) per day themselves, so there was always a guaranteed daily surplus of 7.5 million imperial gallons (34,000 m^{3}).

=== Construction work ===
The site was connected to the Great Western railway at Caldicot Junction, near Sudbrook by way of a private branch line, sometimes known as the MoD Caerwent siding. There were a number of transfer sidings within the factory.

Work began to create the propellants factory in 1939. A total of £4.7 million was spent on buildings and roads, and £2.5 million on plant and equipment. The site's total area was 1,580 acres (6.4 km^{2}) of land with a total of 1,163 acres (4.71 km^{2}) enclosed within the factory fence. The scale of site consumed the village of Dinham which was located at the northern edge of the RNPF Caerwent.

By the end of 1940, the Main Office block was complete, and in December of that year the Unit 1 Sulphuric Acid Factory went into production with acid mixing for the Nitrocellulose and Nitroglycerine manufacturing. Five months later, the Pressure Oxidation Plant for the manufacture of Nitric acid came on stream. In August 1941 the Nitrocellulose and Nitroglycerine plants were operational and were soon working 24 hours a day on a three-shift pattern. At the same time, Unit 2 of the factory was almost completed, so RNPF Caerwent was now virtually operational.

== Cold War use of the RNPF site ==
Between 1955 and 1966, Caerwent produced the Gosling solid rocket booster for the Seaslug missile. This Cold War work began in wartime buildings, the horizontal presses in Press Houses 3 and a longer press in 1, and with other work in a disused blending house and the Tetryl Acetone Recovery building. From 1957 dedicated buildings, J1...J6, were constructed on the eastern side of the site for the production of guided weapons propellants. Buildings J7...J9 at the northern edge of the site formed a static testing site, where these motors could be test-fired. J7 was an environmental conditioning building where charges could be heated to 70 °C or cooled to -40 °C before testing. These buildings were of typical flat-roofed red brick construction, shielded by large earth traverses. Testing work was also carried out here on the Magpie, Redtop and Sealyham rocket motors.

Early in the 1960s, a Parliamentary working party recommended that propellants for the three branches of the armed services should be concentrated at the Royal Ordnance Factory at ROF Bishopton. The decision to close RNPF Caerwent was announced on 25 March 1965. Production continued during the following two-year rundown phase. The last Gosling motor was produced at Caerwent on 14 June 1966; and the remaining charges and tooling were transferred to ROF Bishopton.

== Transfer of RNPF Caerwent to the US Army ==
RAF Caerwent was transferred to US administration after Charles de Gaulle almost completely expelled United States Department of Defense activities from France in 1967. Caerwent became part of the United States Army European 'theatre reserve stocks' under the command of the United States Army's "47th Area Support Group Reserve Storage Activity", and became known as USADA Caerwent (United States Arms Depot Activity – Caerwent).

The US Army spent over £4 million constructing 300 magazines and converting some of the former RNPF structures to conform to the required specification. The material stored included small arms ammunition, artillery shells (up to 8"), anti-tank mines, grenades, flares, and the multiple launch rocket system. The first shipments of shells, rockets, mines, flares and small arms ammo arrived early in 1968 with shipments arriving by rail as far as practicable.

Circa 1982–83, Caerwent was under the administration of Reserve Storage Activity Caerwent, 47th Area Support Group, 21st Support Command, United States Army Europe.

At its height, Caerwent was among the larger ammunition depots in Western Europe, storing over 80,000 tonnes of conventional munitions, a substantial fraction of the US Army's European stocks. In 1990 Caerwent shipped 12,000 tons of ammunition to the Middle East and played a critical part in Operation Desert Shield and Desert Storm.

Following the change in the political climate in Europe and subsequent scaling down of operations, the US Army announced it was to close down their storage operations at the establishment in June 1992. Over 60,000 tonnes of munitions were moved out over a period of less than ten months. The last batch was removed by train on 19 July 1993. The formal closure ceremony took place on 20 August 1993.

== Post-RNPF use of railway connections ==
After the privatisation of British Rail, RNPF Caerwent like a number of other MOD sites with internal railway sidings, was used as a secure storage area for holding surplus locomotives and rolling stock that might be returned to use. Between 2004 and 2005, a small number of electric locomotives, particularly in the British Rail Class 86 and British Rail Class 87, were scrapped at RNPF Caerwent. British Rail Classes 101 and 102 diesel multiple units were also scrapped at Caerwent, in 2004, by a company called JT Landscapes.

Between 2008 and 2014, the railway tracks were removed but the trackbeds left in situ. A number of unsafe buildings and redundant acid storage facilities have also been removed since 2014.

In summer 2022, work began to remove the final stretches of track that remained within the site and on the connecting branch line. The disassembled rails will be transported to the Gwili Railway, a Welsh heritage railway at Carmarthen. 1.2 km of the former branch line near Porthskewett, owned by Monmouthshire County Council, is to be converted into a footpath and cycleway.

== Future barracks ==
Caerwent is now a major training area covering over 1,500 acres (6.1 km^{2}), capable of sustaining up to 1,000 troops. There are not only over 400 buildings and bunkers on the site, but also a comprehensive road system, for logistics exercises and driver training. Improvements to the site were completed at a cost of £150,000 in November 2015.

The 1st The Queen's Dragoon Guards and 1st Battalion, The Rifles are scheduled to move to the new Caerwent Barracks when building is completed in 2028.

== Filming location ==
Scenes from the Hollywood blockbuster Captain America: The First Avenger were filmed on site in October 2010. Caerwent was also used in an episode of the motoring TV show, Top Gear.
