= Rogiet Hoard =

Hoard found in Wales

Coordinates: 51.589°N 2.787°W

- Size: 3,778 coins
- Period/culture: Romano-British
- Discovered: Rogiet, Monmouthshire by Colin Roberts on 10 September 1998
- Present location: National Museum Wales
- Identification: 1998–99 Figs 306.1–6

The Rogiet Hoard is a hoard of 3,778 Roman coins found near Rogiet, Monmouthshire, Wales in September 1998. The coins dated from 253 up until 295–296. The hoard notably contained several faulty issues, and some rare denominations, including those depicting the usurper emperors Carausius and Allectus.

== Discovery and valuation ==
The hoard was discovered by metal detectorist Colin Roberts on 10 September 1998 and, after a coroner's inquest in December, 1998 was declared a treasure.

It was valued at £40,000 and is now owned by the National Museum and Galleries of Wales.

== Items discovered ==
The hoard contained 3,778 silver radiates, including seven denarii, of which just over a third came from the reign of Probus (276–282). The latest coin was struck around 295–296.

766 of the coins were struck during the reigns of the usurper emperors, Carausius, and his eventual murderer and successor, Allectus. Coins from these reigns are infrequently found in hoards, and several of them depicted Roman warships. Carausius also struck coins bearing the images of Diocletian and Maximian in order to ingratiate himself with them, and one example had all three men on it with the words "Carausius et fratres sui" (Carausius and his brothers). This example was described as "one of the finest specimens of this issue yet recorded".

The hoard containing "significant numbers" of Allectus quinarii or Q-radiates, coupled with the total number of "improved issue" coins from the Aurelian to Diocletian reigns—after Aurelian's monetary reformation—made it an "unprecedented" single deposit from these categories.

Another rare coin, a Divus Nigrinian, was remarked to be only the second recorded British example found.

Reign	Date	No. of coins
Valerian	253–260	23
Gallienus	253–268	58
Postumus	259–268	41
Victorinus	268–270	60
Tetricus I/II	270–273	2
Claudius II	268–270	28
Quintillus	270	8
Aurelian	270–275	355
Tacitus	275–276	641
Florian	276	40
Probus	276–282	1,327
Carus	282–283	113
Carausius	287–293	16
Allectus	293–296	751
Diocletian	284–305	170
Maximian	286–305	98
Uncertain	–	47

== See also ==
- List of hoards in Britain
