= Church Farmhouse, Caldicot =

Building in Monmouthshire, Wales

Church Farmhouse
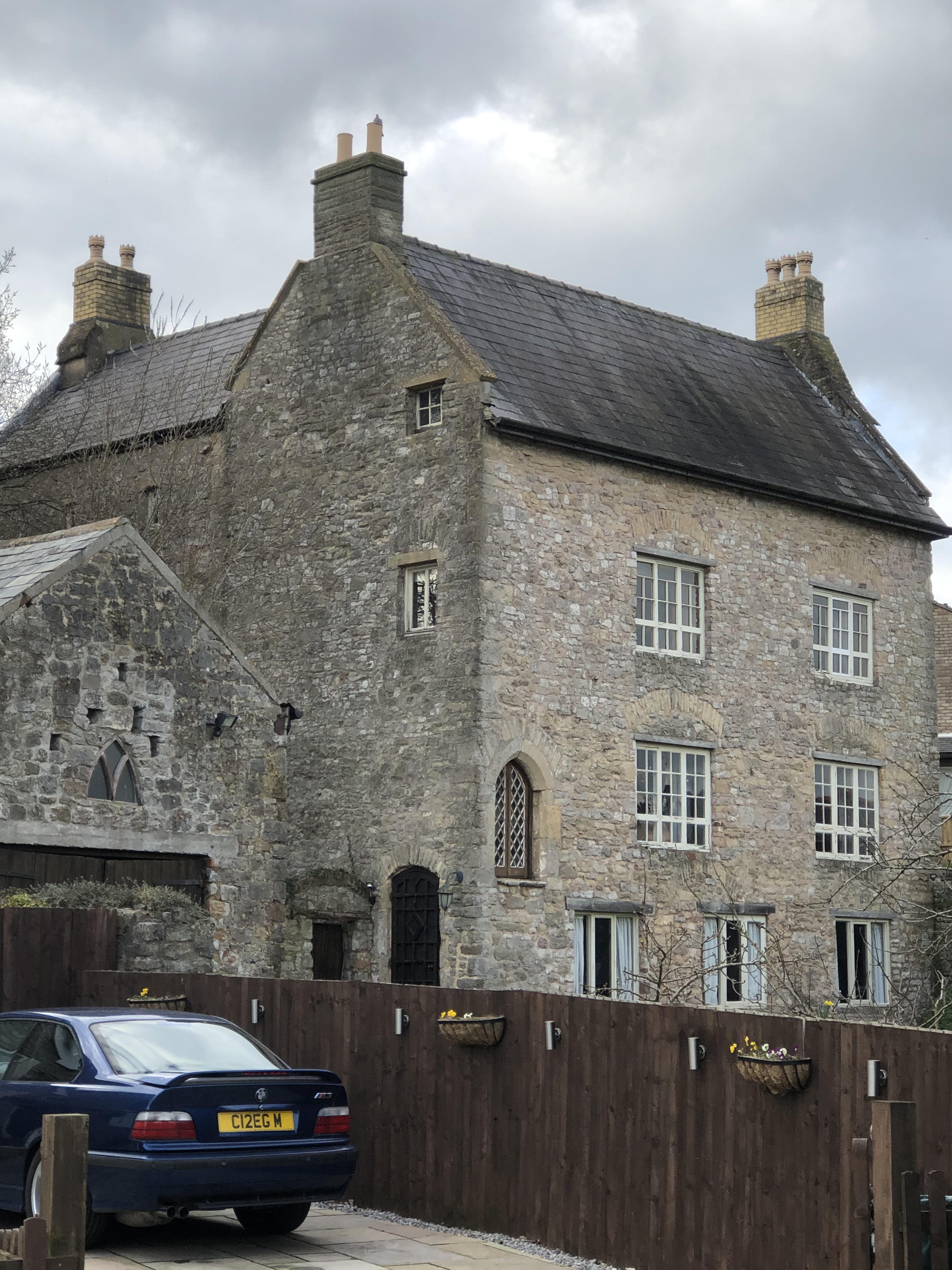
- "exceptionally rare and interesting"

- Location within Monmouthshire
- 51.5958°N 2.7487°W
- Type: House
- Location: Caldicot, Monmouthshire

History
- Built: Medieval

Site notes
- Architectural style: Vernacular
- Governing body: Privately owned

Listed Building – Grade II*
- Official name: Church Farmhouse
- Designated: 7 May 1973
- Reference no.: 2055

Listed Building – Grade II
- Official name: Barn at Church Farm
- Designated: 17 July 1980
- Reference no.: 2756

Church Farmhouse, Caldicot, Monmouthshire is a substantial grange building which was a working farmhouse before 1205. It is connected to both Llanthony Prima in Monmouthshire and Llanthony Secunda in Gloucester. It was established as a grange farm for Llanthony Secunda Priory in the 12th century with the lands in Caldicot being given to the monastery in 1137. It is a Grade II* listed building. The adjacent barn has its own Grade II listing.

== History and description ==
The establishment of Church Farmhouse is traditionally suggested to have been a grange to Llanthony Secunda Priory in Gloucestershire. The architectural historian John Newman, writing in his Gwent/Monmouthshire volume of the Buildings of Wales series, notes that the priory acquired land in Caldicot in the 12th century. (Note: John Newman's entry for Church Farm, in his Gwent/Monmouthshire Pevsner, appears under the title Llanthony Secunda Manor, a name which he notes is a "modern adoption".) The subsequent, extensive, rebuilding, in particular, a major expansion around 1600, has created a "rather confusing" building history. Cadw suggests that, if it was a monastic grange, it would have been dissolved in either 1536 or 1539. A second tradition regarding the house is that it came into the personal possession of Henry VIII at this time. The house was extended around 1600, when Cadw indicates it may have become a rectory. Aside from a small Victorian extension, reroofing of the tower in the 1940s, and the removal of cement render from the walls in the 1970s, the house remains largely unaltered, although Newman notes that the farmhouse's setting has been "drastically compromised by late 20th century housing".

The house is constructed of local limestone and is to an L-plan, of three storeys to the east range and four to the south. The south-west range contains a set of medieval rooms, which Newman describes as "on an oddly miniature scale". Cadw suggests that these were "monastic dormitories (each) with its own secure closet and garderobe" and notes "it is very remarkable that such an arrangement should have survived so completely".

The house, which is currently for sale, remains privately owned. Its Cadw listing record describes Church Farmhouse as "an exceptionally rare and interesting monastic building". The adjacent barn, which dates from the 18th century, has its own Grade II listing.

== Sources ==
- Newman, John (2000). Gwent/Monmouthshire. The Buildings of Wales. London: Penguin. ISBN 0-14-071053-1.
