= St Michael and All Angels Church, Llanfihangel Rogiet =

Coordinates: 51.586943°N 2.793538°W

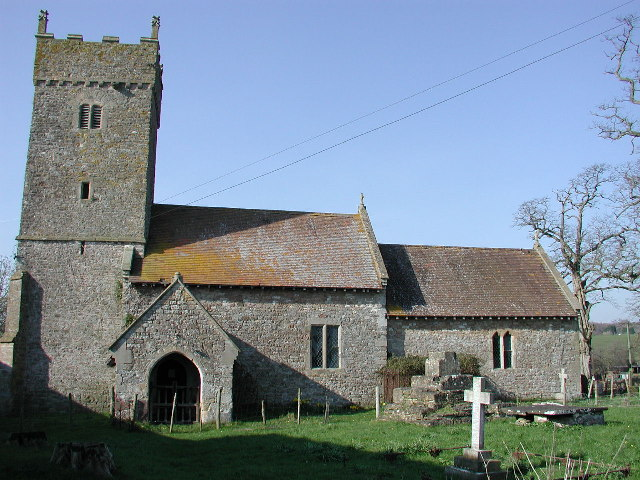
- St Michael and All Angels Church, Llanfihangel Rogiet, from the south

- Location in Monmouthshire
- OS grid reference: ST 456 876
- Location: Llanfihangel Rogiet, Monmouthshire
- Country: Wales
- Denomination: Church in Wales
- Website: Friends of Friendless Churches

Architecture
- Functional status: Redundant
- Heritage designation: Grade II*
- Designated: 19 August 1955
- Architectural type: Church
- Groundbreaking: 13th century

Specifications
- Materials: Stone rubble, some lias, Tiled roofs

St Michael and All Angels Church, Llanfihangel Rogiet, is a redundant church in the hamlet of Llanfihangel Rogiet near the village of Rogiet, Monmouthshire, Wales. It has been designated by Cadw as a Grade II* listed building and is under the care of the Friends of Friendless Churches. The church stands in a rural site between two farms, is near the Paddington-Swansea railway line, and close to the intersection of the M4 and M48 motorways. It can be approached only through a private farmyard.

== History ==
Most of the fabric of the church dates back to the 13th century, and the chancel was extended in the following century. The church was restored by the architect Henry Prothero of Cheltenham in 1904, the work being paid for by Lord Tredegar. The work carried out included rebuilding the north aisle. In doing this, two medieval effigies were found, one being that of Anne Martel, and the other possibly of her husband, John. Also at this time a squint between the aisle and the chancel was revealed. Henry Jones (1812-1891) was married in the church in 1826. In 1845, at his Bristol-based bakery, Jones perfected, and patented, the recipe for self-raising flour.

The church closed in 1973. It was acquired by the charity the Friends of Friendless Churches which holds a 999-year lease with effect from 30 July 2008. The charity has undertaken restoration work costing £50,000. The church reopened to the public in July 2010 with a harp concert. Management of the building has passed to the Caldicot and District Local History Society. In addition to opening the church during the summer months to visitors, it is planned to organise events and exhibitions. The single bell dates from the late 15th century, and is attributed to Robert Hendley of Gloucester.

== Architecture ==
The church is constructed mainly in rubble with ashlar dressings, the north aisle is in lias, and the roofs are tiled. The plan consists of a nave with a north aisle and a south porch, a chancel that is longer and has a lower roof than the nave, and a west tower. The tower is in three stages, with diagonal buttresses, and an embattled parapet with crocketted pinnacles. In the top stage are double louvred bell openings, beneath which are lancet windows. The interior is limewashed, the floor is stone-flagged, and it contains stone benches. In the north wall are the remnants of steps that formerly led to loft of the rood screen. The square font dates from the 12th century. The effigies are both in shallow relief. In the chancel is the probable effigy of John Martel, who is dressed in chain mail with a sword and a shield; in the north aisle is the effigy of Anne Martel, dated 1270, with her arms crossed in prayer and her feet resting on a lapdog. The church is a Grade II* listed building.

== Associated buildings ==
In the churchyard is a cross that is a scheduled monument (MM325). The church forms part of a group of buildings that includes a farmhouse and other farm buildings, and is approached through a working farm. The farmhouse, Old Court Farm, a range of farm buildings, and the farm stables have all been designated as Grade II listed buildings by Cadw.
