= Gloucester–Newport line =

UK railway line

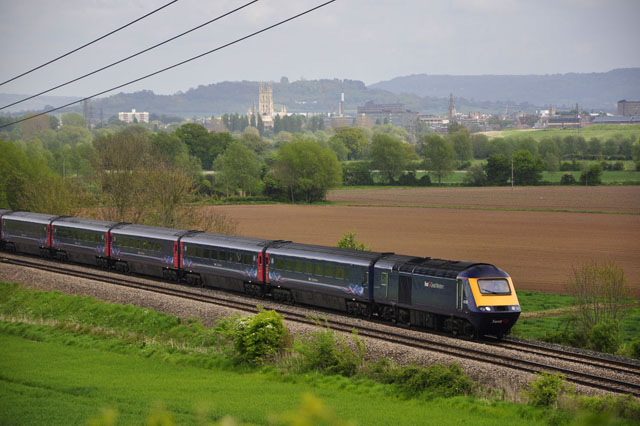
- A First Great Western InterCity 125 leaves Gloucester for South Wales

Overview
- Status: Operational
- Owner: Network Rail
- Locale: South East Wales, Severn Estuary, Monmouthshire, Gloucestershire
- Termini: Gloucester; Newport
- Stations: 6 (14 disused)

Service
- Type: Suburban rail, Heavy rail
- System: National Rail
- Operator(s): Transport for Wales; CrossCountry
- Rolling stock: Class 150 “Sprinter”; Class 153 “Super Sprinter”; Class 158 "Express Sprinter"; Class 170 "Turbostar"; Class 197 "Civity"

Technical
- Track gauge: 1,435 mm (4 ft 8 1/2 in) standard gauge
- Electrification: 25 kV 50 Hz AC OHLE (Newport-Severn Tunnel Junction)
Route map
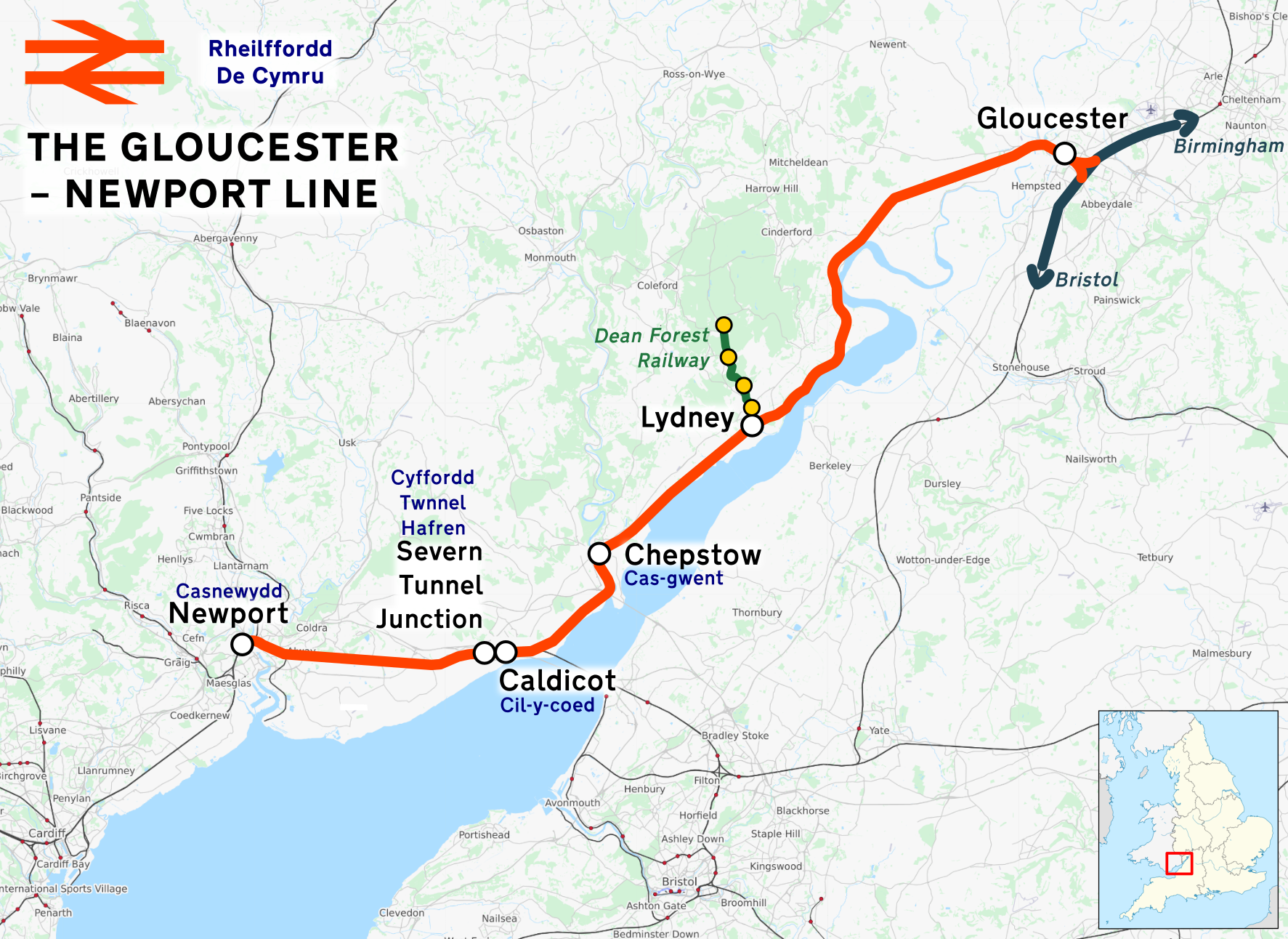
(Click to expand)

The Gloucester–Newport line is a railway line that runs along the west bank of the River Severn in the United Kingdom between Gloucester and Newport.

Originally part of the South Wales Railway on the main route from London before the construction of the Severn Tunnel; today it is an important link between the West Midlands and South Wales.

== Route ==
The places served by the route are:

- Gloucester
  - Connections along the Golden Valley line to Swindon
- Lydney
  - Connection with Dean Forest Railway
- Chepstow
- Caldicot
- Severn Tunnel Junction located in Rogiet
- Newport
  - Connections with South Wales Main Line and Welsh Marches line

Local passenger services are currently provided by Transport for Wales, with an approximately hourly service in each direction on the Cheltenham Spa to Maesteg service. These are supplemented by CrossCountry services between Cardiff Central and Nottingham, which serve Gloucester and Newport, serving either Lydney or Chepstow then fast to Newport for example. The intermediate stations are omitted except during the early morning and late evening.

Although Caldicot and Severn Tunnel Junction stations are only 3/4 mile (1.2 km) apart, Caldicot's growth as a dormitory for the new Llanwern steelworks kept it open in 1964 when other small stations were closed under The Reshaping of British Railways. Severn Tunnel Junction had important roles at this time as the junction for the Severn Tunnel, the large coal marshalling yards and a new diesel depot, replacing the previous steam locomotive depot. Severn Tunnel Junction also serves the village of Rogiet and is where this line merges with the South Wales Main Line through the Severn Tunnel, so it is also a stop on the Cardiff Central-Bristol Temple Meads-Taunton/Penzance service.

In 1977 the Parliamentary Select Committee on Nationalised Industries recommended considering electrification of more of Britain's rail network, and by 1979 BR presented a range of options to do so by 2000. Options included electrifying numerous former Great Western routes including the Gloucester to Newport line. Under the 1979–90 Conservative governments that succeeded the 1976–79 Labour government the proposal was not implemented.

== Accidents and incidents ==
- On 16 February 1880, a freight train was derailed when it was in collision with a large rock that had fallen onto the line 1.5 miles (2.4 km) south of Chepstow station, Monmouthshire.

== Sources ==
- Anonymous (Winter 1979). Railway Electrification. British Railways Board (Central Publicity Unit). pp. 0–2, 8.
- Hoole, Ken (1982). Trains in Trouble: Vol. 3. Redruth: Atlantic Books. ISBN 0-906899-05-2.
