= Severn (Caldicot ward) =

Coordinates: 51.587°N 2.741°W

- Electoral ward
- Location within Monmouthshire
- Population: 1,689 (2011 census)
- Community: Caldicot
- Principal area: Monmouthshire
- Country: Wales
- Sovereign state: United Kingdom
- UK Parliament: Newport East
- Senedd Cymru – Welsh Parliament: Newport East
- Councillors: 1 (County), 3 (Town)

Severn is an electoral ward in the town of Caldicot, Monmouthshire, Wales. The ward elects councillors to Caldicot Town Council and Monmouthshire County Council.

== Description ==
The Severn ward covers the southeast of the Caldicot community as far as the M4 motorway and estuary of the River Severn. The ward includes the Deepwier area of the town and the residential areas off Mill Lane. Caldicot's West End ward lies to the west and the Portskewett county ward borders to the east.

According to the 2011 UK Census the population of the Severn ward was 1,689.

== Town Council elections ==
Severn is a community ward for elections to Caldicot Town Council. The Severn ward elects or co-opts three town councillors to the town council .

A by-election took place on 20 May 2010 when long-standing Plaid Cymru town councillor, Joanne Daniels, was disqualified after failing to attend meetings for six months. She blamed this on her international work commitments. Labour Party candidate Alun Lloyd won the by-election by just 8 votes more than his Plaid Cymru rival.

== County Council elections ==
Severn is a county electoral ward for elections to Monmouthshire County Council. At the 1995 and 1999 elections the ward elected two Labour Party county councillors. From the 2004 elections representation was reduced to one councillor. This has been Cllr Jim Higginson, a steelworker and trade union official, who has represented the ward since 1999. Cllr Higginson was elected as chairman of the county council in May 2016.

2017 Monmouthshire County Council election
Party	Candidate	Votes	%	±%
Labour	Jim Higginson	209		
Independent	Jimmy Harris	152		
Conservative	Ian Herbert Standing	113		

== See also ==
- Caldicot Castle (electoral ward)
