= Wyedean School =

Wyedean School and Sixth Form Centre
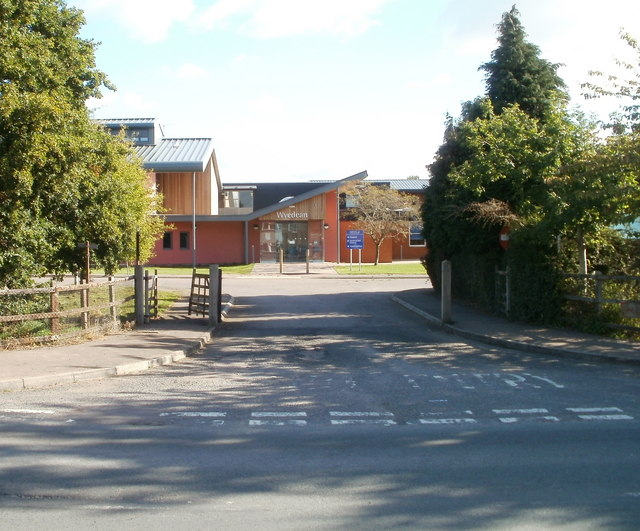

Location
- Beachley Road; Sedbury, Gloucestershire, NP16 7AA; England; 51°38′32″N 2°39′37″W

Information
- Type: Academy
- Motto: 'Aspire Together, Achieve Together'
- Established: 1973
- Specialist: Maths and Computing College
- Department for Education URN: 137382 Tables
- Ofsted: Reports
- Chair: Andy Lord
- Principal: Gwennan Jeremiah
- Gender: Coeducational
- Age: 11 to 18
- Enrolment: 1,250
- Website: http://www.wyedean.gloucs.sch.uk

Wyedean School and Sixth Form Centre is a secondary school with academy status in Sedbury, Gloucestershire, England, just across the border from Chepstow, Wales. Wyedean School was rated 'Good' by OfSTED in January 2018. The school is close to the A48 road and less than a mile from the Welsh border and as such, it accepts students from across the border.

Wyedean School is a mixed comprehensive school, with 1,100 students, including 300 in the Sixth Form. It was first set up in 1973 and was then moved in 1976 to its present location. The school is located in Gloucestershire, and falls within the English, not Welsh, education system. Although the majority of its students live in the Forest of Dean area of England, a significant number travel from within Wales.

It was also the school of J. K. Rowling, author of the Harry Potter series.

== Facilities ==
The school has a sports hall which can be rented in the evenings; a learning resource centre with IT facilities; a canteen, where hot and cold food can be purchased; a music suite, equipped with computers linked to recording equipment; and a Design Technology Block.

The Sixth Form block has been built to accommodate increased numbers of A-Level students. The Big Bean Café opened 2016, which allows students (including one apprenticeship) to learn how to become a barista.

Admittance to Wyedean School and Sixth Form Centre is non-denominational and Wyedean accepts both male and female students between the ages of 11 and 18.

Wyedean currently has around 1,100 students (02/2019).

== Staff ==
The Principal of Wyedean is Gwennan Jeremiah. Julie Smith is the Vice Principal (Academic) Jodie Howells is the Vice-Principal (Finance and Business) and Dai Thomas is the Vice-Principal (Pastoral).

== Sixth Form ==
The Sixth Form has two Head Boys and two Head Girls, known as 'The Team Leaders'. Every year a new set of team leaders is elected to represent the students, by the students. The Team Leaders also head a network of teams within the sixth form.

== Notable students ==
J. K. (Joanne) Rowling, author of the Harry Potter books, was Head Girl in 1982. Her mother, Anne Rowling, had worked there as a technician in the Science Department from 1978. During July 2006, the school library was dedicated to J. K. Rowling. Although she has made it clear that she did not always enjoy her time at Wyedean, citing teachers and loneliness, her website states that she and her sister "both loved their school days" there. She has stated that the character of Professor Snape was partly based on a chemistry teacher who taught at the school, understood to be John Nettleship. One of her teachers, Tim Ryan, has also said that he believes that other teachers were a direct influence on some of her characters. When she returned to the area in 2001 to film part of a biographical TV programme, she visited the nearby Tutshill Primary School but did not pay a visit to Wyedean.

Welsh actor Owain Yeoman, who stars in the US series, The Mentalist, was a student at Wyedean School, as was singer and songwriter Violet Skies.
