= St Mary's Church, Rogiet =

St Mary, Rogiet
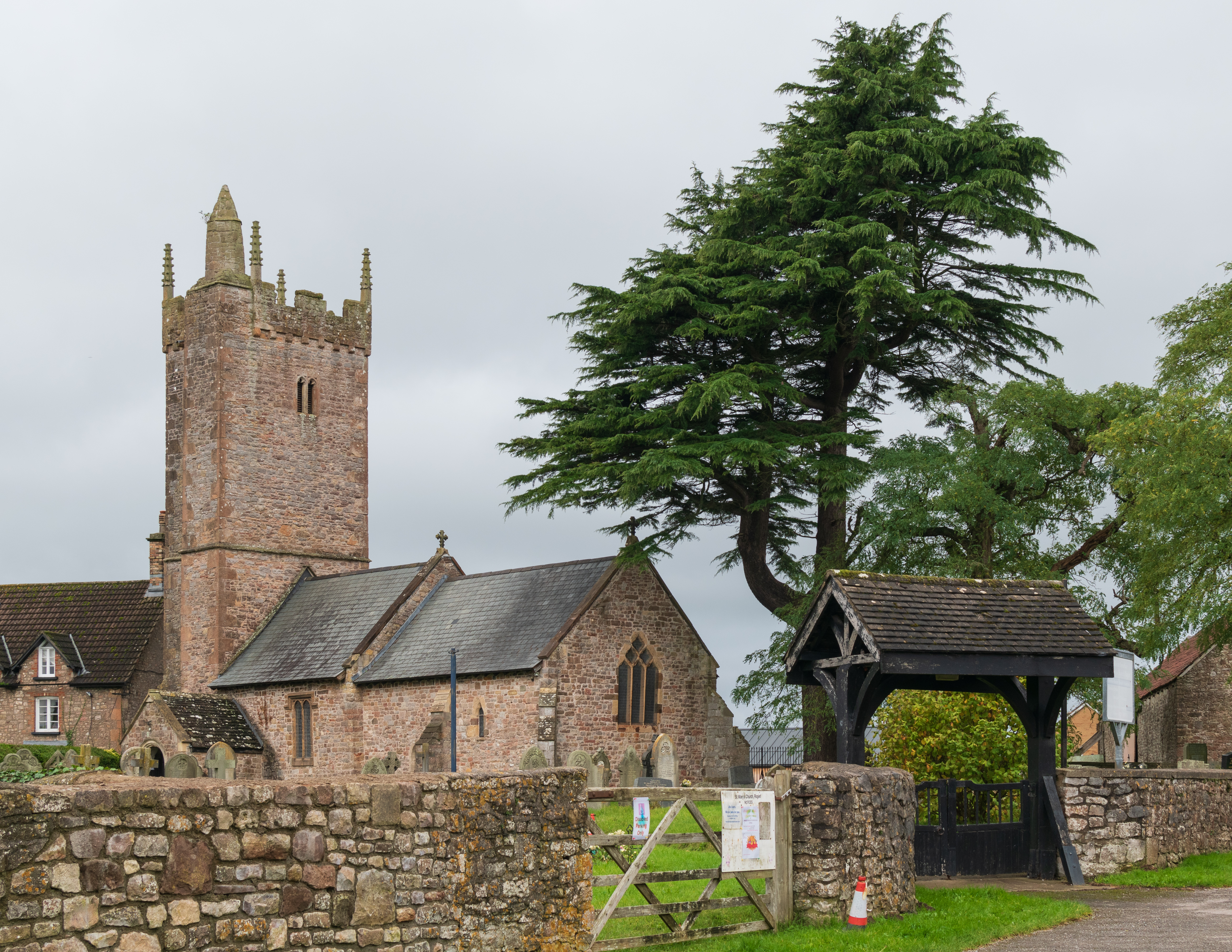
- St Mary's, Rogiet
- St Mary, Rogiet
- 51.5850°N 2.7857°W
- Location: Monmouthshire
- Country: Wales
- Denomination: Church in Wales

Administration
- Diocese: Monmouth

Clergy
- Vicar: Rev Dennis Richards

The Church of St Mary is the parish church of Rogiet, a small rural village on the Caldicot Levels, 8 miles west of Chepstow, Monmouthshire, Wales. It is a Grade II* listed building.

== History and architecture ==
The church dates from the thirteenth century, or possibly even earlier, with significant fourteenth century additions, including the tower, and later renovation and re-building in the late nineteenth and early twentieth centuries. The original dedication was to St Hilary, which may refer either to St Eleri or to St Hilary of Arles. The high tower, the short nave and lower chancel "create a memorable profile." It is built in "the Gothic Decorated style." The dressings of the windows and the tower are of Triassic stone. The tower has an external stair-turret, ending in an "odd, octagonal cap." The interior contains some notable stained glass.

In 2001 St. Mary's church became part of the newly established Rectorial Benefice of Caldicot, along with St. Mary's Church Caldicot and St. Mary's Church Portskewett. As of 2011, the church faced closure due to scarcity of parish funds.
