= Caldicot railway station =

Railway station in Monmouthshire, Wales

Caldicot Welsh: Cil-y-coed
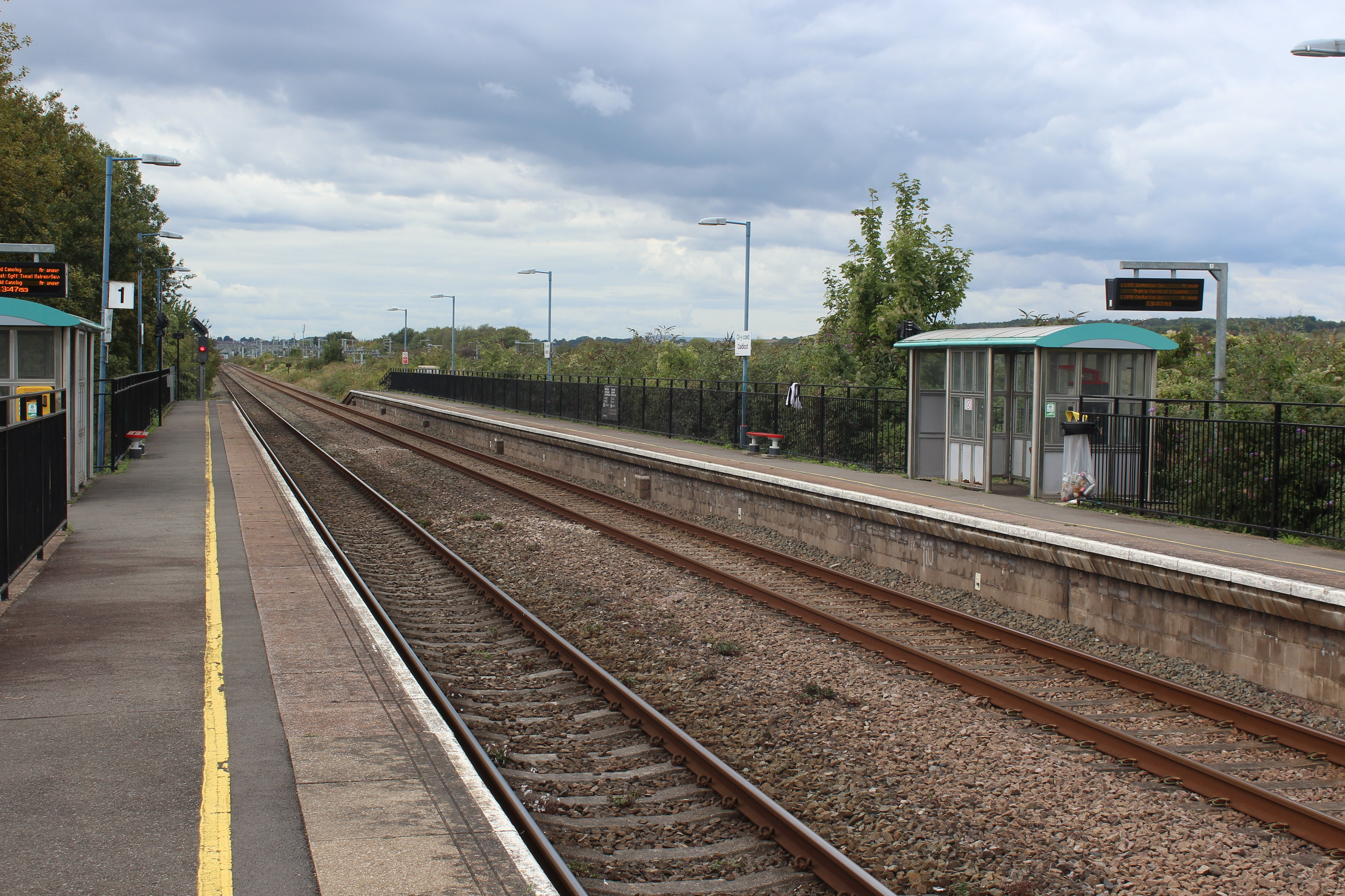

General information
- Location: Caldicot, Monmouthshire; Wales
- Coordinates: 51°35′04″N 2°45′35″W
- Grid reference: ST474875
- Managed by: Transport for Wales
- Platforms: 2

Other information
- Station code: CDT
- Classification: DfT category F2

Key dates
- 12 September 1932: Opened as Caldicot Halt
- 5 May 1969: Renamed Caldicot

Passengers
- 2020/21: ▼20,838
- 2021/22: ▲56,838
- 2022/23: ▲65,912
- 2023/24: ▲73,862
- 2024/25: ▲87,972
Location
Notes
- Passenger statistics from the Office of Rail and Road

Caldicot railway station is a part of the British railway system owned by Network Rail and is operated by Transport for Wales. It serves the town of Caldicot in Monmouthshire, Wales. It is located between Chepstow and the city of Newport on the Gloucester line, 148 miles 2 chains (238.2 km) from the zero point at Paddington, measured via Stroud. The line to Bristol via the Severn Tunnel runs just to the north but there are no platforms here; however, Severn Tunnel Junction station is within walking distance for those wanting to travel to Bristol.

== History ==
The railway line through Caldicot was built as the broad gauge South Wales Railway in 1850, although the nearest station was at Portskewett, two miles to the east. In 1861 a private siding was opened to serve the Caldicot Iron & Wire Works, from 1880 the Severn Tinplate Works, on what is now the industrial estate on the Sudbrook road, south of the castle. In typical broad gauge fashion, these works lines used two short hand-worked turntables to move wagons between the lines, rather than points.

In 1872, the South Wales Railway was re-gauged from broad gauge to standard gauge. By 1875 the wire works was also served by a level crossing and a crossover between the two running lines, controlled by a signal box. It is likely that this relaying was carried out earlier, as part of the re-gauging work.

In 1878, a branch line was laid to Sudbrook, to support the works for construction of the new Severn Tunnel. One of the main tasks of this line was to deliver coal for the pumping engines needed to drain the tunnel workings. Even after the long-delayed tunnel opened in 1886, on the South Wales Main Line, this coal traffic remained the major reason for keeping this branch in service. By 1925, the busier traffic on the main line had led to an expansion of the junction with a head siding. Further sidings were provided to the north of the running lines, on the town side. These were well to the east of where the station is today.

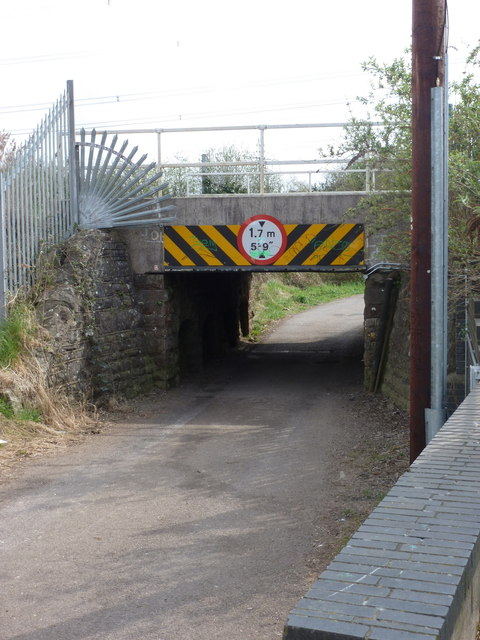
The low underpass to the Newport platform

Caldicot station opened as a passenger halt on 12 September 1932. The road serving the station had been here for many years beforehand, since the building of the tunnel. It crosses the low tunnel line by an overbridge, then passes under the Gloucester line by an unusually low underpass. This underpass was originally provided to give farm access to the land of the Caldicot Levels south of the railway and it is a mark of the passenger station's minor importance that such a restricted access continues to this day.

In 1939, construction began on the Royal Navy Propellant Factory, Caerwent. A second branch was laid from Caldicot, this time to the north east. The private siding agreements are first made in the name of the builders McAlpine, then the United States Army Air Forces from 1943, and only transferred to the Ministry of Defence as the Royal Navy in 1944. To support the increased traffic, a second crossover was constructed, together with a loop siding on the Down line.

Although production at the propellant factory ceased in the 1960s, it remained an important storage depot for munitions until 1993. The branch remains in service to this day, although little used and mostly just as a storage area for railway vehicles awaiting scrapping. Most military use of the site, now as a training area, is handled by road, not rail.

The original tinplate works sidings and the sidings serving the town were also taken out of use in the 1960s. Owing to later building work, no trace remains. The Sudbrook branch remains, although it is overgrown and no longer immediately usable.

== Facilities ==
Caldicot station is on the southern edge of the town, reached by Station Road, a turnoff from Newport Road (B4245), the main road through the town, which crosses over the approach to the Severn Tunnel. The station consists of two short platforms, each with a bus stop style shelter with seats inside. Sloping ramps make wheeled access to both platforms feasible. To reach the platform for trains to Newport/Cardiff, a low bridge beneath the tracks must be passed under.

The station is unstaffed apart from occasional Saturday mornings or when major events occur at the Millennium Stadium, Cardiff, when a guard may be on duty for the purpose of selling tickets.

Recorded information, not always up to date, can be obtained via a push button customer help point located outside the station precincts. Digital CIS displays are also provided to offer train running details.

The nearest bus stop is a five-minute walk away, where connections can be made for destinations along the bus route between Caldicot, Chepstow and Newport.

There is no adjacent car parking but there is a local social club with a car park not far away.

== Services ==
Although numerous trains pass through the station, the service is somewhat sporadic, as only TfW local trains between Cheltenham Spa and Cardiff Central/Maesteg and a small amount of CrossCountry trains call here. The frequency for trains between Cheltenham Spa and Maesteg varies between hourly & two hourly on weekdays and Saturdays and runs every two hours on Sunday from mid-morning. There are also a small amount of CrossCountry trains between Nottingham or Birmingham New Street and Cardiff Central that call here on Mondays to Saturdays only, during the morning and night.

Preceding station	National Rail	Following station
Severn Tunnel Junction	Transport for Wales; Maesteg / Cardiff Central – Cheltenham Spa	Chepstow
Severn Tunnel Junction	CrossCountry; Cardiff Central – Birmingham New Street / Nottingham (Mondays to Saturdays only)	Chepstow
