= John Nettleship =

British schoolteacher (1939–2011)

- Born: 1 August 1939; Nottingham, England
- Died: 12 March 2011 (aged 71)
- Occupation: Head of Science
- Known for: Inspiring the character of Severus Snape

Academic background
- Education: University of Leeds

Academic work
- Discipline: Chemistry
- Institutions: Wyedean School
- Notable students: J. K. Rowling

John Lawrence Nettleship (1 August 1939 – 12 March 2011) was a British schoolteacher who taught chemistry and served as the Head of Science at Wyedean School, Gloucestershire. One of his many pupils was J. K. Rowling, and Nettleship has been stated to be a major inspiration for Rowling's character of Severus Snape in Rowling's Harry Potter series of fantasy novels.

== Early life ==
Nettleship was born in Nottingham, England, on 1 August 1939. He was the son of Albert Victor Nettleship and Lilian Slack. He studied chemistry at the University of Leeds in the late 1950s. He joined the Labour Party at that time, and remained an active member for the rest of his life.

== Career ==
After graduating university, Nettleship taught in Birmingham, where he married and had three children; the marriage later ended in divorce and he remarried in the 1980s. In 1970, he began teaching at Caldicot School in Monmouthshire, Wales.

In 1974, Nettleship moved a few miles away in Sedbury, Gloucestershire to become Head of Science at Wyedean School. There, Nettleship taught a teenage J.K. Rowling chemistry and employed Rowling's mother Anne as an assistant at the school.

In the late 1990s, as the Harry Potter series gained international recognition, Nettleship was often recognized as a personal character inspiration for Severus Snape. He described himself in hindsight as "a short-tempered chemistry teacher with long hair...[and a] gloomy, malodorous laboratory." He was first questioned about his links to Rowling's character by journalists, saying: "I was horrified when I first found out. I knew I was a strict teacher but I didn't think I was that bad." While initially upset with the connection, Nettleship eventually accepted it. "Quite a lot of my ex-pupils recognise the original character when they see the film," he stated. "They come to me and say, ‘We saw you in the movie, sir’. But I just laugh about that. The great thing though is that Alan Rickman was picked to play the character and the ladies think he is good. That made things better." He wrote a short book, Harry Potter's Chepstow, about Rowling's connections with Chepstow. He also gave talks on the connections that the Chepstow, Wye Valley, and Forest of Dean areas had with the Harry Potter books.

Nettleship retired in 1997. As well as being an active member of the Labour Party, he was a member of Caerwent community council, serving as its chairman in 1991. He was instrumental in setting up Caerwent Historic Trust, becoming its secretary and researching the history of the area.

He died of cancer on 12 March 2011, aged 71, after having been diagnosed in 2006. A spokeswoman for J. K. Rowling said that the author was sorry to hear of his death.

He was played by Andrew Kavadas in the J.K. Rowling biopic Magic Beyond Words.
