= Severn Tunnel Junction railway station =

Railway station in Rogiet, Wales

Severn Tunnel Junction Welsh: Cyffordd Twnnel Hafren
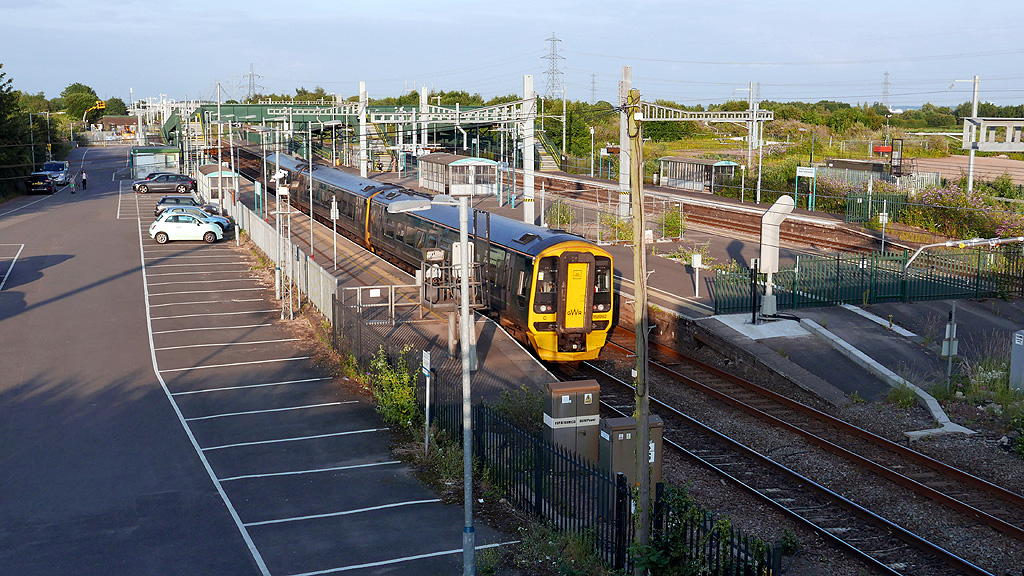
- Severn Tunnel Junction station in July 2019

General information
- Location: Rogiet, Monmouthshire; Wales
- Coordinates: 51.5842°N 2.7771°W
- Grid reference: ST462875
- Manager: Transport for Wales
- Platforms: 4

Other information
- Station code: STJ
- Classification: DfT category E

History
- Original company: Great Western Railway
- Pre-grouping: Great Western Railway
- Post-grouping: Great Western Railway

Key dates
- 1 December 1886: Station opened

Passengers
- 2020/21: ▼34,882
- Interchange: ▼6,024
- 2021/22: ▲0.117 million
- Interchange: ▲19,906
- 2022/23: ▲0.166 million
- Interchange: ▲28,689
- 2023/24: ▲0.191 million
- Interchange: ▲29,242
- 2024/25: ▲0.213 million
- Interchange: ▲33,770
Location
Notes
- Passenger statistics from the Office of Rail and Road

Severn Tunnel Junction railway station (Welsh: Cyffordd Twnnel Hafren) is a minor station on the western side of the Severn Tunnel in the village of Rogiet, Monmouthshire, Wales. It is 123.5 miles (198.8 km) from London Paddington and lies at the junction of the South Wales Main Line from London and the Gloucester to Newport Line.

The next station to the west is Newport. The next stations to the east are at Pilning in South Gloucestershire (through the Severn Tunnel) and nearby Caldicot (on the Gloucester line).

== History ==
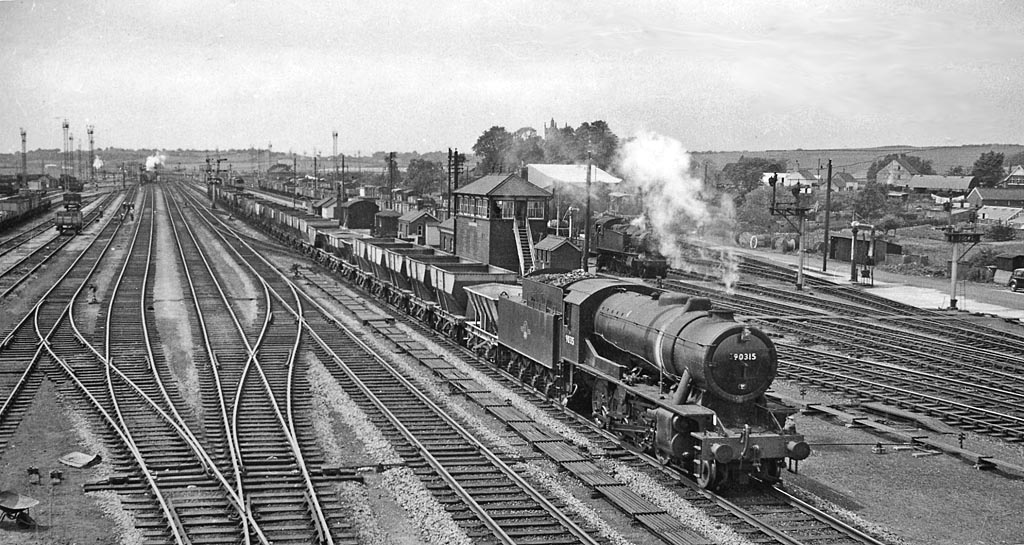
Severn Tunnel Junction Up (Eastbound) main line in 1961

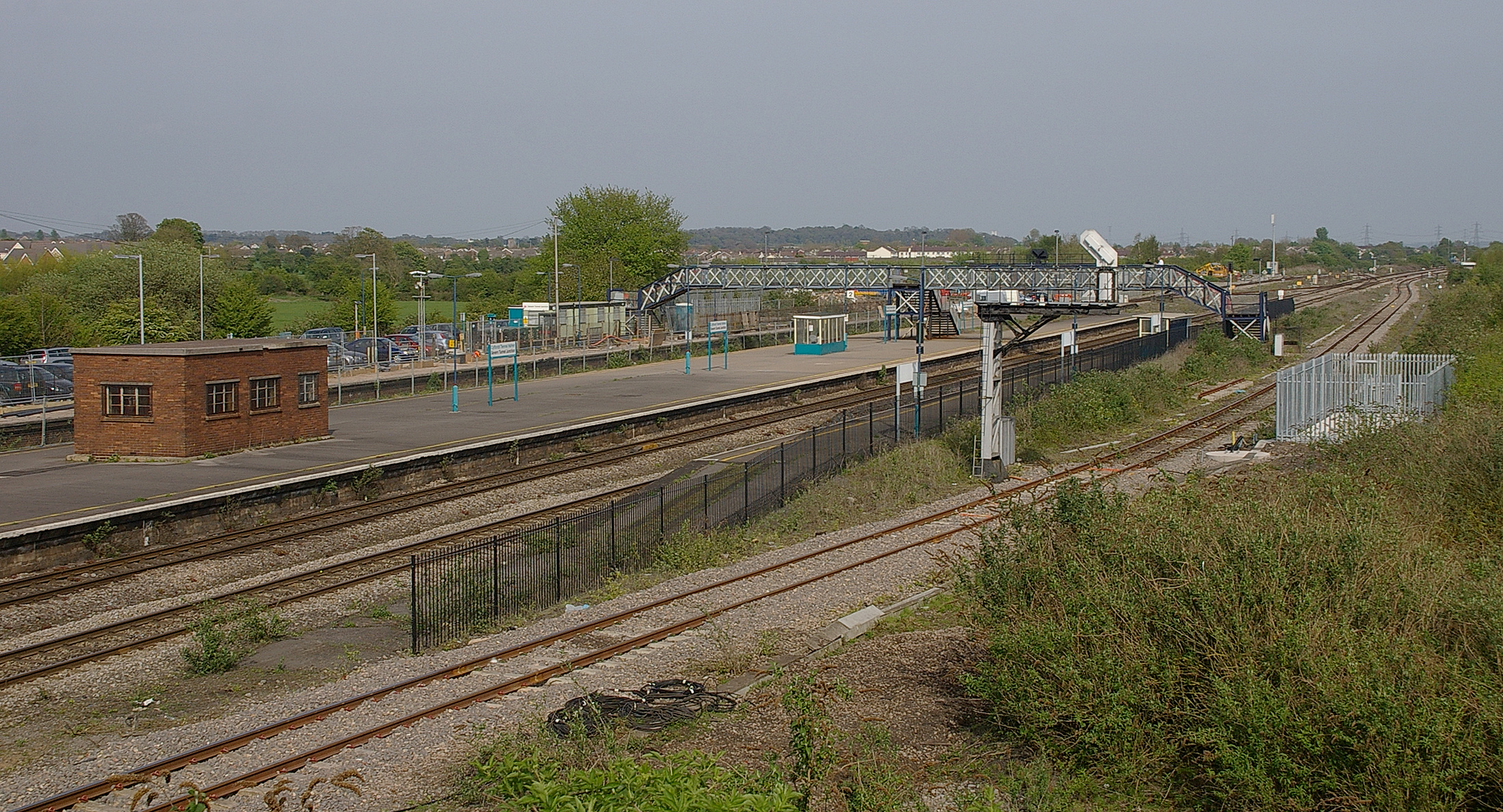
Severn Tunnel Junction station in April 2009, before the restoration of a fourth line and platform in January 2010

The South Wales Main Line was opened through the village of Rogiet in 1850. At this time Rogiet was little more than a church and a farm, and the expansion of the village did not begin until after the opening of the station in 1886.

During construction of the Severn Tunnel, several maps were printed that labelled the new junction as Rogiet Station, although the station was always named Severn Tunnel Junction from the time that it opened to the public on 1 December 1886.

The junction system consisted of a five-platform station (four through, and an up facing bay), a railway depot, and a major marshalling yard. The purpose of the yard was to sort coal coming from the South Wales Coalfield to London and the Midlands; while in reverse, it sorted goods in transit from the rest of the UK to South Wales.

The area was bombed during World War II, due to the large goods yard facility, its location on strategic rail routes and its proximity to other target areas such as Bristol and Cardiff. From 1924 to 1966 Severn Tunnel Junction was the terminus of a car transport service through the tunnel to Pilning. The service was made redundant by the opening of the Severn Bridge in 1966.

As a result of reduced coal and industrial production from the mid-1980s from South Wales, and increases in fixed goods formations, Severn Tunnel Junction goods yard and locomotive depot were closed from 12 October 1987 with residual marshalling moving to Newport railway station.

From 2010, Network Rail remodelled the track layout, which in conjunction with resignalling work was due to be completed by 2014. The plan provided improved operational flexibility, reduce maintenance costs and re-instated a fourth through platform. SEWTA invested in improved passenger facilities at the station. The new track layout came into operation on 4 January 2010, with the South Wales Main Line now using platforms 3 and 4, and Gloucester to Newport Line platforms 1 and 2. There are no rail connections between the platforms east of the station as high-speed 70 miles per hour (110 km/h) crossovers have been provided to the west.

As with other parts of the Great Western Main Line electrification, the road bridge and footbridge were replaced, with additional clearance above the overhead lines, and with raised and solid parapets to the bridges to prevent vandalism of the equipment.

== Facilities ==
The station previously had a privately operated ticket office.

== Services ==
The station is served by two main routes - the Transport for Wales Cheltenham Spa to Cardiff Central and Maesteg via Chepstow local service and Great Western Railway's Cardiff to Taunton via Bristol line. Both run hourly on weekdays and Saturdays, albeit with some two-hour gaps on the Chepstow line. In the weekday peaks, certain Cardiff to Portsmouth Harbour services also stop here, whilst there is a daily train to Fishguard Harbour. CrossCountry also provides very limited services to/from Nottingham via Gloucester and Birmingham New Street.

On Sundays, the Bristol to Cardiff service is once again hourly (and runs to/from Portsmouth) whist the Cheltenham service is two-hourly.

In December 2022, the ORR approved Grand Union to commence a new service from Paddington to Carmarthen in partnership with Spanish rail operator Renfe, for which a fleet of new bi-mode trains will be used. The new service is scheduled to commence in December 2024. The service will call at Bristol Parkway, Severn Tunnel Junction, Newport, Cardiff Central, Gowerton and Llanelli en-route to Carmarthen, and will provide Severn Tunnel Junction with direct trains to London, which currently do not call. In December 2024, following FirstGroup's acquisition of Grand Union Trains, it was announced the proposed London Paddington to Carmarthen service would be operated by Lumo.

Preceding station	National Rail	Following station
Newport	Transport for Wales; Maesteg / Cardiff Central - Cheltenham Spa	Caldicot
Newport	CrossCountry; Cardiff Central - Nottingham (Mondays to Saturdays only, limited service)	Caldicot
Newport	Great Western Railway; Cardiff Central - Taunton	Patchway or Pilning
	Future services	
Newport	Lumo; London - Carmarthen	Bristol Parkway

== See also ==
- List of all UK railway stations
- Severn Tunnel rail accident, 1991

== Bibliography ==
- Hodge, John (2002). The South Wales Main Line. Vol. Part Two: Severn Tunnel to Newport. Wild Swan Publications. ISBN 1-874103-76-3.
- Marshall, Geoff; Pipe, Vicki (2018). The Railway Adventures: Places, Trains, People and Stations. September Publishing. ISBN 978-1910463871.
- Rendall, P D (2020) [2020]. The Severn Tunnel Junction. Marlborough: The Crowood Press. ISBN 978-1785007378.
- Rhodes, Michael (1988). "4: South Wales: Severn Tunnel Junction". British Marshalling Yards. Oxford Publishing. pp. 65–78. ISBN 0-86093-367-9.
- Rhodes, Michael (1988). The illustrated history of British Marshalling Yards. OPC. ISBN 0860933679.
- Walker, Thomas A. (2004) [1888]. The Severn Tunnel. Stroud: Nonsuch Publishing. ISBN 1-84588-000-5.
