= Rogiet =

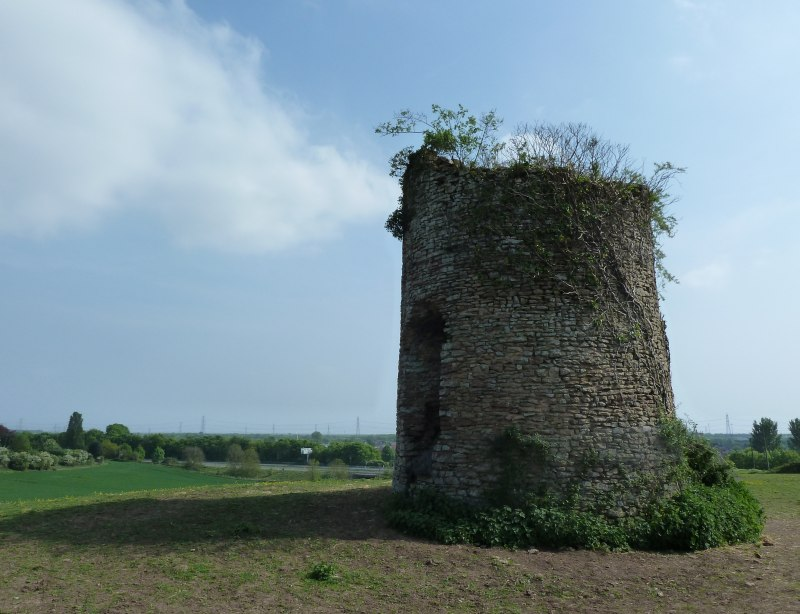
- Rogiet's ruined windmill

- Location within Monmouthshire
- Population: 1,813 (2011)
- OS grid reference: ST458877
- Community: Rogiet
- Principal area: Monmouthshire
- Preserved county: Gwent
- Country: Wales
- Sovereign state: United Kingdom
- Post town: CALDICOT
- Postcode district: NP26
- Dialling code: 01291
- Police: Gwent
- Fire: South Wales
- Ambulance: Welsh
- UK Parliament: Monmouthshire
- Senedd Cymru – Welsh Parliament: Newport East
- List of places UK Wales Monmouthshire 51.589°N 2.787°W Map of the community

Rogiet (English: /ˈrɒɡɪt/; Welsh: Rhosied) is a small village and community (and electoral ward) in Monmouthshire, south east Wales, between Caldicot and Magor, 8 miles (13 km) west of Chepstow and 11 miles (18 km) east of Newport, which covers an area of 847 hectares (3.27 mi^{2}). It lies close to the M4 and M48 motorways, and the Second Severn Crossing. It is adjacent to the main railway line into South Wales, and has a railway station named Severn Tunnel Junction. Rogiet had a population of 1,813 in the 2011 census.

In the village is Rogiet Primary School, a 210-place school for pupils aged between 4 and 11 years. The school moved to a new, eco-friendly building in November 2009.

== History ==
The village adjoins the Caldicot Levels. Its name is of uncertain derivation, and was formerly spelled Roggiatt, Roggiett or Roggiet. The first known lord of the manor was Godfrey de Gamage, who married Joan, the daughter of Richard de Clare, Earl of Pembroke, known as "Strongbow", in the 12th century.

The Church of St Mary, Rogiet is the parish church, which in earlier centuries was dedicated to St. Hilary. Much of the church dates from about the 14th century, and it was restored in the 19th and early 20th centuries.

=== Arrival of the railway ===
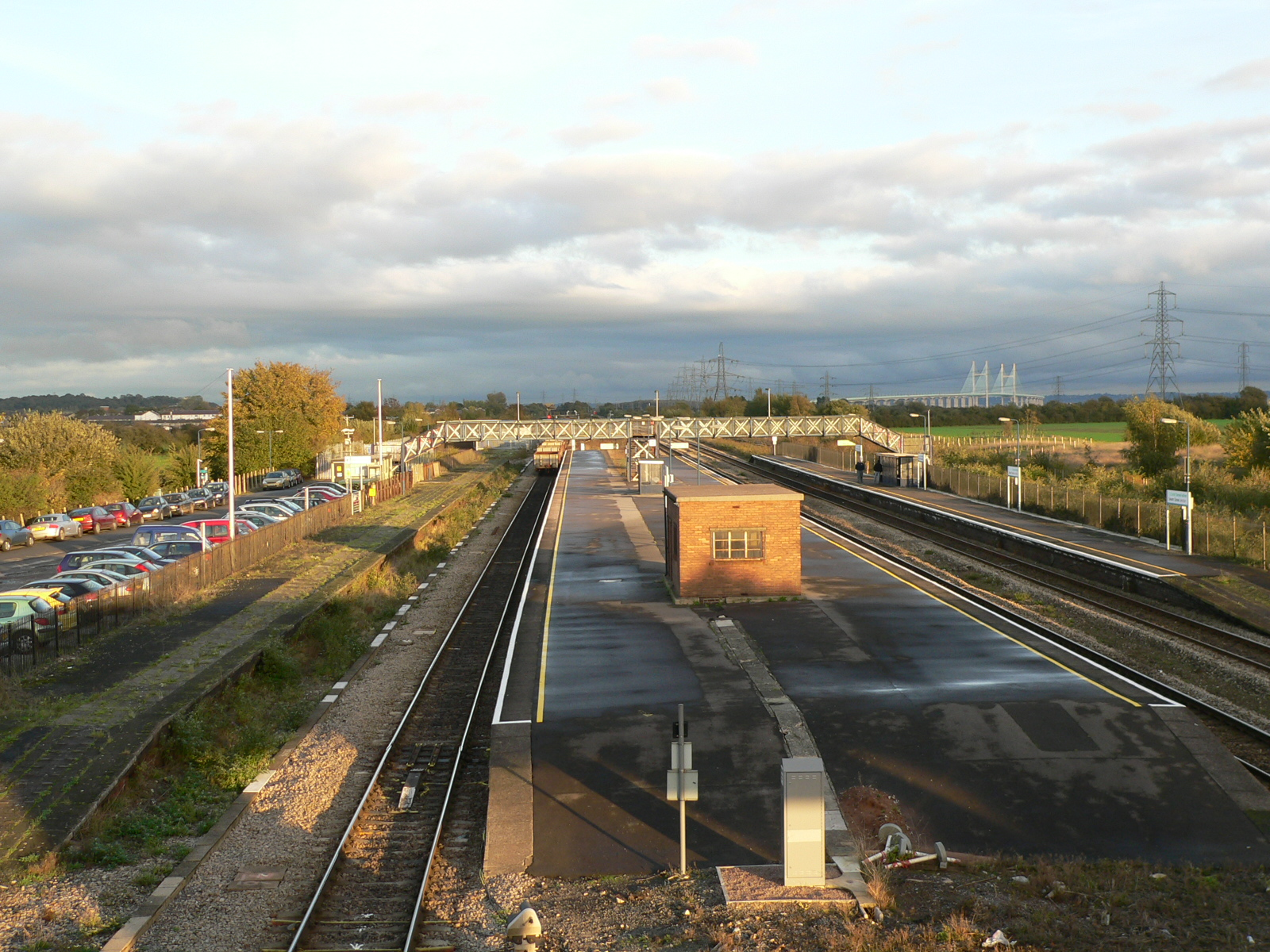
Severn Tunnel Junction station at Rogiet

The South Wales Railway, now the Gloucester to Newport line, was opened through Rogiet in 1850, although the nearest station was two miles away, at Portskewett.

A junction station was built at Rogiet to serve the new Severn Tunnel, that opened in 1886. This Severn Tunnel Junction station was in operation for tunnel works traffic by 1883 and as a functional station by 1885 although it is unclear if it was open to the public at this date, before the official opening of the tunnel in 1886. The sidings of the new station were built on the Caldicot Levels, using spoil excavated from the cutting into the tunnel. The name 'Rogiet Station' appears on several contemporary maps, although these are always in conjunction with a planned station, as the junction for the new tunnel line. There is no evidence for a station before this date, or for a constructed station ever having been called 'Rogiet Station'.

The station developed an importance out of all proportion to the size of the village, owing to the South Wales coal traffic and the large marshalling yard, the largest and most important on the GWR. This in turn required engine sheds of proportionate size, housing around 70 engines in 1939.

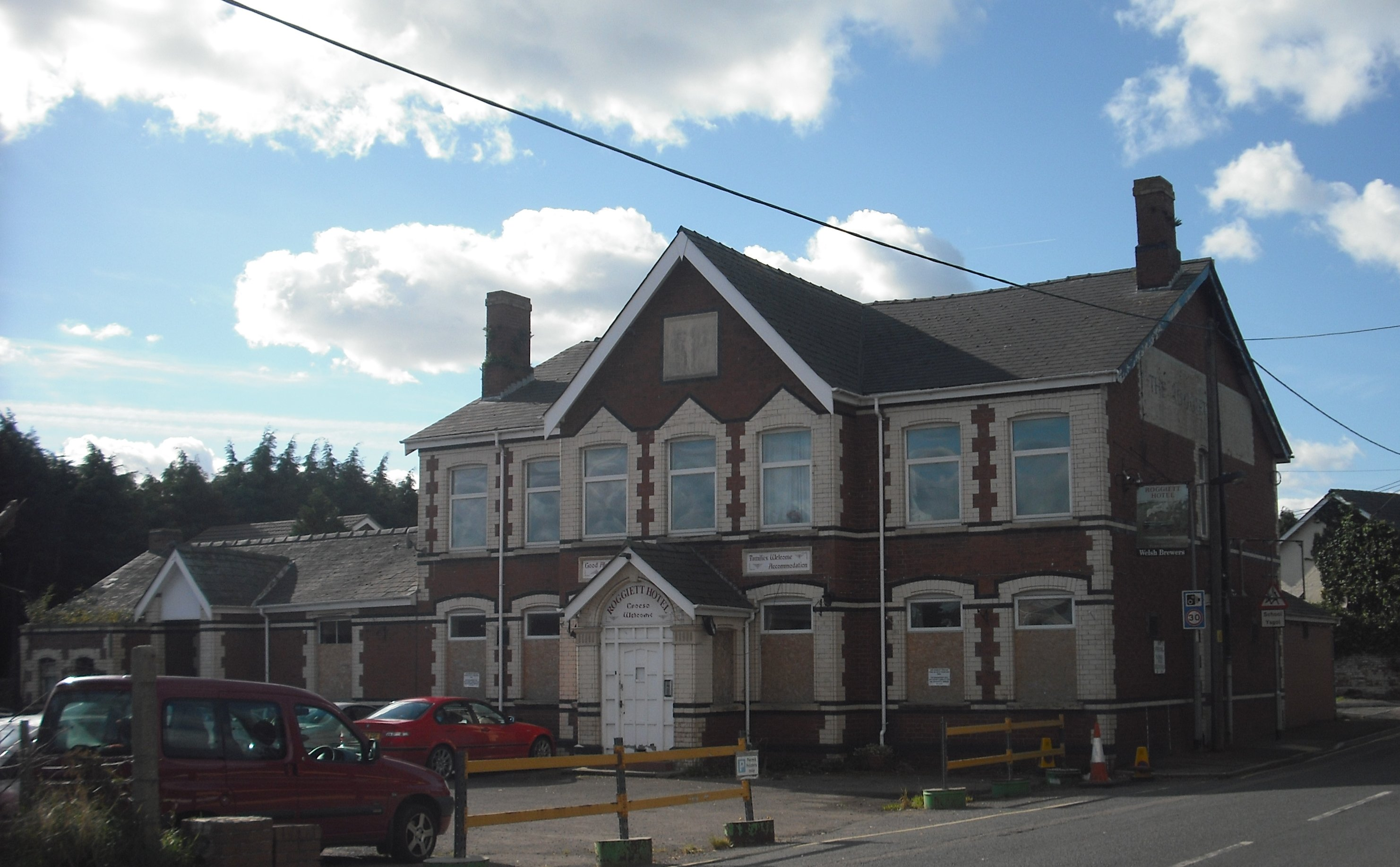
Roggiett Hotel

The presence of the station became a catalyst for the growth of the village. The censuses of 1851, 1861 & 1871 show the main employment to be agricultural, with a few working in the limestone quarries at Ifton, but no railway workers. The parish population increased from 84 in 1881 to 122 in 1891. The first new building was the construction of red-brick bookend terraces: Ifton Terrace, Railway Terrace and Seaview Terrace, all still extant today. These were followed by the village's only building of note, other than the church, its only pub the Roggiett Hotel. This was a relatively large pub for such a small village, and operated as an active hotel, mostly serving the farming trade at the cattle market. It has been closed since 2008, leaving the village without a pub. A school was also built and by 1891 a post office had opened.

A major phase of housing expansion took place after World War I, increasing by three times to World War II. Half of this growth, 94 houses, was due to the Severn Tunnel Garden Village Society, constituted in 1924, whose membership was limited to railwaymen. Population increased from 136 in 1921 to 234 in the 1931 census. Many railwaymen still commuted from the other local villages though, and over a thousand worked at Severn Tunnel Junction by the outbreak of World War II.

=== Decline of the railway ===
The rapid rate of growth decreased after the war, and population only increased from 1,137 in 1951 to 1,347 in 1971. This was particularly affected by the withdrawal of steam power on the railway in the 1960s, and the resultant reduction in the staff needed at the locomotive sheds. Some of the younger railwaymen found employment at the expanding Llanwern steelworks. Many of the older railwaymen retired, encouraged by security of tenancy for the desirable Garden Village housing. This gave Rogiet a population in 1966 that consisted of 40% retirees, with an unusually elderly population in the 1960s and 1970s, leading in turn to a low provision of schools and other amenities, although a thriving allotment society continues to this day. The local birthrate fell by over 50% in the 15 years from 1946 to the 1961 census.

The village underwent major expansion in the later 20th century, following the development of nearby Caldicot, Undy and Magor as dormitory villages. With the development of the Severn Bridges, the number of commuters by road to Bristol also increased.

The land occupied by half of the old marshalling yard, to the West of the road across it, is now a countryside park.

== Demographics ==
Rogiet community's population was 1,813, according to the 2011 census; an 11.91% increase since the 1,620 people noted in 2001.

The 2011 census showed 15.6% of the population could speak Welsh, the highest percentage in Monmouthshire, a rise from 10.7% in 2001.

== Governance ==
Rogiet is also the name of the electoral ward, coterminous with the community, which elects a county councillor to Monmouthshire County Council.

Since 2008 the ward has been represented by Liberal Democrat, Linda Guppy. Her father, Gerald Robbins, had been an independent county councillor for Rogiet until the 2004 elections. Between 2004 and 2008 the ward was represented by the Labour Party.

Until the 2023 Periodic Review of Westminster constituencies, Rogiet fell entirely within the Newport East constituency, and was represented by Jessica Morden. Following the boundary changes, Rogiet now falls entirely within the Monmouthshire constituency, and is represented by Catherine Fookes.

== Rogiet Hoard ==
In 1998, a large hoard of Roman coins was found which became known as the Rogiet Hoard.

== Llanfihangel Rogiet ==
The hamlet and separate parish of Llanfihangel Rogiet (Welsh: Llanfihangel Rhosied) is located immediately west of Rogiet itself, and derives its name from the Welsh name for the church of St. Michael (Llan-f/mihangel). In about 905 there was a dispute between the households of Cyfeilliog, the Bishop of Ergyng and Brochfael ap Meurig, joint king of Gwent. Cyfeilliog was awarded compensation in gold, but Brochfael was unable to pay in this form and instead paid with land at Llanfihangel. The current Church of St Michael and All Angels again dates from about the 14th century, with much later rebuilding, and contains medieval tombs. Unlike Rogiet, Llanfihangel has remained relatively untouched by modern development.

== Ifton ==
The land immediately east of Rogiet once formed the separate small parish of Ifton. Some Roman pottery was discovered at Ifton Manor. The church was pulled down in 1755.
