= Caldicot Castle =

- Castell Cil-y-coed
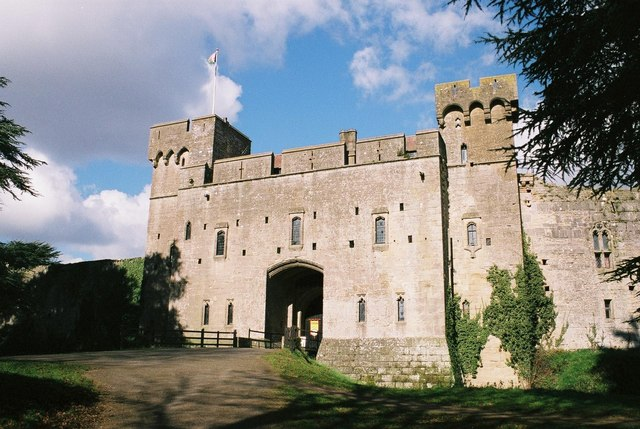
- The front entrance through the gatehouse

- Location within Monmouthshire
- Established: 1100
- Location: Caldicot, Monmouthshire, Wales
- Coordinates: 51.59305°N 2.74237°W
- Type: Historic house museum
- Website: Caldicot Castle

Caldicot Castle (Welsh: Castell Cil-y-coed) is an extensive stone medieval castle in the town of Caldicot, Monmouthshire, in southeast Wales, built near the site of Harold Godwinson's former Saxon castle by the Norman earls of Hereford from about 1100. The castle became a Grade I listed building on 10 June 1953.

It was in the possession of Thomas of Woodstock, a son of King Edward III of England, until his death in 1391, when it reverted to the Crown.

== Caldicot Estate ==
Caldicot is mentioned in the Domesday Book of 1086, not for its castle, but as an agricultural holding of Durand of Gloucester, Sheriff of Gloucestershire. Walter FitzRoger, Durand's nephew, inherited his lands as well as his father's office of Constable of England which remained with the lords of Caldicot. Walter's son Milo was granted the Earldom of Hereford to add to his titles. In the time of Henry I of England the castle was probably a simple motte-and-bailey.

== Bohun family ==
Milo's five sons died childless so his eldest daughter, Margaret, took to her marriage with Humphrey II de Bohun the Earldom of Hereford, the Constableship of England, and Caldicot. Their son Humphrey III de Bohun was the probable builder, in about 1170, of the stone keep and curtain walls of the present-day castle. The Bohun family held the manor and castle of Caldicot for more than two centuries, over eight generations.

== Thomas of Woodstock ==
In 1376 the manor, along with 70 others, passed to Thomas of Woodstock, the fifth son of King Edward III of England, when he married Alianore de Bohun.

On the death of Edward III the throne passed to his grandson, the nine-year-old Richard II. As the new king's uncle, Thomas played an important role advising him. He was appointed Constable of England. He rarely visited Caldicot, his main estates being at Pleshey in Essex, close to the seat of power.

In 1381, however, Essex was convulsed by the Peasants' Revolt. This may be why Thomas decided to spend part of that year in Caldicot. During his stay he gave orders for major new work to be done on the castle. A new gatehouse and drawbridge were constructed. At the rear of the castle a dovecote was replaced by a new tower with private chambers, now known as the Woodstock tower. At the foot of the Woodstock tower two carved stones were to be placed, one marked 'Thomas' the other 'Alianore'.

As time passed relations between Thomas and King Richard grew increasingly strained. In 1397, on the orders of the king, Thomas was kidnapped and murdered. His property was confiscated and passed into the hands of the Crown.

== House of Lancaster ==
In 1399 Henry Bolingbroke seized the throne from Richard, and although Mary de Bohun did not live to see her husband crowned Henry IV, her son, born at Monmouth Castle, would be one of the country's great heroes, Henry V, victor of Agincourt.

The division of the de Bohuns estates was revised after the death of Alianore and Mary de Bohun's mother Joan, who had outlived both of her daughters by some twenty years. Alianore's eldest daughter and heir, Anne, lost Caldicot to Mary's son King Henry V, and so Caldicot became part of the great Duchy of Lancaster. Held by Henry's widow, Katherine of Valois, Caldicot was later granted into the stewardship of the Herbert family for much of the fifteenth century, and then leased in the sixteenth century to their successors the Somersets with their power base at Raglan.

== Decline, neglect and restoration ==
Caldicot Castle was evidently neglected, fell into ruin and became little more than a farmyard. The castle was sold to Charles Lewis of St Pierre in 1857. In 1885 he sold it to Joseph Richard Cobb, who began the restoration of the castle as his family home.

From 1885 to 1964, the Cobb family owned the castle. Joseph Cobb's family remained at the castle after his death and it was his son Geoffry Wheatly Cobb, and in particular his daughter-in-law Anna, who continued the work of restoration. In the early twentieth century, many rooms were decorated with memorabilia from Nelson's first flagship, HMS Foudroyant which was owned by Geoffry Wheatly Cobb at the end of its life. G. W. Cobb died in 1931 and, after Anna's death in 1943, the castle passed to Joseph's grandson, Geoffry Richard Wheatly Cobb who created furnished apartments for renting in three of the towers and also in parts of the gatehouse.

In 1964, Chepstow Rural District Council bought the castle from the Cobb family for £12,000, at a time when the increasing availability of council housing had supplanted the local need for the castle apartments. The building, including a small museum, was opened to the public in 1965. After 1967, medieval-style banquets were held there.

== Gallery ==
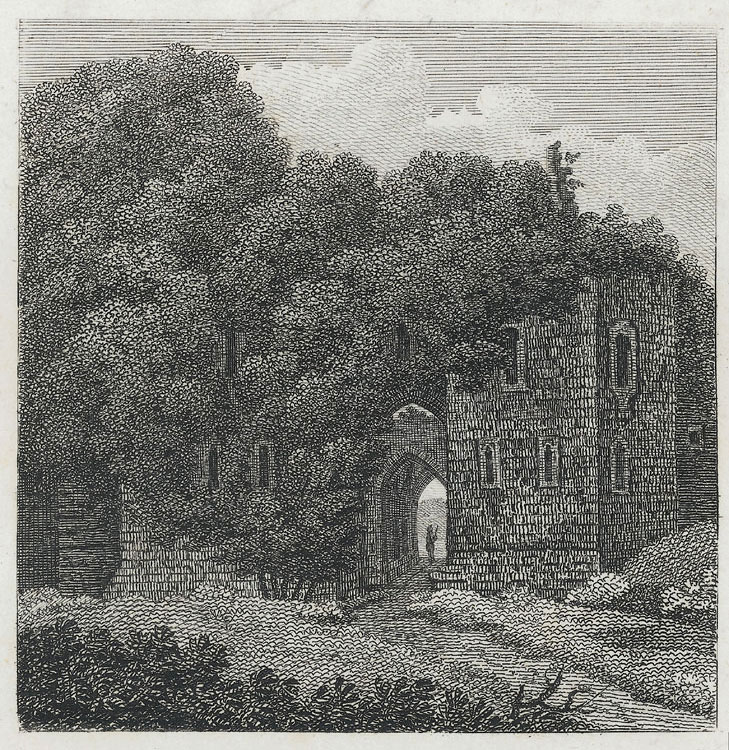
Caldicot Castle in 1800

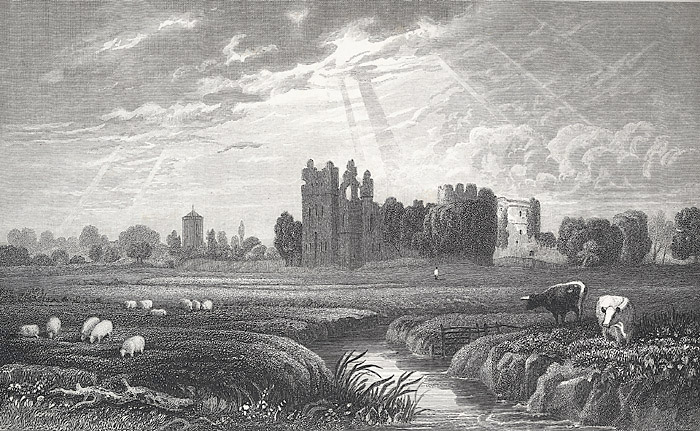
ca. 1830 engraving

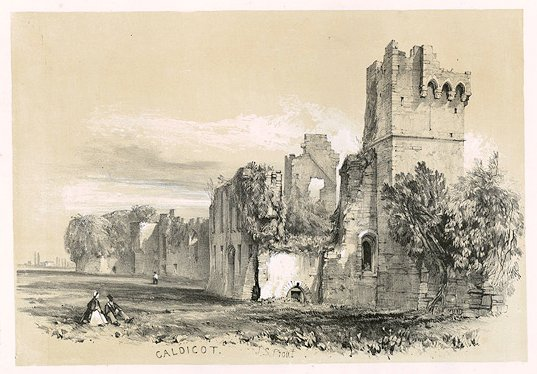
1838

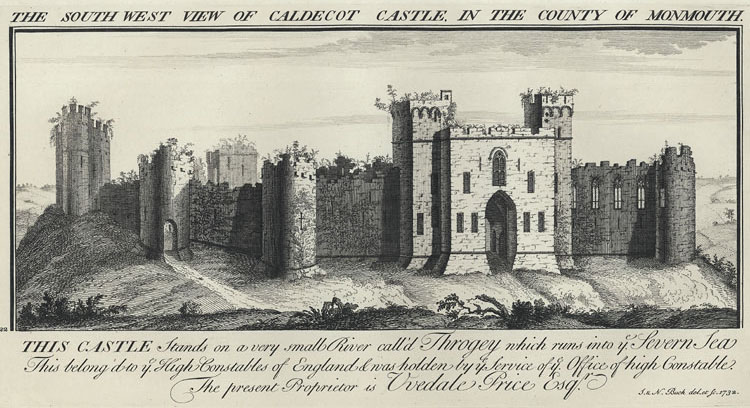
Engraving showing the south-west side of the castle in 1732

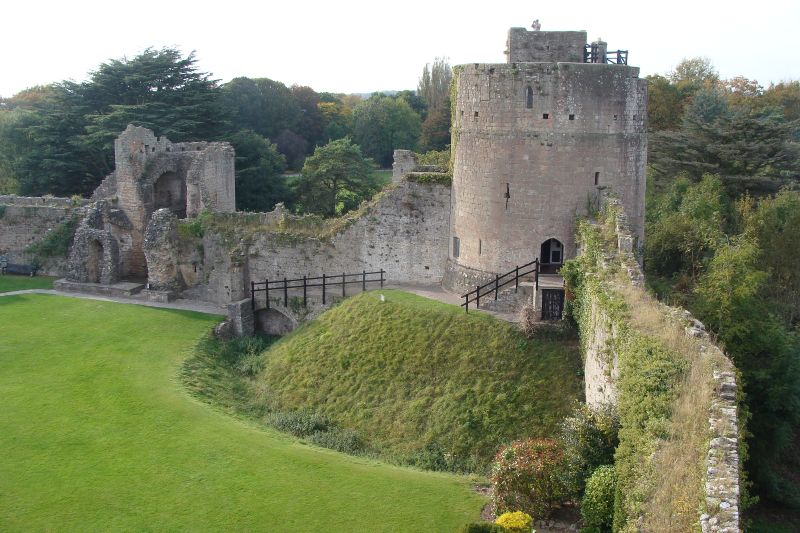
The keep

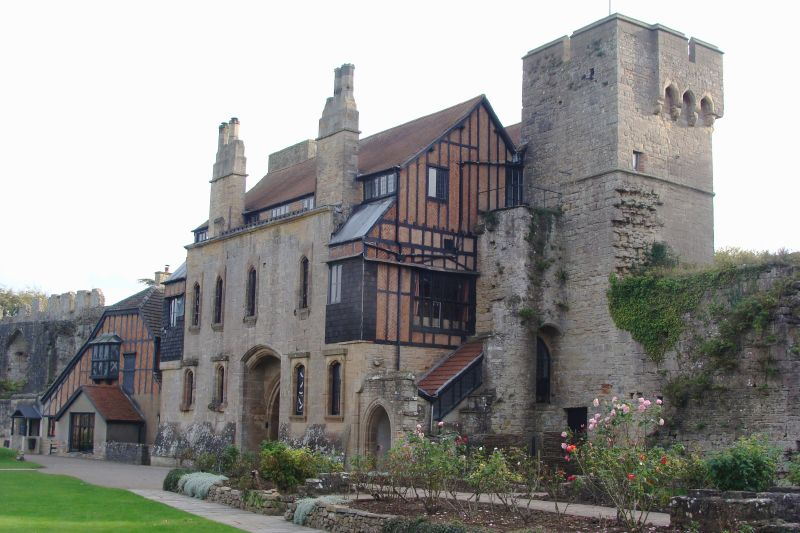
The gatehouse from within the castle, showing the 19th century rebuilding

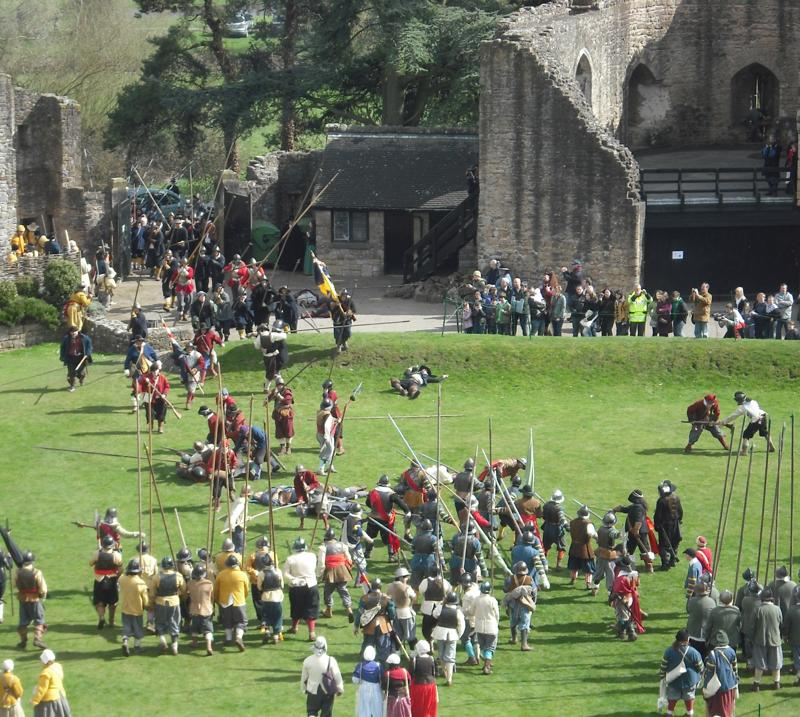
Re-enactment of a Civil War skirmish within the castle
