= Portskewett Pier railway station =

Former railway station in Wales

Coordinates: 51.58955°N 2.70412°W

Portskewett Pier
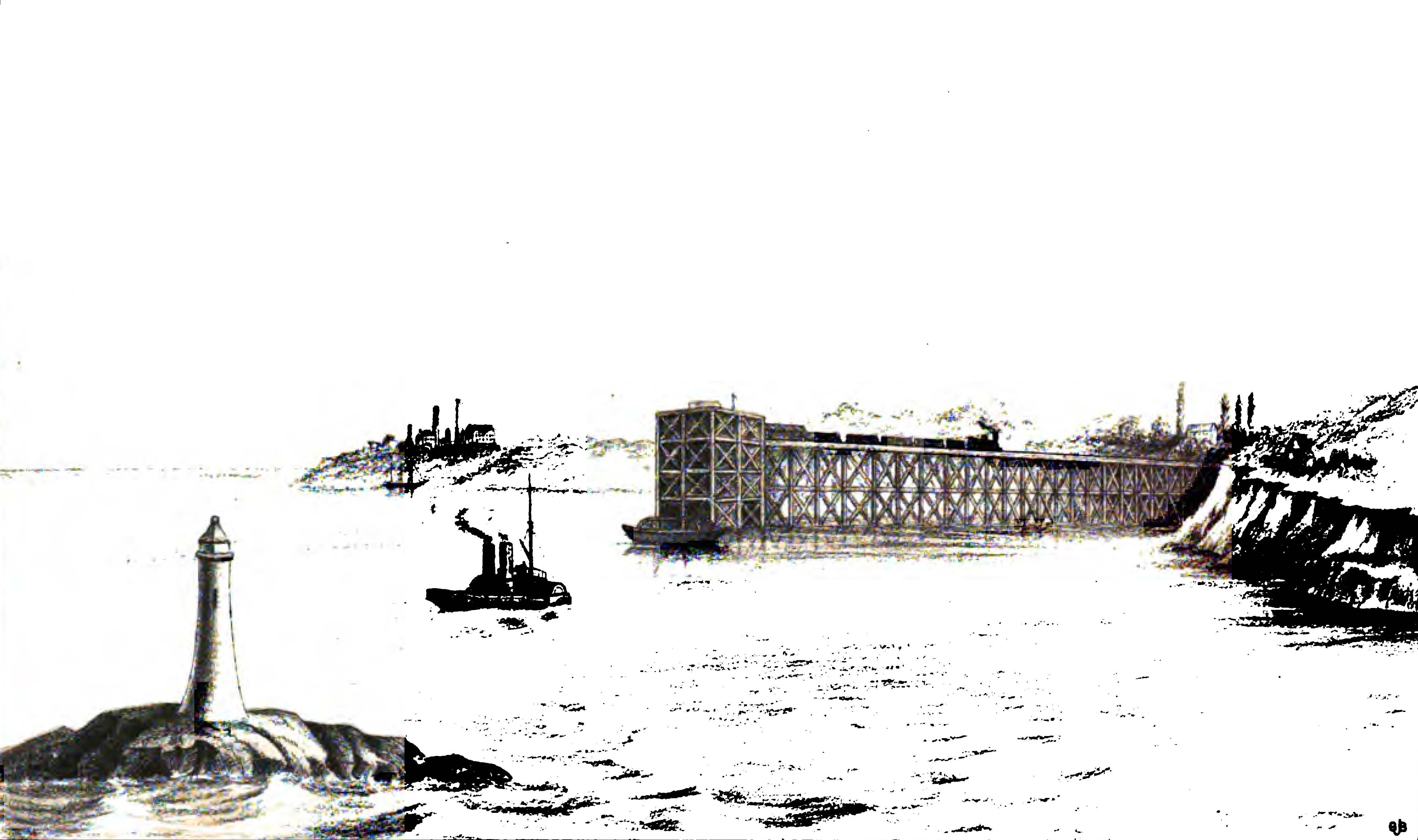
- Portskewett Pier. The works at Sudbrook for the Severn Tunnel may be seen in the background.

General information
- Location: Black Rock, Monmouthshire; Wales
- Platforms: 2

Other information
- Status: Disused

History
- Original company: Bristol & South Wales Union Railway
- Pre-grouping: Great Western Railway

Key dates
- 1863: Opened
- 1881: Fire
- 1886: Closed
Location

Portskewett Pier was a station on the Bristol & South Wales Union Railway. The pier at Black Rock, near Portskewett, was the Welsh side of the New Passage Ferry across the River Severn. The ferry linked rail services between Bristol and South Wales, avoiding the previous long detour through Gloucester. The ferry service lasted for nearly twenty five years, from 1863 to 1886, until the opening of the railway tunnel beneath the river.

== New Passage Ferry ==
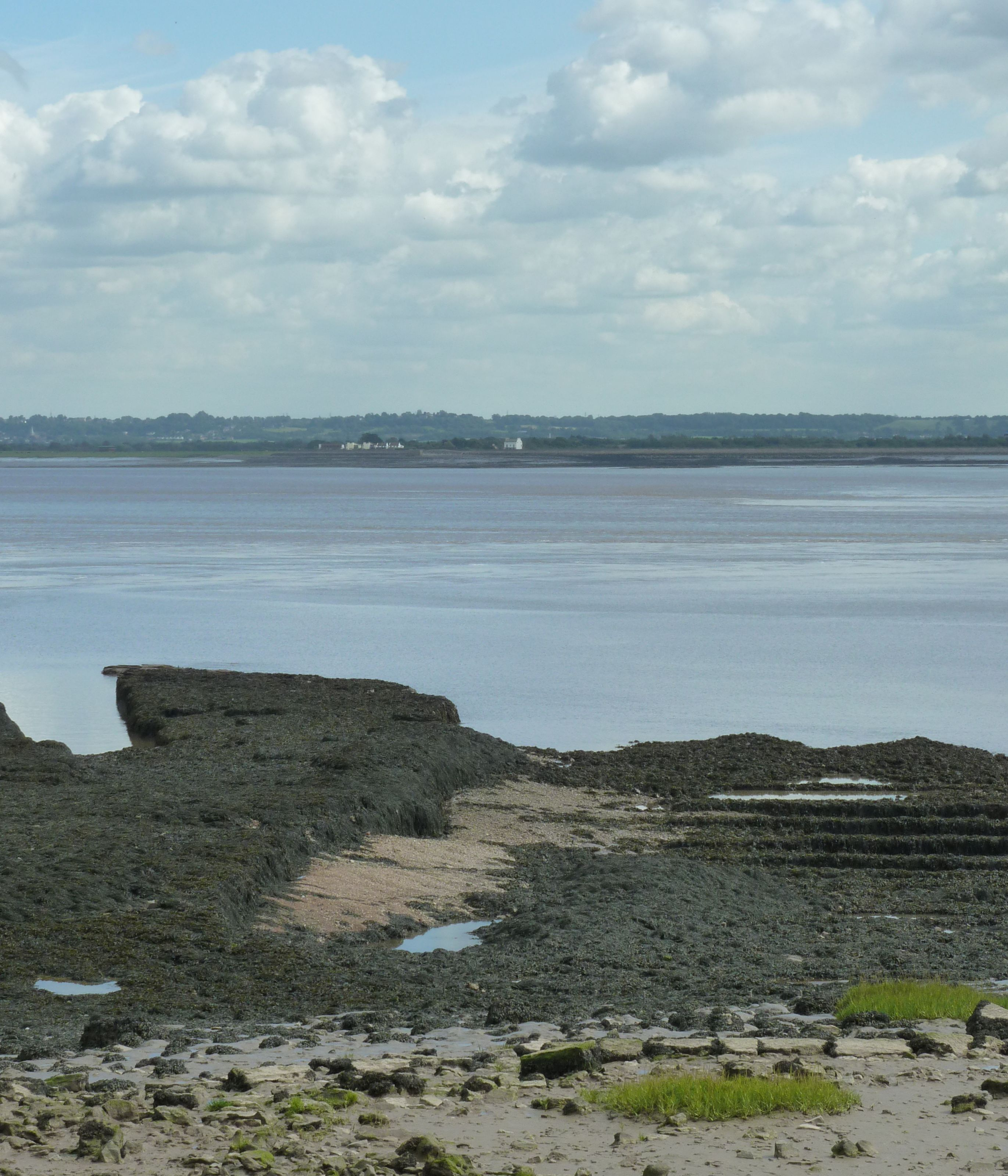
Looking across the route of the ferry from Black Rock, Wales, to New Passage in England

Brunel's Great Western Railway from London reached Bristol in 1841. The South Wales Main Line was built in 1850. There was no railway link between them though until 1852 when the Chepstow Railway Bridge was built, connecting South Wales to England, across the River Wye. Even after this, trains from Bristol to Cardiff still had to travel the long detour around through Gloucester, rather than crossing the Severn Estuary.

The Severn is noted for its extreme tidal range. This means that there are few safe crossing points for a ferry, the New Passage Ferry being the deeper channel downstream of the Dun Sand and upstream of the English Stones. This passes between New Passage Pier in Gloucestershire and Black Rock in Monmouthshire, approximately the line of the Second Severn Crossing. The other crossing in the area is upstream at the Old Passage Ferry, from Aust to Beachley, approximately the line of the earlier Severn Bridge. This crossing goes from England to England, as it is still slightly upstream of the confluence with the Wye below Chepstow, (Note: The Wye forms the boundary between England and Wales) and so a crossing to here would still require traffic to cross the Wye on its way to Cardiff.

The pier and station would be built at Black Rock, the landing point of the New Passage Ferry, rather than Portskewett village. There were only two buildings already here, the ferryman's house and the Black Rock Inn. From 1758 a turnpike road had been built from Black Rock to Crick and then the market town of Abergavenny. This road had avoided the nearby but then unimportant village of Caldicot.

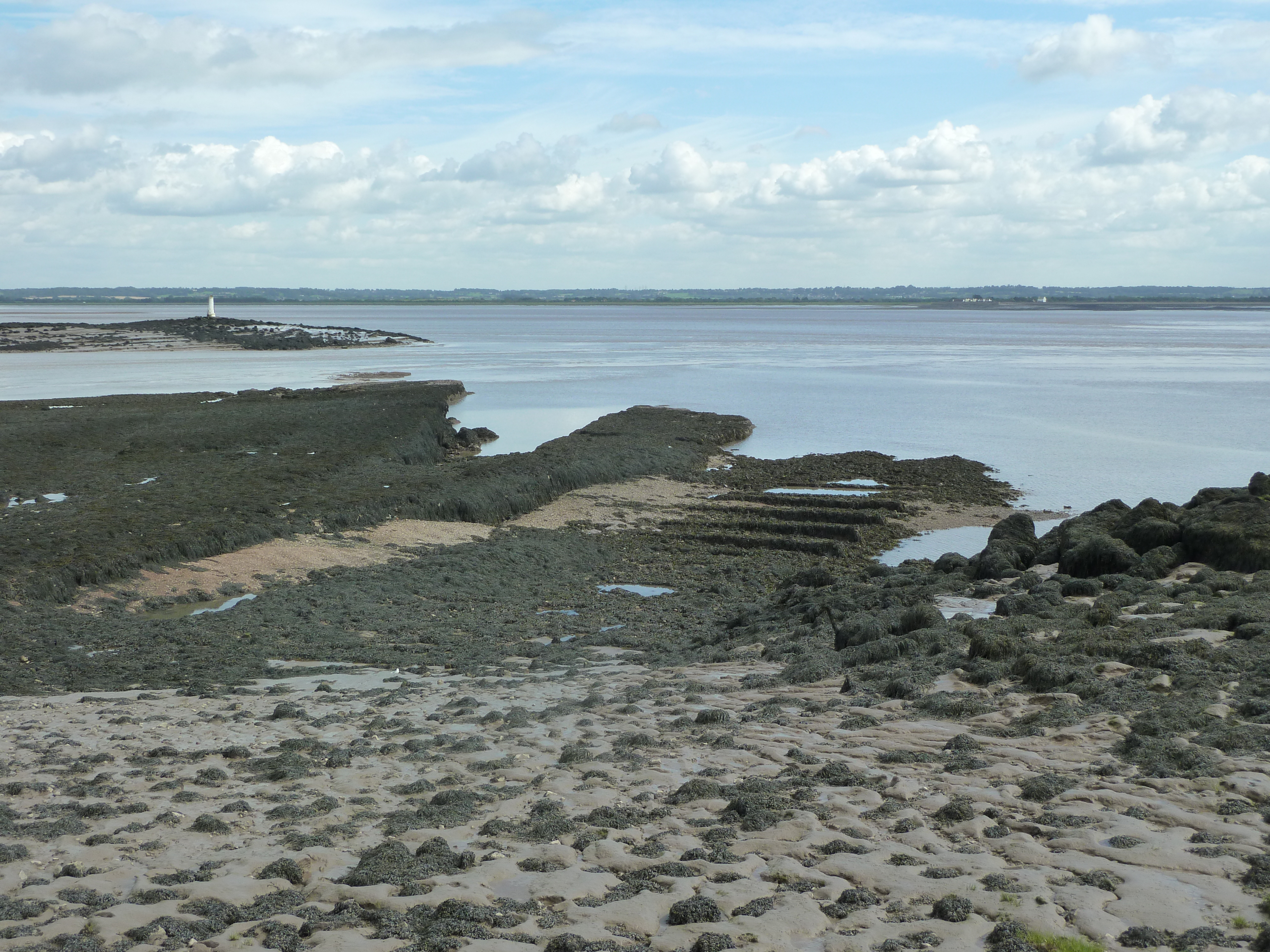
Surviving foundations of the pier

== Construction ==
The South Wales Main Line was opened from Chepstow (West station) to Cardiff in 1850, with intermediate stations East of Newport at Portskewett, Magor and Llanwern. Once the Wye bridge was opened, two years later, this provided a rail link from England to South Wales, via Gloucester and the South Wales Railway.

An Act of Parliament had already been granted in 1846 for the Junction Railway, but confidence in railway development collapsed around this time and it was not until 1856 that a new company was mooted, incorporated in 1857.

=== Line ===
The new pier was to be built within a mile south-east of Portskewett and the existing station. The first station, with no significant facilities, had been built just to the West of the bridge carrying the road to Southbrook. (Note: Southbrook Farm, later the village of Sudbrook) It was considered simpler to relocate the station as the new Portskewett Junction railway station and move it to the other side of the bridge, about ½mile East, rather than having to construct a second bridge to carry the road over the new pier line.

The New Passage line was opened on 8 September 1863, but the Portskewett side ran late. A locomotive was hired in September to work the branch but it was not ready for inspection by the Board of Trade until late November. This gave permission to open the line as a separate line, but not to work as a branch junction until the signalling had been improved, with the two ground frames for both lines moved to a single enclosed signal box serving both. The branch was finally opened fully on 1 January 1864.

The line was regauged to standard gauge in 1872.

== Fire ==
On Sunday night, 22 May 1881 the pier was substantially destroyed by a fire. This was during the long period when progress on the tunnel was largely suspended following the 'Great Spring' flood of 1879. Relations with the tunnel workers were strained and a strike had begun the previous day. The fire was thus often blamed on disgruntled tunnel workers, although this was denied by those closely involved with the works.

== Replacement by the tunnel ==
Even during the construction of the union railway, in 1862 Richardson had put forward the idea of a tunnel as an alternative. This tunnel faced a number of difficulties though and its construction was delayed for some years by water entering from the 'Great Spring' on the Monmouthshire side.

Local passenger trains through the Severn Tunnel began from December 1886, with through services to London from July 1889. Freight services, primarily coal, had begun some months earlier but this traffic had never crossed by the ferry anyway. The effect on passenger traffic was immediate, travel by the tunnel now taking 75 minutes from Cardiff to Bristol, around half of a typical crossing by two trains and the ferry.

The Portskewett branch closed the day before the Tunnel opened and its demolition began shortly afterwards. The engine shed and refreshment room at Portskewett Junction were both removed. The Junction had previously also acted as the junction station for the Wye Valley Railway, (Note: Even though the Valley trains also passed through Chepstow) but these would now terminate at the new Severn Tunnel Junction. Some of the track at was kept though, and formed a new Down line refuge siding. This remained in service into the 1950s and the shrinkage of slow goods services, and the eventual closure of the Portskewett Junction station under Beeching.

== Surviving traces today ==
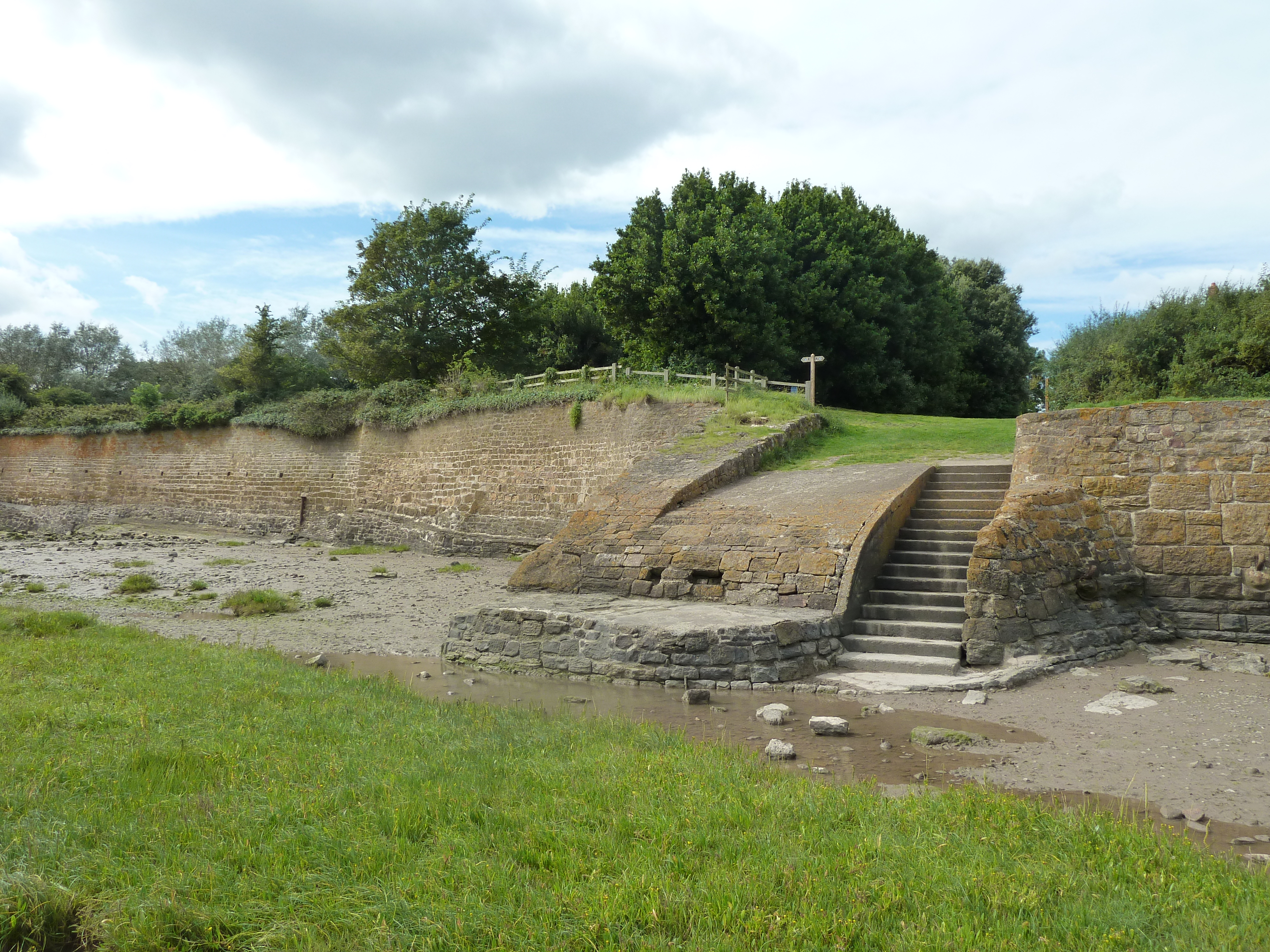
The sea wall constructed as part of the pier works

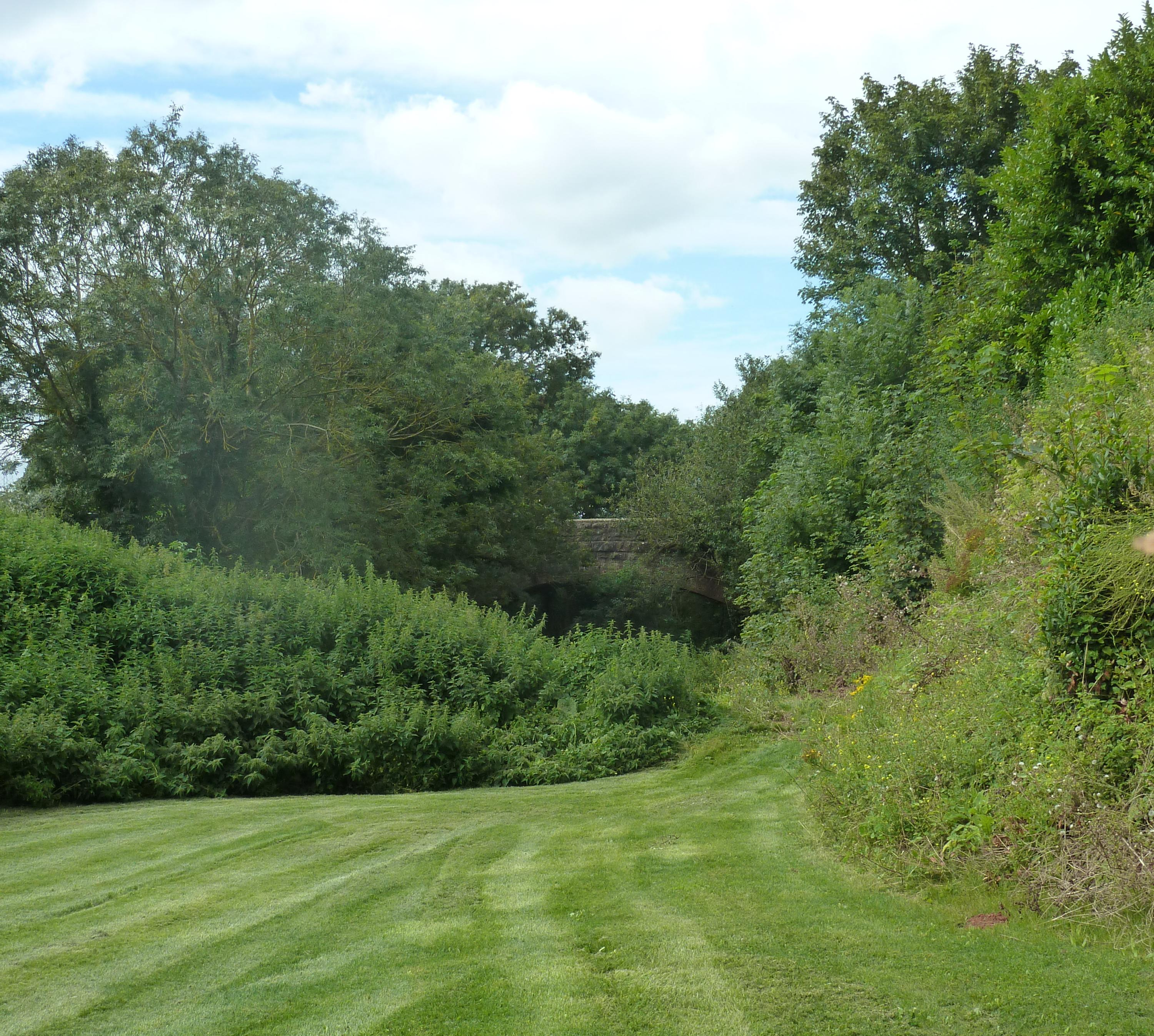
The station location, looking back to the first road overbridge

The area has hardly been developed since and so the alignment of the railway line is still easily visible. Two stone road overbridges still carry the now barely used road over the shallow cutting. Of the pier, stone foundations can still be seen at low tide.
