= Charles Richardson (civil engineer) =

English civil engineer

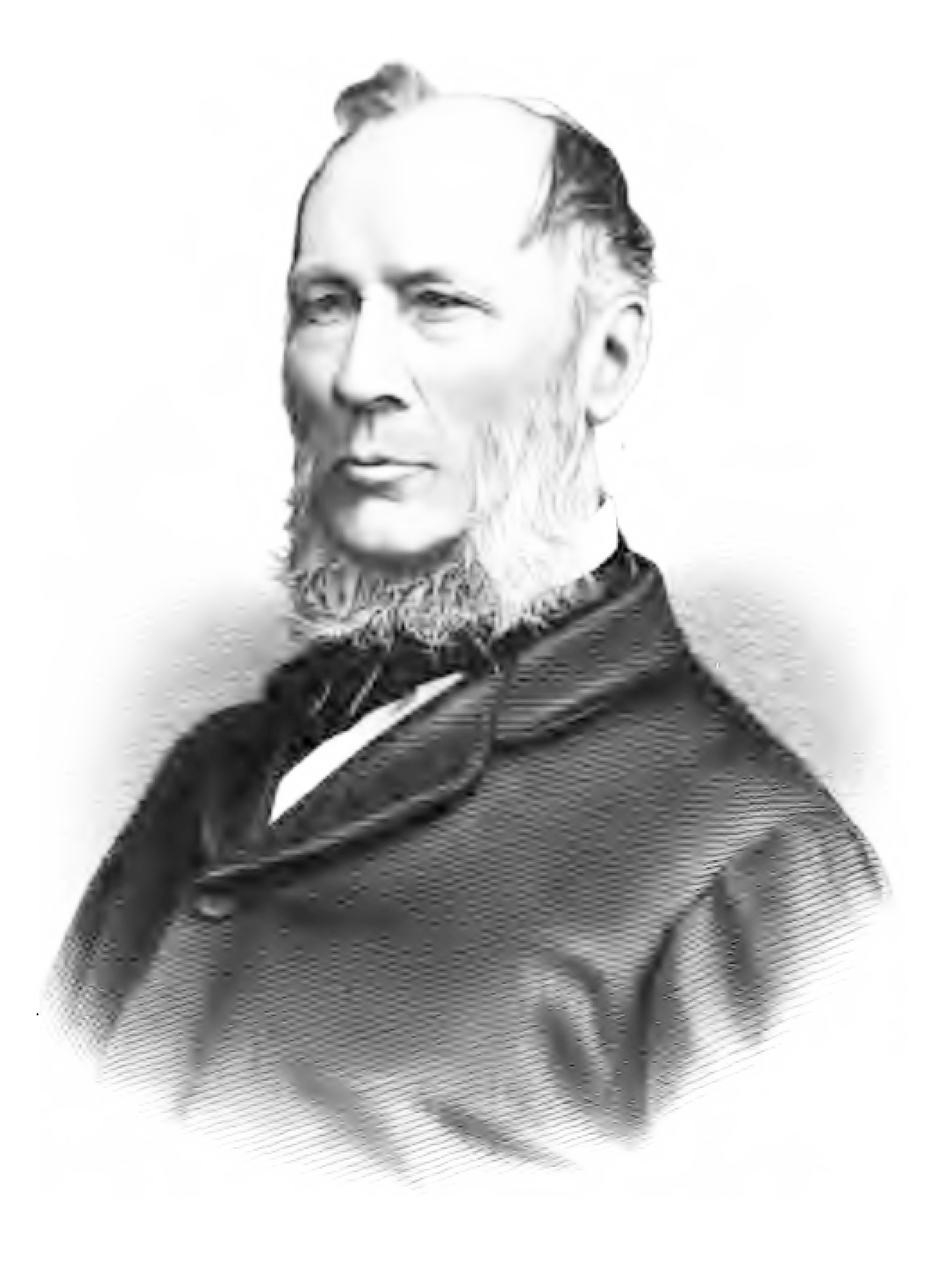
- Charles Richardson
- Born: 29 August 1814; Capenhurst Hall, Cheshire
- Died: 1896 (aged 81–82)
- Parent(s): Charles Richardson, Deputy Lieutenant of Cheshire
- Engineering career
- Discipline: civil engineer
- Projects: Severn Tunnel

Sir Charles Richardson (1814–1896) was the resident engineer of the Bristol and South Wales Union Railway. He was also the instigator and first engineer of the Severn Tunnel.

== Early life ==
Richardson was born at Capenhurst Hall in Cheshire. He was educated in England and France. His father, Richard, died when he was six. Despite an early sporting talent for cricket, it was now clear that he would need to make his own living and so, encouraged by his mother, he followed his other talent for engineering.

He attended Edinburgh University from 1833, reading Mathematics.

== Early career ==
He was taken as a pupil by Marc Brunel, working with him on the Thames Tunnel. From then he worked with the Brunels on a number of railway projects, particularly involving tunnelling. These included Box Tunnel and Sapperton Tunnel.

Richardson was noted for his interest in cricket. This led to some conflict with Brunel over disruptions to his work, although equally it was encouraged by other contractors (Note: Most famously, Thomas A. Walker, who promoted the development of cricket at Sudbrook amongst the workers on the Severn Tunnel.) as an alternative to the evils of drink.

In 1858 Brunel appointed Richardson as the resident engineer of the Bristol and South Wales Union Railway. This work involved railway lines and tunnels, but also two large piers at New Passage and Portskewett. These piers included floating pontoons to cope with the enormous tidal range of the Severn estuary.

== Severn Tunnel ==
During the completion of the ferry piers, around 1863, Richardson began to advocate an underwater tunnel as a better means of joining the Bristol and South Wales lines. Plans for bridges were also afoot at this time, a long viaduct from Oldbury, never built, and also the Severn Railway Bridge further upstream.

In November 1871, the first plans for the tunnel were deposited with Parliament. The Act was obtained in 1872 and work began in 1873. The consulting engineer for this project was John Hawkshaw with Alfred Gooch (Note: Third son of Daniel Gooch) as Richardson's assistant. The first contractor for the tunnel works was Rowland Brotherhood, with whom Richardson had previously worked on the Wharncliffe Viaduct at Hanwell.

Daniel Gooch later appears dissatisfied with Richardson's work and in May 1878 described him in his diary thus, "Richardson, the engineer, has no go in him and does not move without consulting me, making me almost the engineer."

Work on the tunnel progressed well and by 17 October 1879 the two headings from each side of the river were within 138 yards of joining up. This was the date of the opening of the nearby Severn Railway Bridge, which Gooch attended as chairman of the GWR and had invited the guests present to view the even more impressive tunnel with the ironic warning, "It will be rather wet and you had better bring your umbrellas". On the 18th, a massive inflow of water had broken into the tunnel, from an unexpected direction in one of the landward tunnels on the Welsh side, entirely flooding the workings. Tunnelling would be repeatedly disrupted by this water for several years, even after the tunnel was first drained and tunnelling work began again in 1881. Hawkshaw rapidly replaced Richardson as chief engineer. Within two months, Thomas Walker, who had originally tendered for the construction of the tunnel, was appointed as the new contractor. The tunnel did not finally open until 1886, after much effort and innovation in both pumping and in working underwater.

During his time at Sudbrook, Richardson continued with his interest in cricket. This led to his invention of the modern cricket bat, with its cane-spliced handle.

== Bibliography ==
- Buchanan, R. Angus (2002). Brunel, the Life and Times of Isambard Kingdom Brunel. Hambledon. p. 159. ISBN 1852855258.
- "Severn Tunnel (1)". Track Topics, A GWR Book of Railway Engineering. Great Western Railway. 1971 [1935]. p. 179.
- Jones, Stephen K. (2009). Brunel in South Wales. Vol. III: Links with Leviathans. Stroud: The History Press. ISBN 9780752449128.
- Leleux, Sydney A. (1965). Brotherhoods, Engineers. David & Charles. p. 10.
- Rolt, LTC (1970). Victorian Engineering. Penguin. p. 256. ISBN 0-14-008124-0.
- Walker, Thomas A. (1888). The Severn Tunnel: Its Construction and Difficulties (1872–1887) . p. 18.
