= Crick, Monmouthshire =

Coordinates: 51.61005°N 2.74800°W

Crick: Welsh: Crug
- Location within Monmouthshire
- OS grid reference: ST483904
- Principal area: Monmouthshire
- Preserved county: Gwent
- Country: Wales
- Sovereign state: United Kingdom
- Post town: CALDICOT
- Postcode district: NP26
- Dialling code: 01291
- Police: Gwent
- Fire: South Wales
- Ambulance: Welsh
- UK Parliament: Monmouth

Crick (Welsh: Crug) is a small village or hamlet in the Welsh county of Monmouthshire, United Kingdom. It is located on the A48 road 1 mile north of the town of Caldicot and 1 mile east of Caerwent.

== History and amenities ==
The name has the same root as craig or graig in Wales and Carrick (An Charraig) in Ireland, meaning "rock", but possibly refers to the Bronze Age round barrow just west of the village, measuring 31.7m in diameter and the only known bell barrow in Wales. It was excavated in 1940, and found to contain two cremations dating from around 1750-1450 BC. It also contained boulders showing cup marks, which it has been suggested show astronomically significant alignments. There was also evidence of Roman building.

The site of Crick was an important junction on the Roman road sometimes known as the Via Julia which ran from Bath (Aquae Sulis) across the Severn estuary to Sudbrook and on to Caerwent (Venta Silurum) and Caerleon (Isca Augusta), now in Wales. At Crick the route met the roads to Gloucester (Glevum) and Monmouth (Blestium).

There is also evidence of an early Norman motte and bailey castle at Ballan Moor, 550 metres south of the village, probably built by the Ballon family in the late 11th or early 12th century.

There was a chapel - variously referred to as St. Nuvien, Nyfain or Nyvein after the early Monmouthshire saint mentioned in the Book of Llan Dav - which was converted into a barn in the old manor house of Crick. The barn is now St. Nyvern's Chapel House, part of the 16th-century Old Manor Farm. On the Monmouthshire County Council depot site are the remains of a moated platform, believed to be of the 13th-century manor house of William Derneford, lord of Crick. The 18th-century Crick House, south of the A48, now a care home, was the home of John Lawrence, J.P., lord of Langstone and Sheriff of Monmouthshire in 1869.

In July 1645, during the English Civil War, a mediaeval hall at Crick was the site of a key meeting between King Charles, who had been recently defeated at Langport in Somerset, and his nephew and ally Prince Rupert of the Rhine.

David Broome, the former international equestrian show jumper is from the area and runs the David Broome Event Centre at Mount Ballan.

== See also ==
- Nedern Brook Wetlands
