= St Mary's Church, Portskewett =

St Mary's, Portskewett
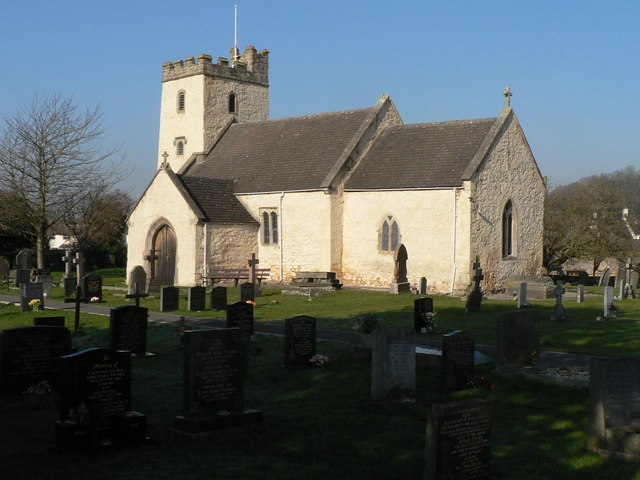
- St Mary's, Portskewett
- St Mary's, Portskewett
- 51.5896°N 2.7248°W
- Location: Monmouth, Monmouthshire
- Country: Wales
- Denomination: Church in Wales

Architecture
- Years built: 14th century

Administration
- Diocese: Monmouth

Clergy
- Rector: Dennis Richards

St Mary's is a church in the centre of the village of Portskewett, Monmouthshire, Wales. It has been designated a Grade I listed building since 19 August 1955.

== History and architecture ==
The church has a Norman nave and further substantial Norman elements, a medieval chancel and was extended and renovated in the early and late 19th century. The style is Gothic Decorated. The list of rectors dates to 1427, and its registers date to 1593.
