= Nedern Brook Wetlands =

Protected area in Monmouthshire, Wales

- Site of Special Scientific Interest
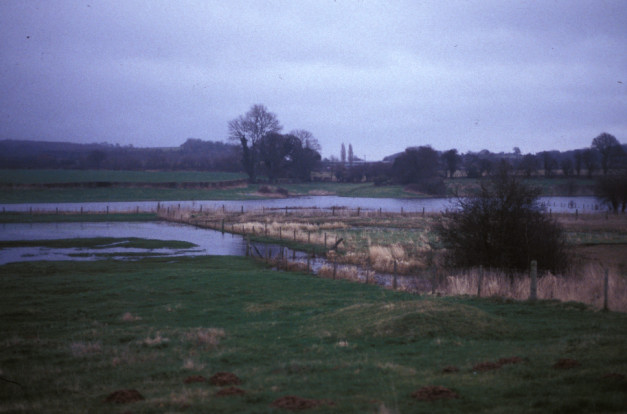
- The northern part of the wetlands, near Caerwent, and historically the site of a "whirly hole"

- Location within Monmouthshire
- Location of Nedern Brook Wetlands.
- Grid reference: ST486893
- Coordinates: 51.600°N 2.742°W
- Interest: Biological
- Area: 44.5 hectares (0.445 km^{2}; 0.172 sq mi)
- Notification date: 1988

The Nedern Brook Wetland is a flood meadow habitat near Caldicot, Monmouthshire, Wales, designated since 1988 as a Site of Special Scientific Interest (SSSI). The site is of 44.5 hectares (110 acres) and is bridged by the M48 motorway. The spelling Neddern is used in some documents. Nedern Brook is also called Troggy Brook.

== Ecology ==
The site comprises flat low-lying flood-meadow in the shallow valley of the Nedern Brook, which flows from the north-west near Caerwent to the Severn estuary between Caldicot and Portskewett. The special feature of the site is its seasonal flooding, which usually covers between one third to one half of the site between November and April each winter. The temporary lake that is formed by the flooding, similar in some respects to a turlough, can be up to 1.5 kilometres (0.93 mi) long, up to 30 hectares (74 acres) in extent, and up to 2 metres (6 ft 7 in) deep. This type of habitat is now very rare in Wales.

The wetland was identified in 1982 as a site of regional importance for a variety of bird species, including common redshank, northern lapwing, mute swan, common reed bunting, western yellow wagtail and common shelduck, all of which are breeding species, as well as accommodating winter visitors notably Bewick's swan and Eurasian wigeon. The site also contains other habitats, including running water, marginal and inundation vegetation, that contribute to its wildlife interest. In the summer, surface water is restricted to the brook itself.

== Geology and hydrology ==
Soils on the site comprise heavy clay with some peat, superimposed on glacial and estuarine gravel and mud deposits. In turn, these overlay Triassic dolomitic conglomerate in the west and Carboniferous Limestone in the east.

A hydrological study by the British Geological Survey, published in 2016, noted that the Nedern Brook had in the past been deepened and canalised, though the paleochannels of the old river meanders can still be seen. The study found that "as water levels rise in the Carboniferous limestone aquifer below the site, eventually reaching the surface, springs and seepages result in the formation of the temporary (ephemeral) freshwater lake. The process by which the temporary lake occurs is not due to 'fluvial' flooding caused by the over-topping of river banks, but rather is a result of rising groundwater levels. This process is entirely natural and is dominated by the seasonal changes in groundwater levels coupled with the topographically low setting of the Nedern: it is just 5 m or so above sea level. The lake dries up as groundwater levels in the underlying aquifer recede during the spring and summer." The study proposed that the name Tir-Llyn Nedern be adopted for the (otherwise unnamed) temporary lake.

== Castrogi Brook ==
The watercourse commences as the Castrogi or Cas-Troggy Brook from multiple springs in the vicinity of Cas Troggy on the northwest side of Wentwood. It flows first northeast and then southeast through a series of entrenched meanders to the east of Wentwood. The brook then enters the broad vale in which Caerwent sits and, passing under the A48 road at Cas-Troggy Bridge, it assumes the name Nedern Brook.

== History ==
In Roman times, it is likely that trading vessels sailed up the Nedern Brook to Caerwent. The waterway later silted up. This may have been the result of natural processes, possibly accompanied by active land reclamation in the mediaeval period, and certainly exacerbated by work relating to the excavation of the Severn rail tunnel in the 1870s. In 1879, work on the tunnel was temporarily stopped when it was inundated by fresh water from what was known as the "Great Spring". Improved pumping was introduced, the spring was sealed, and the water diverted away from the tunnel. The hydrological survey in 2016 stated that "the concrete lined channel installed by Victorian engineers, in an attempt to reduce water inflow into the Severn Tunnel, is reported to be in poor condition and ineffective in retaining water in the brook".

Local historian John Nettleship and others have postulated that swallow holes on the site known locally as "whirlyholes" created a siphon effect, and could have generated the early Welsh story of Llyn Lliwan, mentioned in the Historia Brittonum as producing volumes of fresh water when the tide falls in the nearby Severn estuary. The holes were blocked with clay as part of the Severn Tunnel work.
