= Portskewett railway station =

Former railway station in Wales

Coordinates: 51.590799°N 2.714958°W

Portskewett
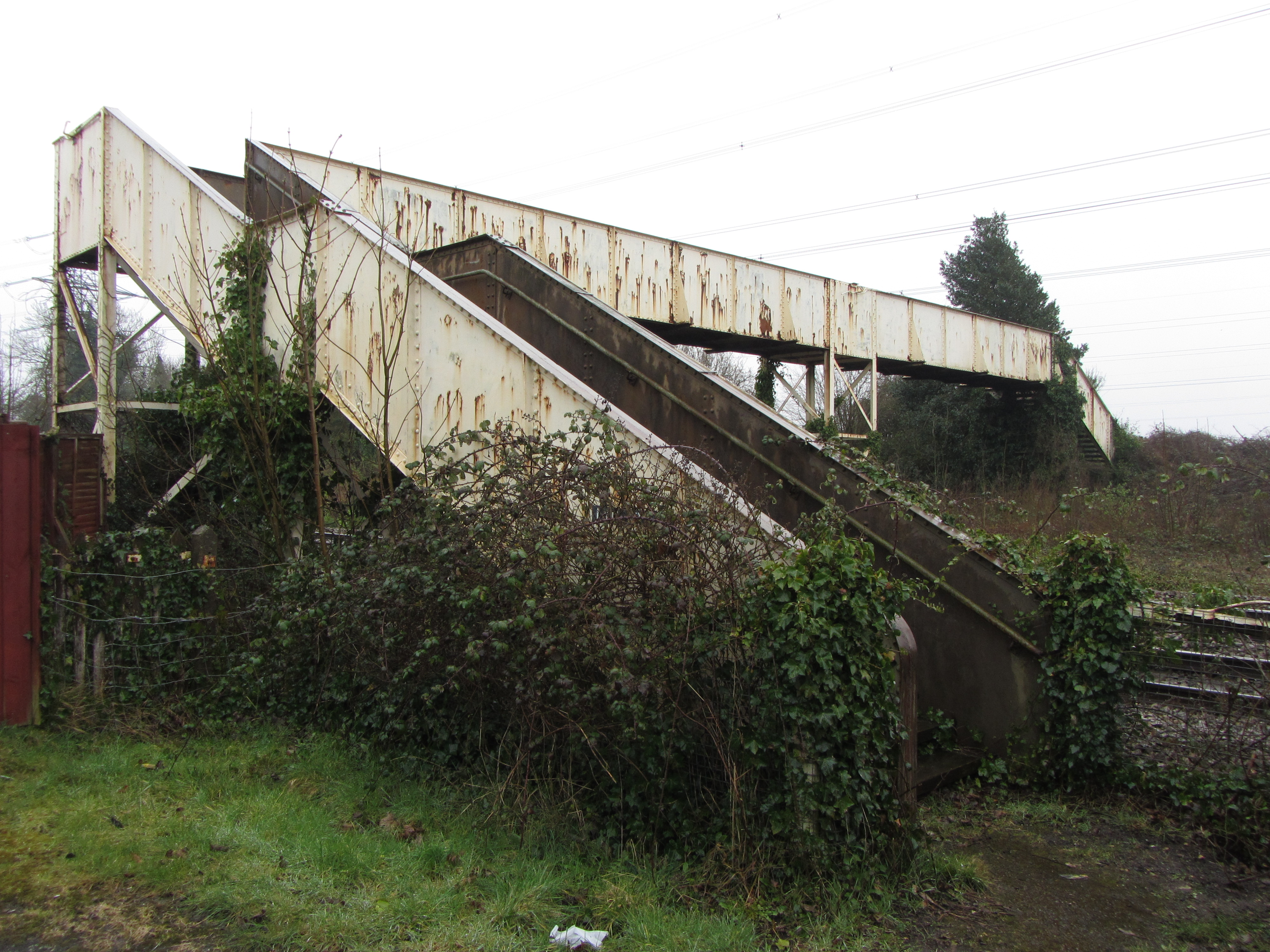
- The footbridge at the site of the station in 2013

General information
- Location: Portskewett, Monmouthshire; Wales
- Platforms: 2

Other information
- Status: Disused

History
- Original company: South Wales Railway
- Pre-grouping: Great Western Railway

Key dates
- 16 June 1850: Opened (Chepstow to Swansea)
- 1 October 1863: Station moved 800 yards east
- 2 November 1964: Closed
Location

Portskewett railway station is a former station serving Portskewett, Wales, four miles south west of Chepstow and one mile east of Caldicot. It was opened as a broad gauge line with the South Wales Railway in 1850 and closed to passengers in 1964.

Between 8 September 1863 and 1886 the station was known as Portskewett Junction, where the Bristol and South Wales Union Railway diverged for the New Passage Ferry crossing to Bristol. This new station was at a location 800 yards east of the original location. The opening of the Severn Tunnel in 1886 made the ferry at Black Rock redundant.

The station was twin platform with a footbridge. The footbridge and the twin track line remain in use today.

Portskewett Pier railway station was opened on 1 January 1864 and closed 1 December 1886.
