= Wharncliffe Viaduct =

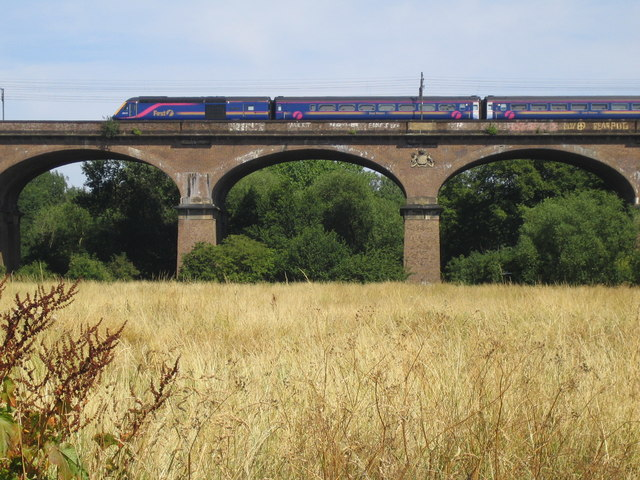
- Looking north, July 2006
- Coordinates: 51°30′39″N 0°20′39″W
- Carries: Great Western Main Line
- Crosses: River Brent
- Locale: Southall, London Hanwell, London
- Maintained by: Network Rail
- Heritage status: Grade I listed building

Characteristics
- Design: arch bridge
- Total length: 270 metres (890 ft)
- Width: 17 metres (56 ft)
- Longest span: 21 metres (69 ft)

History
- Construction start: 1836
- Construction end: 1837

Location
- Interactive map of Wharncliffe Viaduct

The Wharncliffe Viaduct is a brick-built viaduct that carries the Great Western Main Line railway across the Brent Valley, between Hanwell and Southall, Ealing, UK, at an elevation of 20 metres (66 ft). The viaduct, built in 1836–7, was constructed for the opening of the Great Western Railway (GWR). It is situated between Southall and Hanwell stations, the latter station being only a very short distance away to the east.

The viaduct was the first major structural design by Isambard Kingdom Brunel, the first building contract to be let on the GWR project, and the first major engineering work to be completed. It was also the first railway viaduct to be built with hollow piers, a feature much appreciated by a colony of bats which has since taken up residence within.

== Background ==
The Great Western Railway was established in 1835 to build a line from London in the east to Bristol in the west. Its chief engineer was Isambard Kingdom Brunel, who personally supervised all major civil engineering works on the route. The River Brent was the first significant obstacle on the route and the Wharncliffe Viaduct was the first major engineering work.

== Design ==
Constructed of engineering brick, the 270-metre-long (890 ft) viaduct has eight semi-elliptical arches, each spanning 70 feet (21 m) and rising 5.3 metres (17 ft). It is 17 metres (56 ft) wide. The supporting piers are hollow and tapered, rising to projecting stone cornices that held up the arch centring during construction.

When built, the viaduct was designed to carry two broad gauge tracks: the piers were 9.1 metres (30 ft) wide at ground level and 10 metres (33 ft) at deck level.

The contractor was the partnership of Thomas Grissell and Samuel Morton Peto. The cost was £40,000. The foundation works were carried out by William Brotherhood and his son Rowland. The young Charles Richardson also worked here under Brunel, as one of his first works for the Great Western.

As travel by rail became more popular and rail traffic grew, pressure mounted to have an additional local line. Also, the Railway Regulation (Gauge) Act 1846 (9 & 10 Vict. c. 57) decreed that George Stephenson's (narrower) standard gauge should be the standard used for all railways across the country. Therefore, in 1877 the viaduct was widened by the addition of an extra row of piers and arches on the north side. Then in 1892 the broad gauge track was converted to standard gauge, and this allowed enough width for four standard gauge tracks.

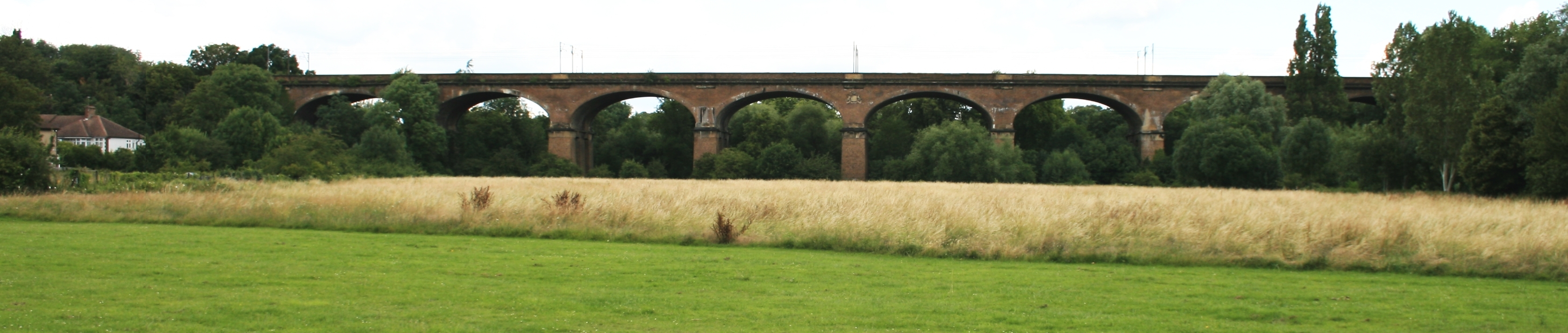
The whole viaduct, viewed from the south

Notice how the visual impact of the overhead electrification has been minimised by placing the supporting towers
for the catenary on the alternate centre lines of the viaduct's columns, thus maintaining symmetry of form.

On the central pier on the south side is a carving of the coat of arms of James Stuart Wortley Mackenzie, Lord Wharncliffe, who was chairman of the parliamentary committee that steered the passage of the GWR Bill through Parliament.

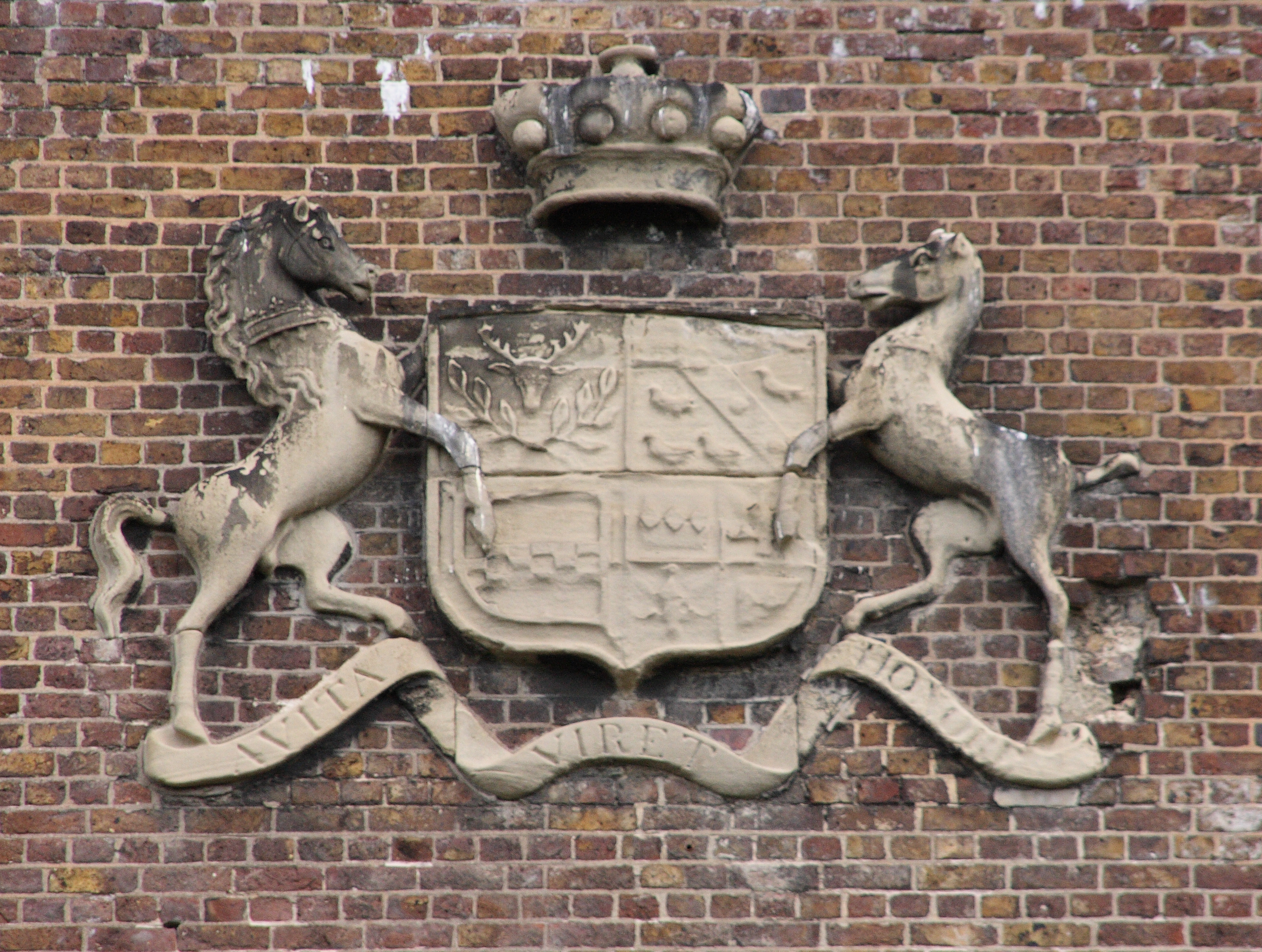
Wharncliffe coat of arms

== First viaduct to carry telegraph ==
Brunel was quick to see the possible advantages of the early electric telegraph system for use in running the railway. In 1838 he persuaded Sir Charles Wheatstone and William Fothergill Cooke to install their five-needle telegraph system between Paddington Station and West Drayton and to carry out experiments. It proved to be useful, so the viaduct thus carried the world's first commercial electrical telegraph, on 9 April 1839.

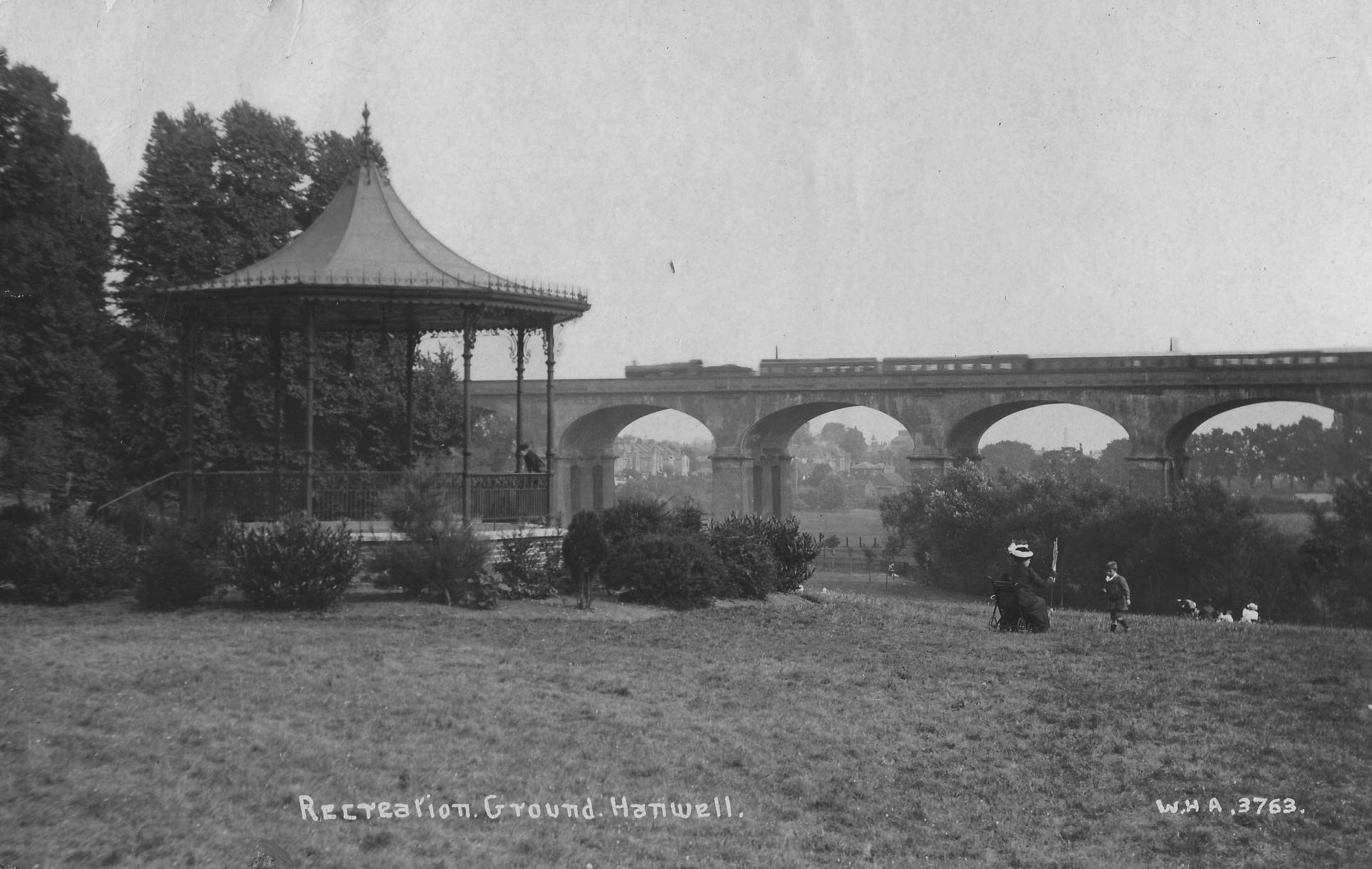
Wharncliffe Viaduct, Hanwell – c.1900 (looking south)

At first, the seven-core cables were carried inside cast iron pipes, on short wooden spikes, a few feet from the side of the railway line. But from January 1843, the public were treated to the sight of telegraph wires against the sky line, across the top of the viaduct, for the first time. Cooke had renegotiated the contract with the GWR and extended the telegraph to Slough, using a simpler two-needle instrument that could be supplied with just two wires suspended from porcelain insulators on poles.

On 16 May 1843 the Paddington-to-Slough telegraph went public, becoming Britain's first public telegraph service. Despite being something of a publicity stunt for Cooke, it became very popular, and HM Government were frequently using it for communication with the royal household at Windsor Castle nearby.

In early 1845, John Tawell was apprehended following the use of a needle telegraph message from Slough to Paddington on 1 January 1845. This is thought to be the first use of the telegraph to catch a murderer.

The message was:

A murder has just been committed at Salt Hill and the suspected murderer was seen to take a first class ticket to London by the train that left Slough at 7.42pm. He is in the garb of a Kwaker with a brown great coat on which reaches his feet. He is in the last compartment of the second first-class carriage

As the telecommunication traffic grew, the viaduct came to carry one of the trunk routes for the transatlantic cables, and more recently fibre-optic cables.

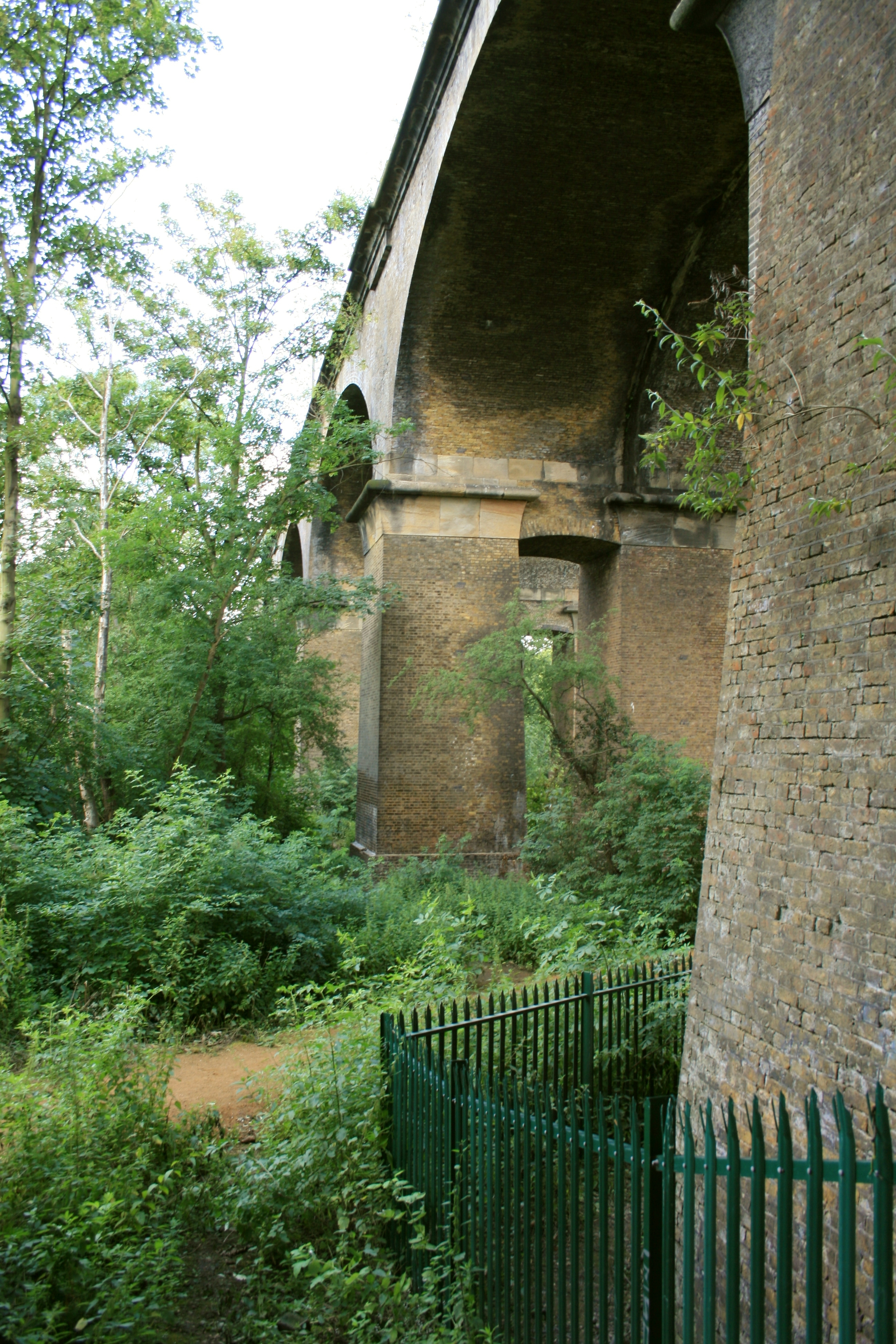
Note the Egyptian styled columns

== Public recognition ==
The viaduct was among the first structures to be listed, being defined as a Grade I listed building on 8 November 1949 (the legal framework for listing was introduced in 1947).

Sir Nikolaus Pevsner, CBE, the historian of art and architecture, said of it, "Few viaducts have such architectural panache."

It is one of the key locations in the bid for historic parts of the original GWR main line from Paddington to be recognised as a World Heritage Site.

On the nearby Uxbridge Road, an eighteenth-century coaching inn was renamed The Viaduct in its honour when the railway opened. This pub, which is itself listed as of local interest, still contains parts of the original stable block.

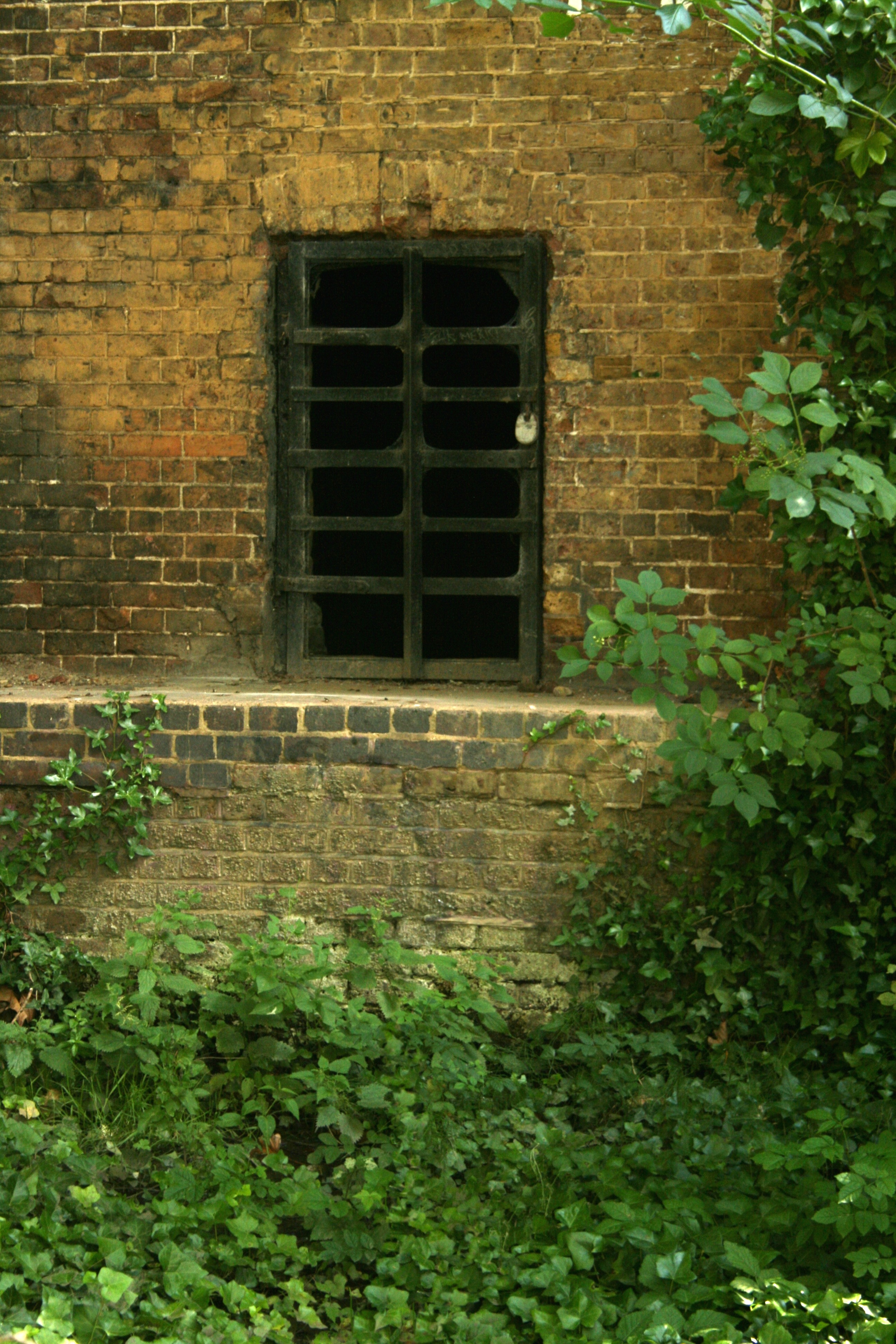
Bat Cave

The hollow cavities within the structure of the supporting piers provide convenient roosting places for bats.

== Location ==
The Wharncliffe Viaduct is best viewed from Brent Meadow on the south side, accessed from the Uxbridge Road, opposite Ealing Hospital. This is an area being maintained as a traditional hay meadow and is part of the Brent River Park.

The river Brent has marked the boundary between Hanwell and Southall since before the Domesday Book.

== See also ==
- River Brent
- List of bridges in London
- List of railway bridges and viaducts in the United Kingdom
