= Thomas A. Walker =

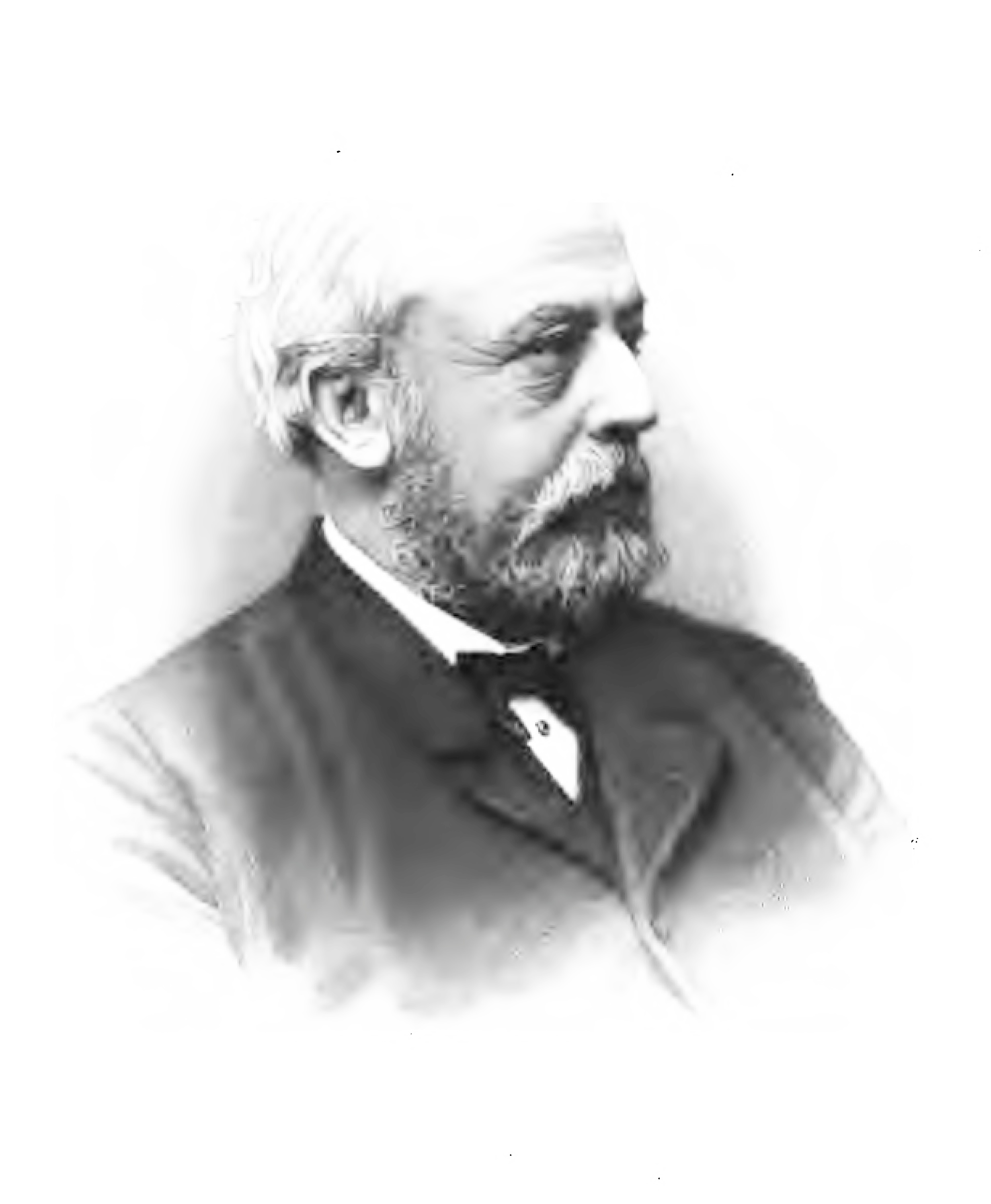
Thomas A. Walker in an engraving by George J. Stodart

Thomas Andrew Walker (15 October 1828 – 25 November 1889) was an English civil engineering contractor.

He worked on major infrastructure projects in the latter half of the 19th century, including the Severn Tunnel, the Manchester Ship canal, and the London District Railway.

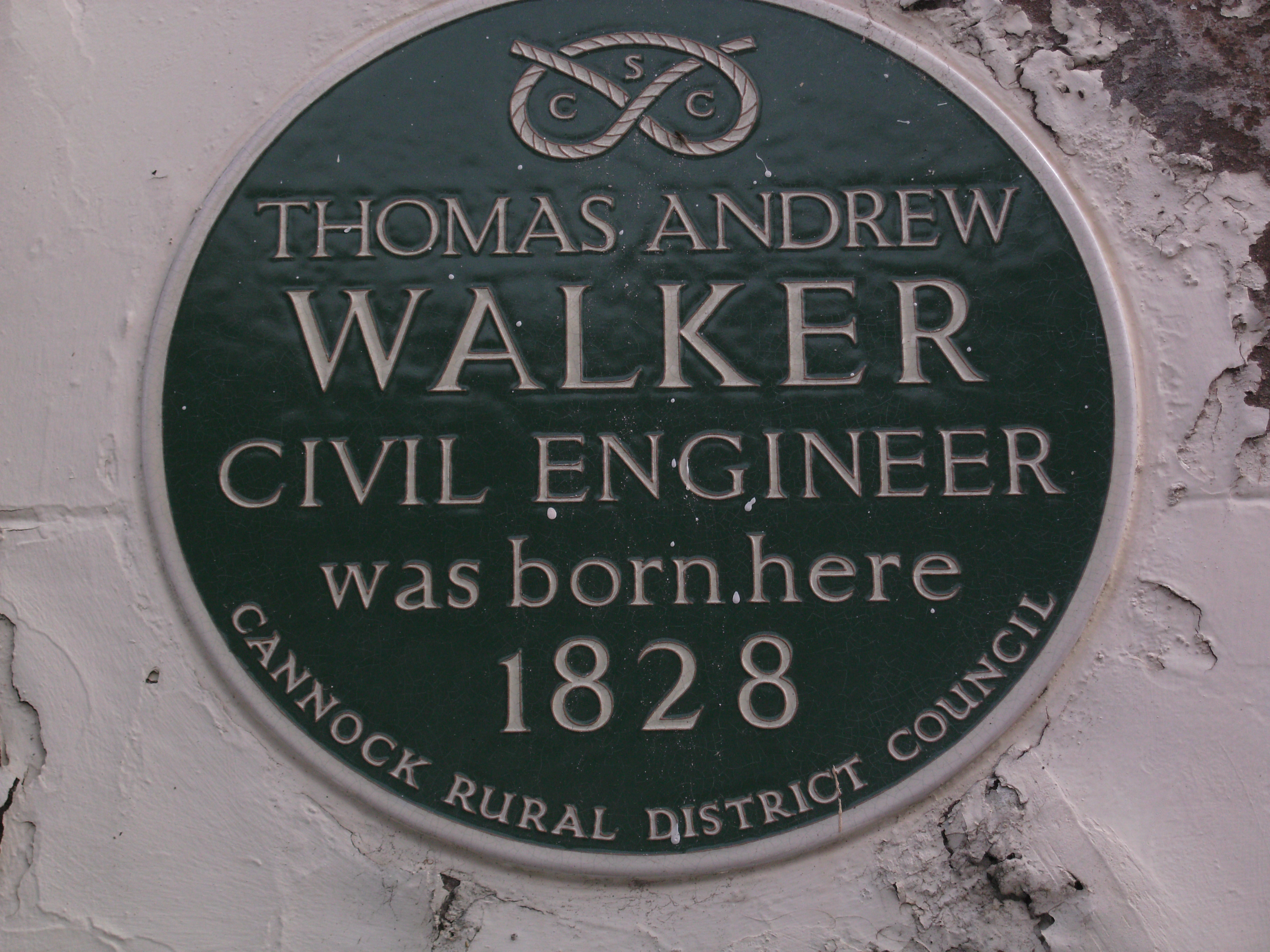
Walker's memorial plaque in Brewood.

== Early life and education ==
Thomas Andrew Walker was born at Brewood in Staffordshire, the eldest of the three children of Robert Walker and his third wife Ann Hay. His younger sister was Annie Louisa Walker. He had four half-sisters from his father`s first marriage, and one half-brother and one half-sister from his father`s second marriage. He was educated at Brewood Grammar School (1838–43) and then at King's College London until 1845. In 1852 he and his younger brother Charles sailed to Canada with their father where the three had been offered work by Thomas Brassey on the construction of the Grand Trunk Railway.

== Notable projects ==
After working on the Grand Trunk Railway of Canada for two years, Walker remained in Canada for a further seven years "constructing railways for the Governments of the Lower Provinces" However he had agreed to be paid in company stock, rather than in cash. This eventually left him bankrupt and he was forced to return to England.

Returning to Britain, he worked on extensive surveys in Russia, Egypt and Sudan. In 1865 he was offered, and accepted, the management of the construction of the Metropolitan District Railway in London on behalf of the three firms of contractors jointly responsible for that work. He then returned to being a public works contractor himself. He was in partnership with his younger brother until the latter`s death in 1874, and from then onwards operated without partners. The work of T. & C. Walker on the tunnel below the London Docks for East London Railway project (1871–74) greatly impressed the Engineer-in-chief Sir John Hawkshaw. In 1879 Walker was entrusted with the still more difficult work of completing the Severn Tunnel at the request of Sir John Hawkshaw. Walker was engaged for seven years in the construction of this tunnel. When he began work on the project he had already accumulated considerable experience in railway survey and construction throughout Canada, Russia, Egypt and England.

In writing his memoirs of his work on the Severn Tunnel he states: 'Sub-aqueous tunnels have recently become quite the fashion. One such experience as the Severn Tunnel, with its ever-varying and strangely contorted strata, and the dangers from floods above and floods below, has been sufficient for me. One sub-aqueous tunnel is quite enough for a lifetime.' The tunnel was completed in 1887, having a length of 4 miles 628 yards (7,012 m).

During the last five years of his life, Walker undertook four further large and complex projects. These were the Preston Dock; the Barry Dock and Railway; the contract for the Buenos Aires Harbour Works (with John Hawkshaw, resident engineer James Murray Dobson and Joseph Talbot engineer); and the Manchester Ship Canal.

Walker`s tender (of £456,600 11s. 2d.) to construct new docks at Preston for the Preston Corporation was accepted on 3 September 1884 and the first sod was turned on 11 October 1884. Increases in the dimensions of the projected docks plus various unanticipated engineering difficulties meant that by September 1887 the authorized borrowing powers of the Preston Corporation for the project were substantially below the estimated total cost figure for the project. Delays in the granting of Parliamentary approval for increased borrowing powers meant that construction work was halted in July 1888. Walker`s executors completed this project in 1892.

Walker`s tender to construct the Barry dock was accepted by the board of the Barry Dock and Railway company on 28 October 1884 after he had revised it downwards from £600,000 to £563,907 10s. In January 1886 the company`s board approved significant variations to the scope of the works under the dock contract, which added some £150,000 to the projected cost and a delay in the prescribed completion date. The dock was completed in 1889, with a ceremonial opening being held on 18 July 1889.

Walker`s contract to construct the Buenos Aires Harbour Works was entered into in September 1885. After the preparation of the various detailed plans the works were started in 1887. This included the construction of the village of Conchillas in Uruguay, across the River Plate from Buenos Aires, as a source of construction stone. This in turn required the construction of a fleet of hopper barges to carry the stone across, built by a Walker shipyard to be constructed at Sudbrook. Thomas Walker died in 1889, and the work at Buenos Aires was carried out by his nephew, Charles Hay Walker, who moved to a new villa in Conchillas. Construction was completed in 1897, the work having been continued after Walker`s death by his executors under powers obtained through a series of three private Acts of the British parliament. These were the Walker Estate Acts of 1891, 1894, and 1898.

Walker constructed the Barry Hotel in Wales. His final undertaking was the construction of the Manchester Ship Canal which has been described as the greatest engineering achievement of Victorian times. It is certainly an immense achievement and transformed an inland city into a major port. Walker was engaged as the sole contractor in charge of the construction in 1887, with the cutting of the first sod ceremony conducted on 11 November 1887. Walker divided the thirty-six-mile route into nine (soon consolidated to eight) sections and appointed an engineer to take charge of each. However, he died before the completion of this project. Management of work on the project then passed into the hands of the three executors of Walker`s will: Charles Hay Walker, Louis Philip Nott, and Thomas James Reeves, supported by Walker`s erstwhile legal and financial advisor Robert William Perks.

== Personal life ==
On 6 January 1852, he married Fanny Beetlestone at Shiffnal in Shropshire. The couple had two sons, both of whom died in infancy, and four daughters. Walker died of Bright's disease at Mount Ballan House in Caerwent, Monmouthshire, on 25 November 1889, the home he had bought while undertaking work on the Severn Tunnel. He was buried at St Stephen's Church in the village.

Walker was known to be an excellent employer, looking after the needs of his workforce as best he could and providing accommodation, meeting halls and hospital facilities. Upon his death, he left nearly £1 million.

His nephew, and son-in-law Charles Hay Walker (1860-1942), of Falkland Park, South Norwood was also a civil engineer and public works contractor. It was he who managed the contract for the Buenos Aires Harbour Works, during which time he established a home at Conchillas in Uruguay. After Thomas Andrew Walker's death, his contracts were continued by his Executors and subsequently the limited liability company C. H. Walker & Co Ltd. was formed to take over the various business assets. Thomas's nephew Charles Hay Walker was the chairman of this company. Charles Hay Walker did not maintain Thomas' reputation for good treatment of the workforce and a later project to expand the Royal Naval Dockyard in Bermuda was racked with strikes over conditions and broken promises.
