= Barry Hotel =

Barry, Vale of Glamorgan, Wales

Coordinates: 51.397682°N 3.284866°W

- Interactive map of the Barry Hotel area

General information
- Location: Broad Street and Windsor Road, Barry, Vale of Glamorgan, Wales, United Kingdom
- Year built: Circa 1890

Design and construction
- Main contractor: Thomas A. Walker

The Barry Hotel is a Grade II listed building in the Vale of Glamorgan, Wales. It stands on Broad Street in the town of Barry.

== History ==
The hotel was built in 1890. The building is constructed with red brick and bathstone dressings. It was built by Thomas A. Walker who was also responsible for other buildings along Broad Street. Walker is known as a contractor for the construction of the Manchester Ship Canal, Barry Docks, and the Severn Tunnel. The building now known as Windsor Court, was converted into 26 apartments.

== Gallery ==
The Barry Hotel under restoration in 2006

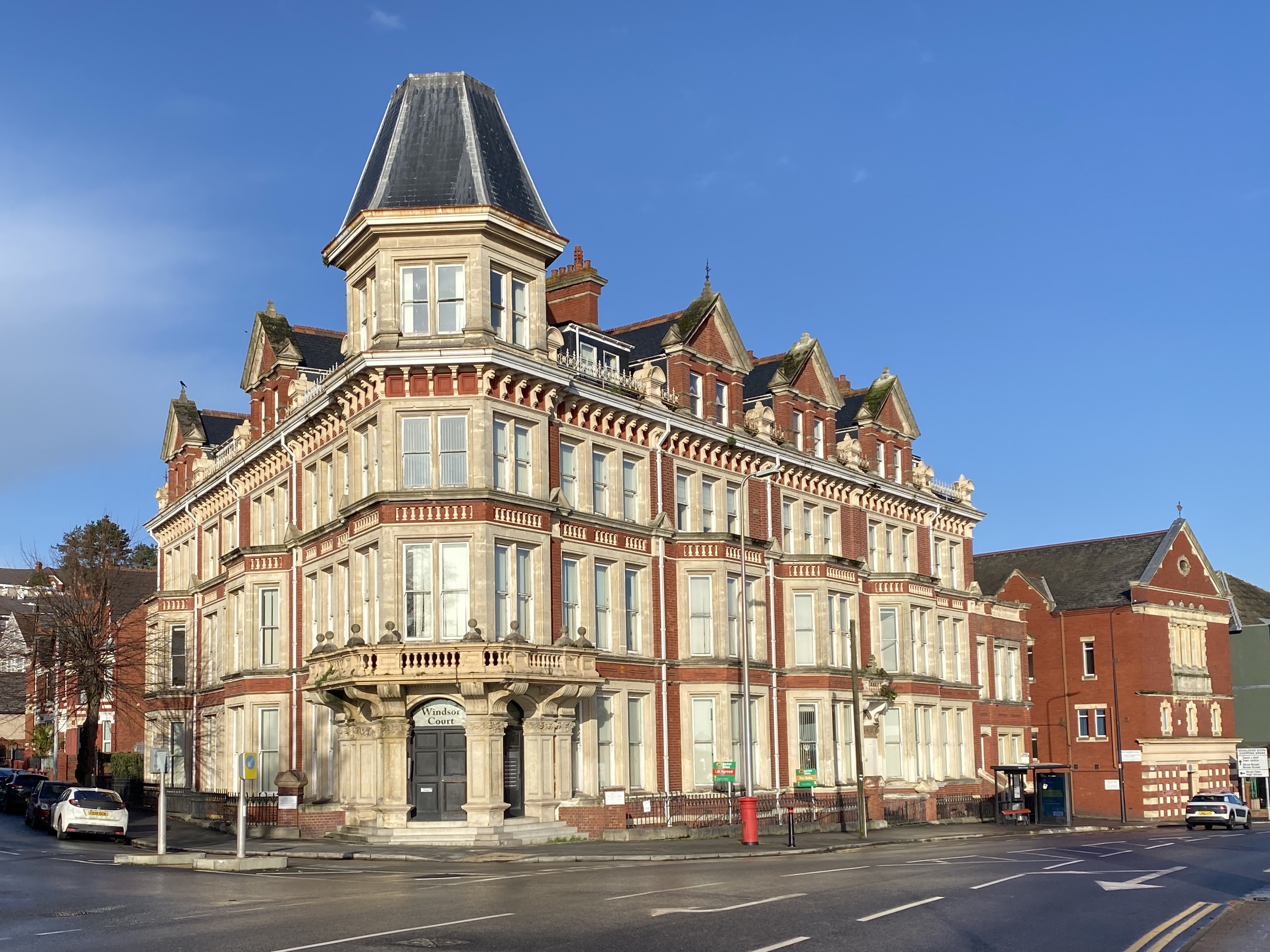
Windsor Court formerly the Barry Hotel
