= Portskewett =

Village and community in Monmouthshire, Wales

Portskewett: Welsh: Porthsgiwed / Porthysgewin
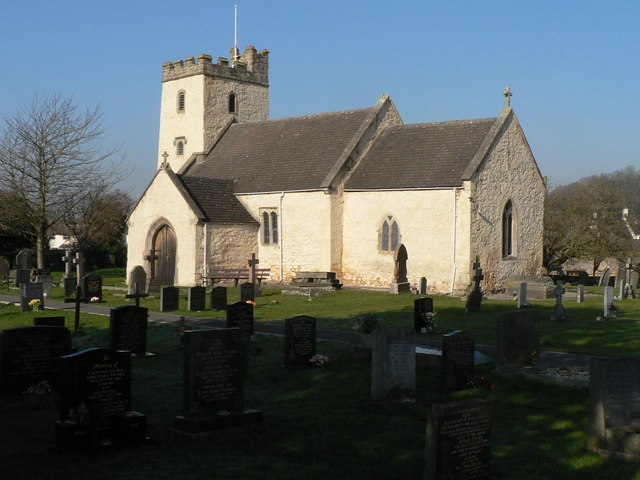
- Parish church of St. Mary

- Location within Monmouthshire
- Population: 2,133 (2011)
- OS grid reference: ST499881
- Principal area: Monmouthshire
- Preserved county: Gwent
- Country: Wales
- Sovereign state: United Kingdom
- Post town: CALDICOT
- Postcode district: NP26
- Dialling code: 01291
- Police: Gwent
- Fire: South Wales
- Ambulance: Welsh
- UK Parliament: Monmouth
- List of places UK Wales Monmouthshire 51.590°N 2.7251°W Map of the community

Portskewett (Welsh: Porthsgiwed or Porthysgewin) is a village and community (parish) in Monmouthshire, south east Wales. It is located four miles south west of Chepstow and one mile east of Caldicot, in an archaeologically sensitive part of the Caldicot Levels on the Welsh shore of the Severn Estuary. The Second Severn Crossing passes overhead carrying the M4 motorway. The community includes Sudbrook, Crick and Leechpool.

== History and prehistory ==
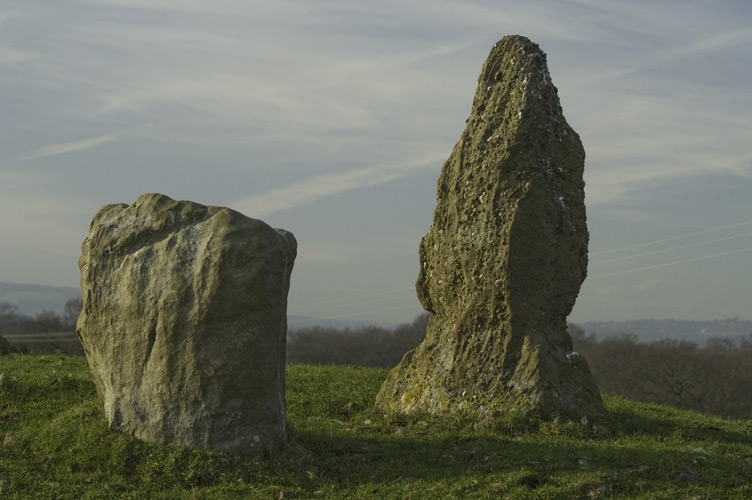
Heston Brake puddingstones

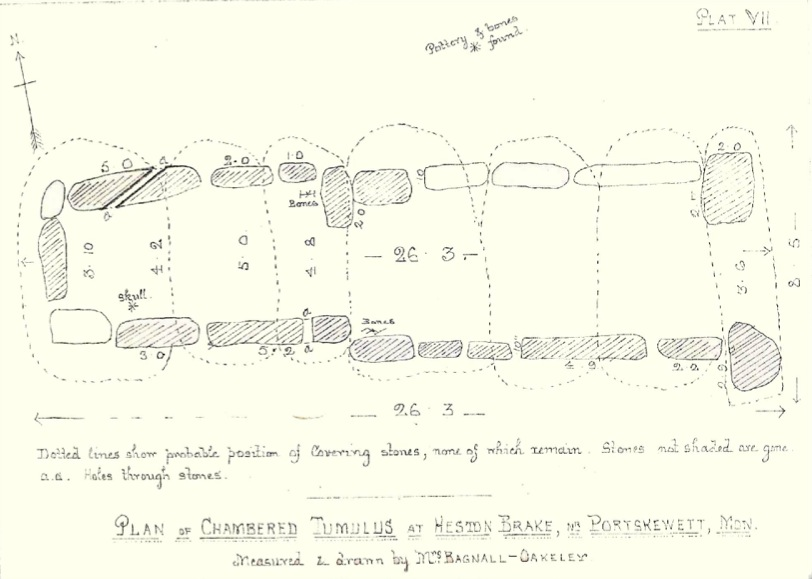
Plan of chambered tumulus at Heston Brake, by Mary Ellen Bagnall Oakeley (1888)

=== Heston Brake ===
At the eastern edge of the village, in a privately owned field opposite Black Rock Road, very near to the Leechpool turn, is evidence of a significant neolithic chambered tomb or long barrow. A small group of puddingstones mark the entrance of the site known as Heston Brake. Human skeletons, cattle bones and some pottery were discovered in the chamber when it was excavated in 1888.

The stones can be reached by following the public footpath accessed via the kissing gate which is situated on the left about 150 metres (160 yd) from the main road toward Leechpool. In his 1954 Monmouthshire Sketch Book Hando writes: "Garn Llwyd, Gwern-y-Cleppa and Heston Brake are our three outstanding dolmens".

=== Roman remains ===
There is some evidence of a Roman villa, with possible British Iron Age antecedents. There are also remains of a late Roman temple on Portskewett Hill, and many coins of the 3rd and 4th centuries have been found.

=== Early Welsh history ===
The name Portskewett is generally believed to derive from the Welsh Porth-is-Coed, meaning "the harbour below the wood", or alternatively "the harbour of the area below the wood" - that is, the post-Roman cantref of Gwent Is Coed, centred on Caerwent about 3 miles away. An alternative derivation is from Porth Ysgewydd, the port of the elder wood.

According to tradition, in about the 6th century Caradog Freichfras, king of Gwent, moved his llys or court from Caerwent to Portskewett, where there was a strongly flowing fresh water spring which only dried up later when the Severn Tunnel was built. Alternatively, the court may have been based at nearby Sudbrook.

Portskewett is mentioned in ancient Welsh stories as one of the three chief ports of Wales. A Welsh poem of around the 7th century, Moliant Cadwallon, describes it as "beautiful Porth Esgewin, the estuary on the border", and the medieval Welsh phrase meaning from one end of the country to another translates as "from Porth Wygyr to Portskewett". The harbour later silted up. It is now a marshy area at Caldicot Pill, close to the Second Severn Crossing and industrial sites, and crossed by power cables and railway lines, including the entrance to the Severn Tunnel. Archaeological investigations have revealed wetland structures, including fish traps, with dates from the 6th century onwards.

=== The tradition of "King Harold's Palace" ===
The uneven ground south of the village church is shown on some older maps as "Harold’s Field". According to the Anglo-Saxon Chronicle, in 1065 Earl Harold of Wessex, having defeated Gruffydd ap Llywelyn and conquered areas around Hereford and down the Wye, and was in the process of constructing a building on the site which he could use as a base for hunting when it was attacked and destroyed by a force under Caradog ap Gruffydd, King of Gwent. Harold never had the opportunity to take his revenge; in January 1066 he became king of England, and later that year was killed at the Battle of Hastings. Archaeologists consider it likely that the hunting lodge would have been built on the same site as Caradog Freichfras' earlier court.

A geophysical survey carried out at the end of 2005 revealed extensive remains in the area. In May 2007, an excavation was carried out for the Channel 4 TV programme Time Team, broadcast on 30 March 2008. The excavation revealed that a Norman fortified tower house had existed on the site, probably contemporaneous with the nearby church, and reached by a creek off the Severn. However, no conclusive evidence was found of a Saxon building, which would have been built of wood.

=== Later history ===
After the Norman conquest the area became a "hardwick" or cattle ranch. The parish church of St Mary is a Grade I listed building. The original parts of the church date back to the late 11th century and are made of local limestone; the carved crosses on the blocked up back doorway could be even older. The church has been restored and altered on a number of occasions. The small windows in the upper part of the tower, for example, are typical of the 16th century. In the corner of the churchyard can be seen the steps which formed the base of a medieval churchyard cross.

From Norman times until 1919, the village was part of the St. Pierre estate, and was held by the Lewis family of St. Pierre. It declined in importance after the Norman period and for many centuries it was an agricultural village of no distinction, although it does appear that some iron mining continued near the village until at least the 17th century. In 1662 Thomas Lewis of St. Pierre, lord of the manor, granted the right to mine iron in the manor to Henry Rumsey.

By the 19th century the village was in decline. Between 1801 and 1861 the population of the parish, which includes Sudbrook, fell from 216 to 175. However, it expanded rapidly later in the 19th century, as housing was built for workers on the Severn Tunnel and with industrial development at nearby Caldicot. At the turn of the 20th century the population was some 900, steadily rising to about 1,300 by the 1970s. The village lost its railway station (on the Newport to Gloucester line) when it was closed under the Beeching Axe in 1964.

== Black Rock ==
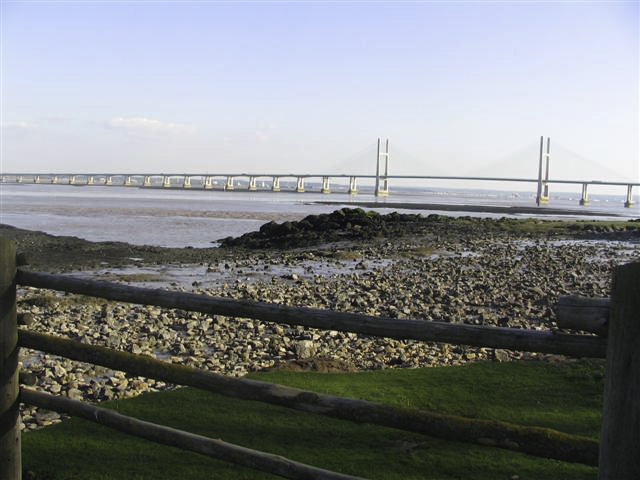
Severn Bridge as viewed from Black Rock

Black Rock, on the Severn Estuary immediately south east of the village, has been an important crossing point of the River Severn for many centuries. Numerous coins found in the mud show that it was in constant use throughout the Roman period, on the route between Aquae Sulis (Bath) and Venta Silurum (Caerwent).

=== New Passage Ferry ===
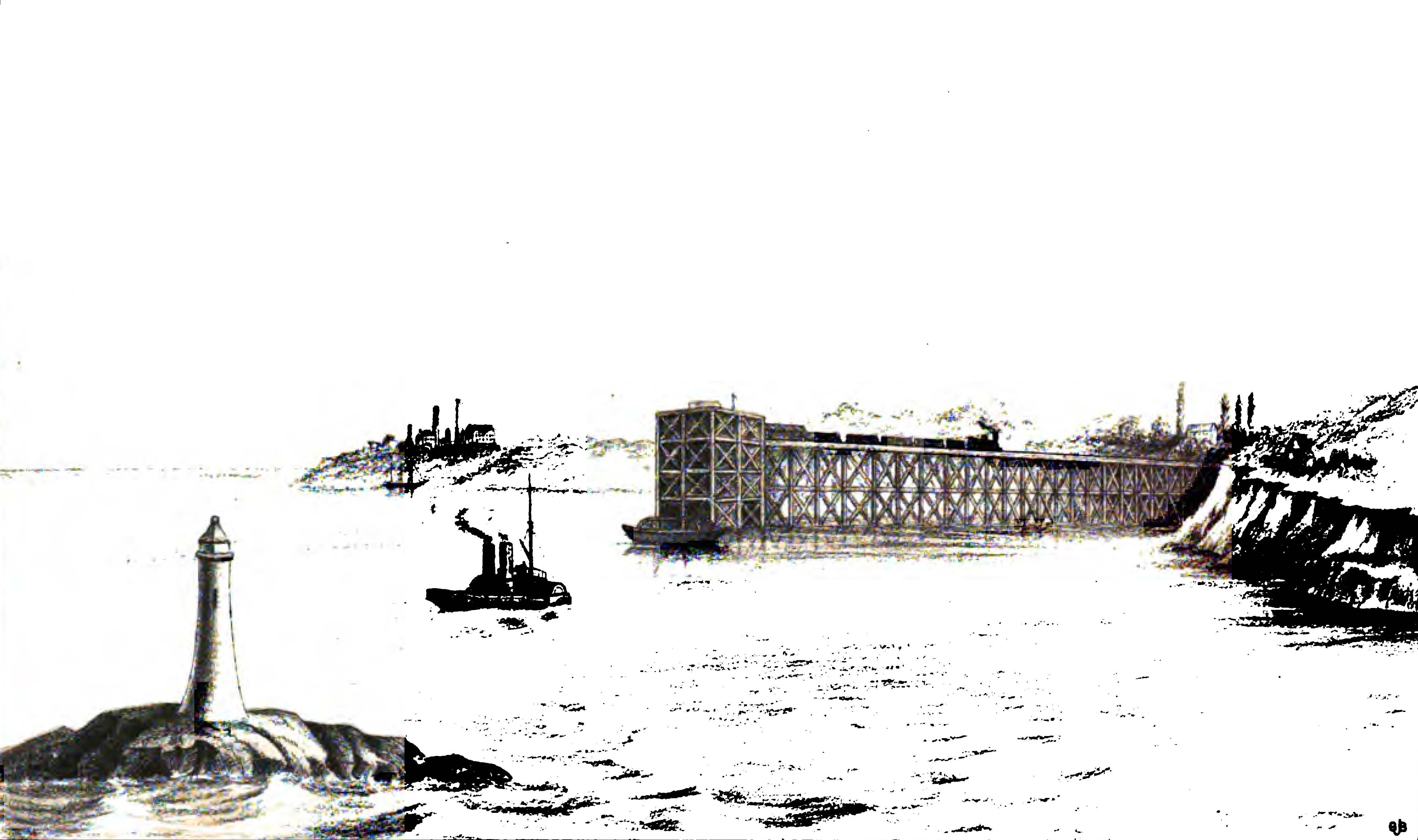
Bristol and South Wales Union Railway pier

By the 18th century, a regular ferry service crossed the Severn estuary from Black Rock to New Passage on the Bristol side, carrying passengers, cattle and iron ore. The Black Rock Hotel served travellers and became a popular local entertainment venue; it was later destroyed by fire. In 1863, the Bristol and South Wales Union Railway built a branch from the main line to Black Rock. Trains would travel out onto a wooden pier, where the passengers would get off before climbing aboard the ferries. The pier was severely damaged by fire in 1881 and demolished after the Severn Tunnel opened in 1886, but parts can still be seen at low tide.

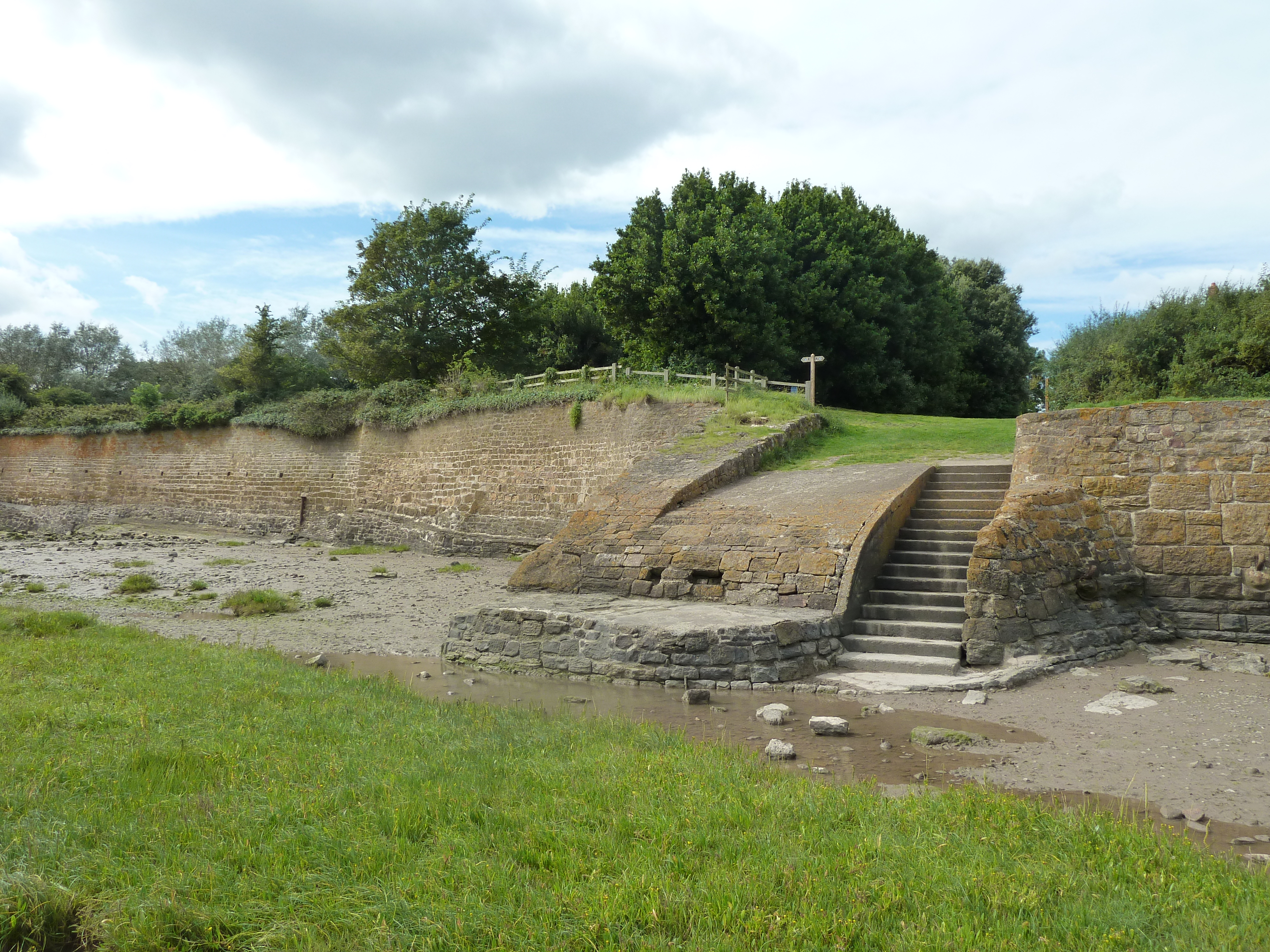
Sea wall remains today

=== Lave net fishery ===
At Black Rock a traditional method of fishing for salmon with lave nets is practised. The fishermen, who come from local villages, are the last such in Wales. They actively promote the fishery as a tourist attraction, with the aim of maintaining its history and tradition. Demonstrations of the lave net fishing are given on certain days from the picnic site.

The estuary has one of the highest tidal ranges in the world (traditionally reported as the second highest though more recently reckoned to be third highest), which enables the fishermen to wade out at low tide with nets on shoulders to traditional fishing grounds, with the water up to their waists. The net is then opened and lowered into the outgoing tide which rushes through the net. With his fingers placed at the bottom meshes of the net, the fisherman then waits for the fish to hit the net. The net is made in a traditional way by means of a Y-shaped structure consisting of two arms called rimes which are made from locally cut willow that acts as a frame work to the loosely hung net. The handle is called the rock staff and is made of ash or willow and the arms are hinged to the rock staff and are kept in position while fishing with a wooden spreader called the headboard.

In 2020 the lave fishermen of Black Rock were featured on BBC One's Countryfile programme. In 2021, the fishermen reduced their activities as a result of what they claimed to be unfair pressure from Natural Resources Wales to reduce their catch.

== Governance ==
Portskewett is also the name of the electoral ward, coterminous with the community. The ward elects a county councillor to Monmouthshire County Council. The Welsh Conservatives' Peter Fox has been councillor since 1999 and is leader of the county council.

== Bibliography ==
- Smith, Richard (2013). Portskewett Railways. CreateSpace Independent Publishing Platform. ISBN 978-1491294031.
