= Church of St Stephen and St Tathan, Caerwent =

Coordinates: 51.6107°N 2.7686°W

Church of St Stephen and St Tathan (or Tatheus)
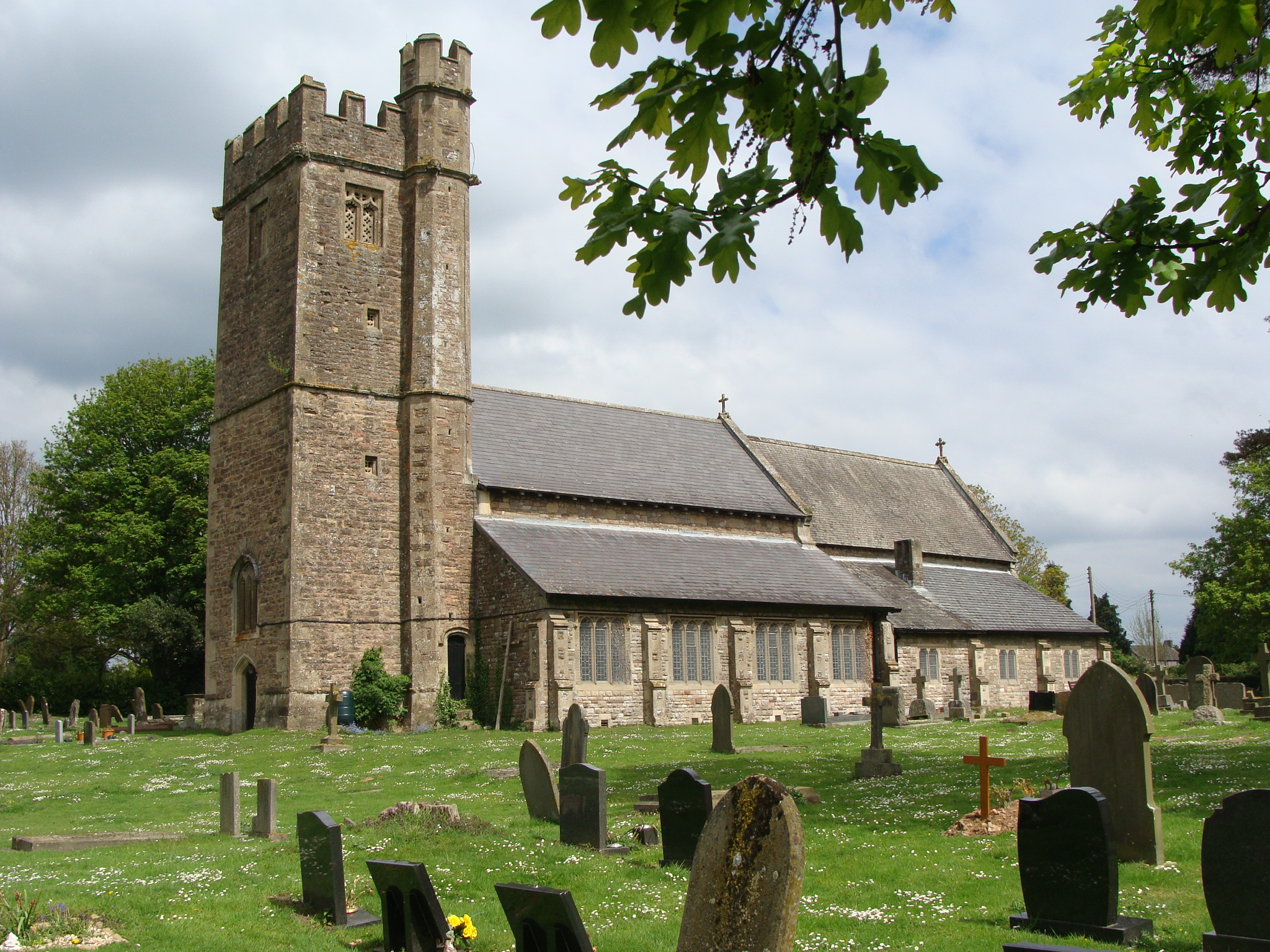
- "a veritable treasure-house of Roman history"

- Location in Monmouthshire
- Location: Caerwent, Monmouthshire
- Country: Wales
- Denomination: Church in Wales

History
- Status: Parish church
- Founded: C13th century

Architecture
- Functional status: Active
- Heritage designation: Grade II*
- Designated: 19 August 1955
- Architectural type: Church
- Style: Perpendicular

Administration
- Diocese: Monmouth
- Archdeaconry: Monmouth
- Deanery: Netherwent
- Parish: Caerwent and Dinham

Clergy
- Vicar: The Rev'd Sally Ingle-Gillis (Priest-in-Charge)

The Church of St Stephen and St Tathan, Caerwent, Monmouthshire, is a parish church with datable origins to the 13th century. It is believed to be one of the oldest Christian sites in the county, and possibly within Wales. The church is sited within the walls of the Roman town. It remains an active parish church and a Grade II* listed building.

== History ==
It is possible that a very early Christian congregation worshipped at Caerwent in the Roman period, although there is no evidence that this settlement was on the site of the present church. In 1992, a pre-Norman cross-head was discovered near the site indicating the presence of a Christian church predating the Norman Conquest. The oldest part of the existing church is the chancel, dating from the 13th century. The church was restored in 1893–1894 and again in 1910–1912 by G. E. Halliday. It remains an active church in the parish of Caerwent and Dinham and is a Grade II* listed building.

== Architecture and description ==
The church is built of limestone, some local to the area and some imported from Somerset. It contains a significant number of Roman artefacts, including an altar dedicated to the god Mars, dating from AD 152.
