= Sudbrook, Monmouthshire =

Coordinates: 51.5818°N 2.7157°W

Sudbrook
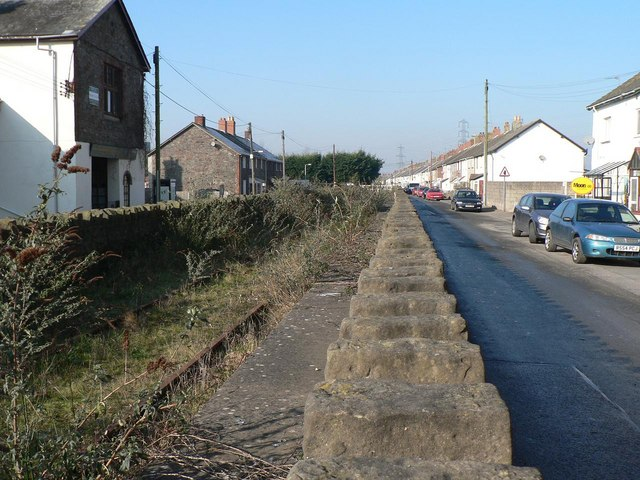
- Sudbrook showing the line of the old branch railway which divides the village

- Location within Monmouthshire
- OS grid reference: ST502876
- Principal area: Monmouthshire
- Preserved county: Gwent
- Country: Wales
- Sovereign state: United Kingdom
- Post town: CALDICOT
- Postcode district: NP26
- Dialling code: 01291
- Police: Gwent
- Fire: South Wales
- Ambulance: Welsh
- UK Parliament: Monmouth

Sudbrook is a village in Monmouthshire, south east Wales. It is located 4 miles south west of Chepstow and 1 mile east of Caldicot. It lies close to the Second Severn Crossing on the Severn Estuary, and adjoins the village of Portskewett. It was largely built in the late 19th century for workers on the Severn railway tunnel. At that time it was also known as Southbrook.

== History ==
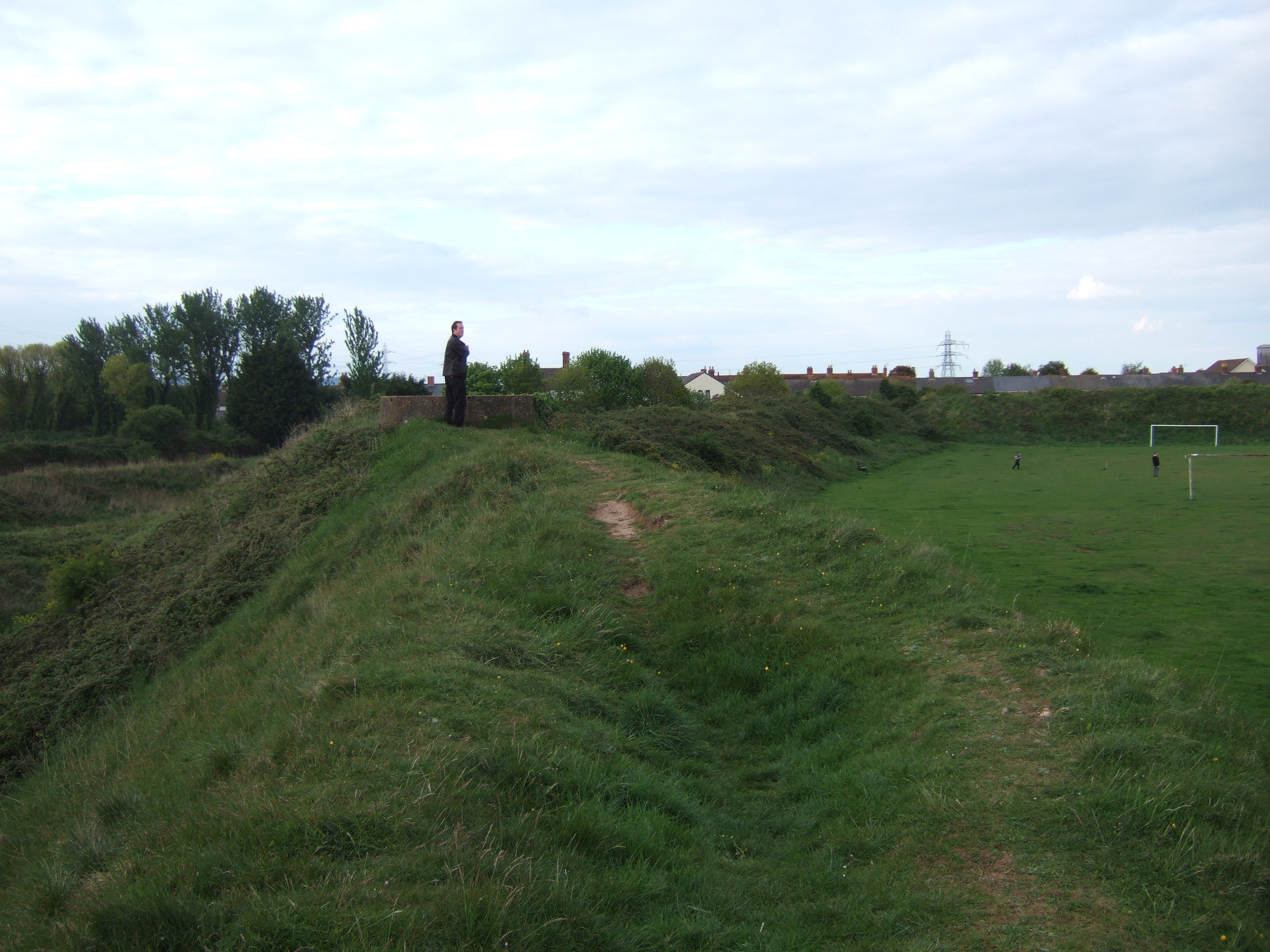
View of the hillfort, showing part of the ramparts

=== Sudbrook hill fort ===
Sudbrook was of early historic importance in guarding the Severn estuary at an ancient ferry crossing place. An Iron Age hillfort is located on the coast, probably built and occupied by the Silures from the 2nd century BC and occupied by the Romans from the 1st century AD until the 4th century. The hillfort was originally much bigger than now having been eroded over the centuries. Finds of Roman coins at Black Rock, Portskewett, show that the ferry crossing was in use in Roman times, on the route between the Roman stations of Aquae Sulis (Bath) and Venta Silurum (Caerwent).

According to tradition, Caradog Freichfras, the Welsh ruler of Gwent in the 5th century or 6th century AD, moved his court from Caerwent to the Portskewett area, possibly to the fort.

=== Holy Trinity Church ===
The ruined Holy Trinity church stands near the Severn cliff. It has mostly fallen into the sea over the centuries. The nave walls date from the 12th century; the chancel was added in the 14th century and the south porch in the 15th century. The preaching cross which is now inside the church was originally outside and was probably moved to prevent it falling into the sea as the cliff eroded. The area around the church was probably the site of the original medieval village. A manor house and other village buildings stood nearby but later moved inland, probably when climate changes in the 14th and 15th centuries led to the widening of the estuary and the erosion of the cliff. By 1720 the church had fallen down and much of the churchyard had fallen into the river with human bones from the graves often being found on the shore.

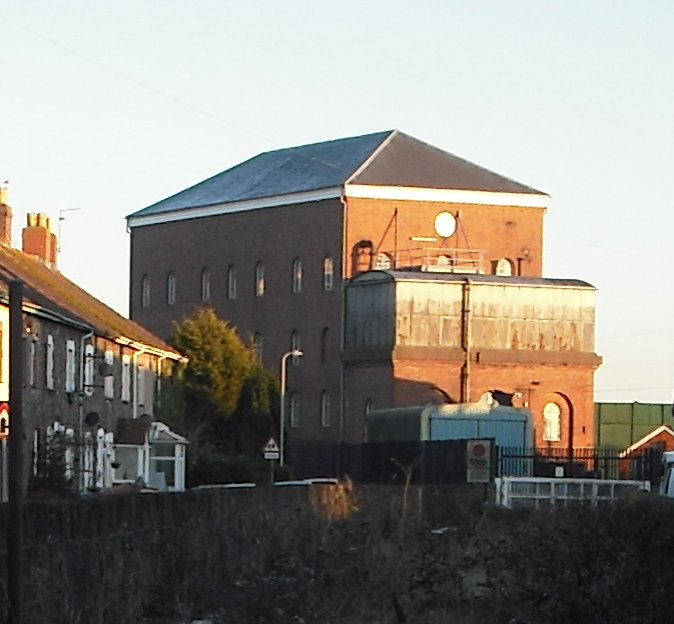
Severn Tunnel old pump house

=== Sudbrook village and the Severn Tunnel ===
Most of contemporary Sudbrook was built further inland by the Great Western Railway as a company town for workers on the Severn Tunnel below, which began construction in 1873. The first cottages were built by contractor Thomas A. Walker in 1877, and rapid development took place over the next decade, including a school, post office, mission hall and infirmary. Some of the houses - originally known as Concrete Row - are believed to be the first concrete houses built in Britain.

Also built was a large pumping station, required to pump water from the tunnel, including three large brick engine houses housing six steam engines, and ventilation towers. A branch line was built from the nearby Gloucester-Newport line to supply the pumping station with coal and engineering equipment, but fell into disuse in the early 2000s, and has now been disconnected from the main line. The steam engines were replaced by electric motors in 1962, and the chimney stacks taking smoke from the furnaces were demolished in 1968.

After the Severn Tunnel was opened in 1886, Walker started a shipbuilding business at Sudbrook, using the same labour force. This continued in operation, building steamers of up to 700 tonnes, until 1922.

Between 1958 and 2006, local employment in the village was provided by a large paper mill, which made use of water from the tunnel. It was demolished in 2009.

== Sudbrook Cricket Club ==
Sudbrook Cricket Club was formed during the 1860s. It is believed that in the 1870s cricket was played at Black Rock, where W. G. Grace played against Sudbrook for a Bristol team. The team later played matches within the Iron Age camp, before moving several times, eventually to Caldicot where it remains. The club achieved league status in the 1970s, and currently plays in Division One of the Glamorgan and Monmouthshire Cricket League.

== Amenities ==
In 2002 Ysgol y Ffin, one of only two Welsh language based primary schools in Monmouthshire, was established in the old school building at Sudbrook. However, in 2008 the school outgrew the site and moved to Sandy Lane in Caldicot.

== See also ==
- Portskewett
- New Passage
