= Caerwent =

Human settlement in Monmouthshire, Wales

Caerwent: Welsh: Caer-went
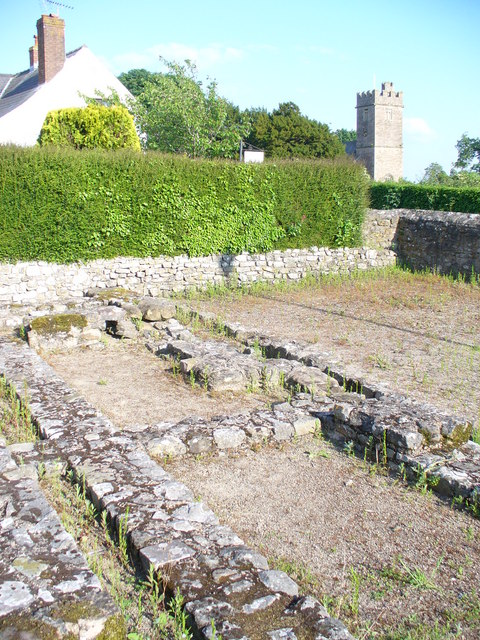
- Roman building foundations and the tower of Caerwent parish church

- Location within Monmouthshire
- Population: 1,791 (2011)
- OS grid reference: ST470905
- Principal area: Monmouthshire
- Preserved county: Gwent
- Country: Wales
- Sovereign state: United Kingdom
- Post town: CHEPSTOW
- Postcode district: NP16
- Post town: CALDICOT
- Postcode district: NP26
- Dialling code: 01291
- Police: Gwent
- Fire: South Wales
- Ambulance: Welsh
- UK Parliament: Monmouthshire
- List of places UK Wales Monmouthshire 51°36′41″N 2°46′07″W Map of the community

Caerwent (Welsh: Caer-went) is a village and community in Monmouthshire, Wales. It is located about 5 mi (8.0 km) west of Chepstow and 11 mi (18 km) east of Newport. It was founded by the Romans as the market town of Venta Silurum, an important settlement of the Brythonic tribe of Silures. The modern village is built around the Roman ruins, which are some of the best-preserved in Europe. It remained prominent through the Roman era and Early Middle Ages as the site of a road crossing between several important civic centres. The community includes the small village of Llanvair Discoed. In 2021 Caerwent village had a population of about 1,200.

== Etymology ==
The modern name derives from Venta, an ancient British word denoting a "market", and Caer, a later Welsh word denoting a fortified settlement. The town would give its name to the post Roman successor kingdom of Gwent.

Romans writers recorded the town as Venta Silurum to distinguish it from the other tribal markets in Britain such as Venta Belgarum (modern Winchester) and Venta Icenorum (modern Caistor St Edmund).

== History ==
=== Roman times ===
Caerwent was founded by the Romans in AD 75 as a market town for the defeated Silures tribe. This is confirmed by inscriptions on the "Civitas Silurum" stone, now on display in the parish church. Large sections of the Roman town walls are still in place, rising up to 5 metres (16 ft) high in places. Historian John Newman has described the walls as: "easily the most impressive town defence to survive from Roman Britain, and in its freedom from later rebuilding one of the most perfectly preserved in Northern Europe." In 1881, a portion of a highly intricate coloured floor mosaic or tessellated pavement, depicting different types of fish, was unearthed during excavations in the garden of a cottage.

Excavations in 1971 dated the north-west polygonal angle-tower to the mid-300s. Further excavations were carried out in 2008 by Wessex Archaeology and was featured in the Channel 4 TV programme Time Team.

Modern houses are built on top of half the site of the old Roman market place. The ruins of several Roman buildings are still visible, including the foundations of a 4th-century Roman temple with a Temenos area. The rudimentary quality of most of the houses, few of which had mosaic or hypocaust-heated floors, indicates that, although a large settlement, Caerwent did not attain the importance or sophistication of other Romano-British tribal capitals.

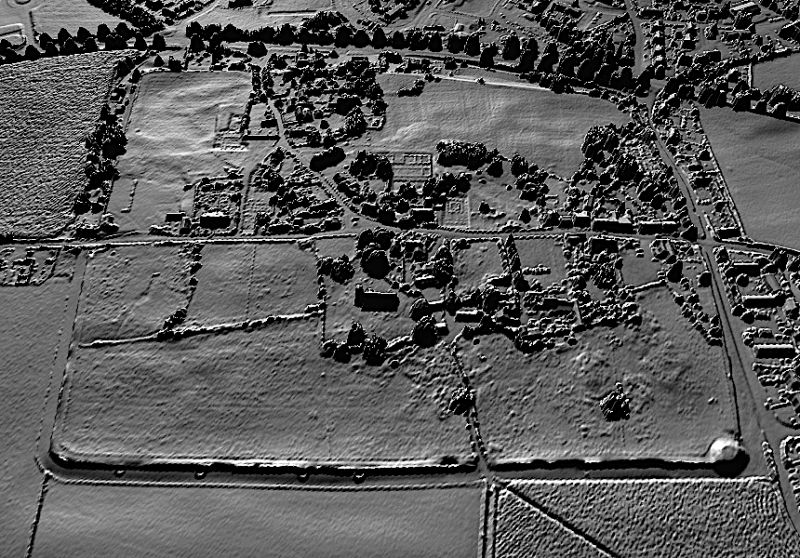
A lidar view of the area enclosed by the town's wall.

=== Early Christian times ===
Caerwent was sometimes postulated a centre for the Kingdom of Gwent after the Roman occupation. The name Caerwent translates from Welsh as "fort of Venta", and the name Gwent derives from the Roman name Venta (Silurum). The English town name of Winchester has a parallel derivation, ultimately from the combination of the Latin words Venta, in that case, Venta Belgarum, and castra.

Caerwent remained an important centre, where the road between Gloucester and Caerleon met the north–south road from Shrewsbury, via Monmouth and Trellech, to the sea at Portskewett. Excavations at Caerwent have revealed remains and everyday objects from the post-Roman period. Metalwork, including elaborate penannular brooches and fastening pins, have been dated to the 5th–7th centuries. A large number of Christian burials, some stone-lined, dating from between the 4th and 9th centuries have also been discovered, both around the town's East Gate and close to the parish church. It has been suggested that it may have been the birthplace of Saint Patrick.

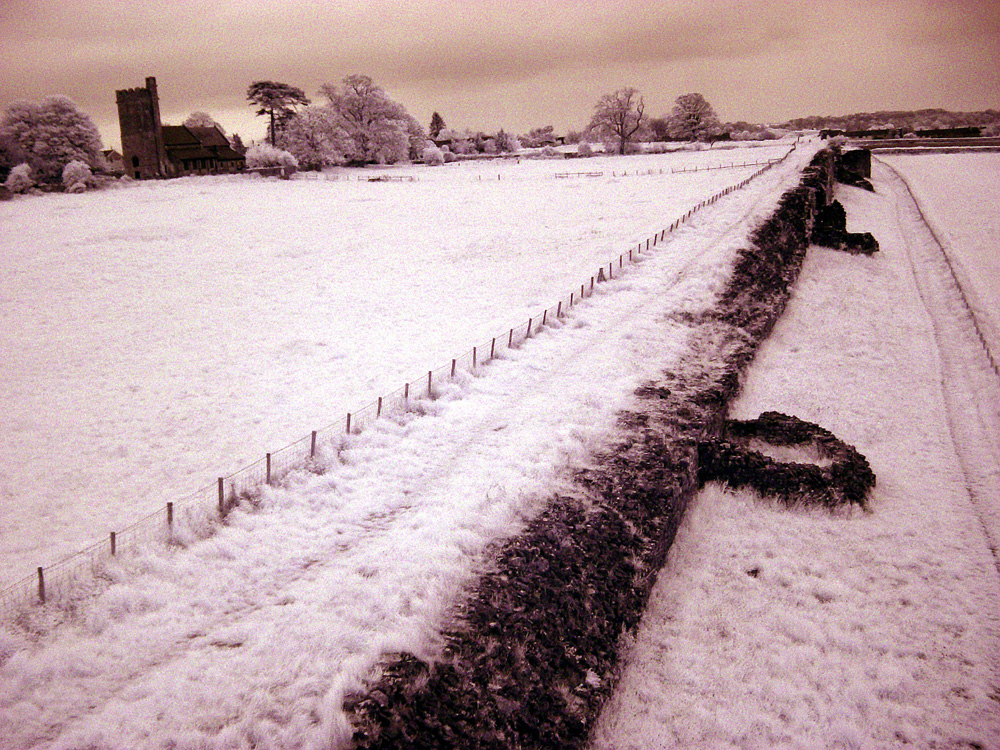
Near infra-red kite aerial photo of the south wall of Caerwent

A monastery was established at Caerwent some time before the 10th century, and a pre-Norman cross head was discovered at the site in 1992. The Church of St Stephen and St Tathan is dedicated to Saints Stephen and Tathan, the latter name possibly having arisen through confusion with Saint Tathyw. The oldest existing part of the church dates to the 13th century.

The village appears as "Venta Siluru" and "Caer went" on the Cambriae Typus map of 1573.

== Modern era ==
During World War II, a Royal Navy Propellant Factory was established at Caerwent, immediately north of the A48 road. Between 1967 and 1993, this was used as a storage station for the Royal Air Force and the United States Army; since that time it has been used as an army training facility and on occasion as a filming location for TV episodes such as Doctor Who "Before the Flood" and large-scale productions such as Captain America: The First Avenger.

Caerwent is now a small village, largely bypassed by the busy A48 road running between the city of Newport to the west and Chepstow to the east. The Northgate Inn closed in 2013, leaving the Coach and Horses as the only village pub. The Post Office thrives and was recently refitted. The village has a garage which has been repairing cars since 1917.

== Governance ==
An electoral ward in the same name exists. The area and population of this ward are identical to that of the parish.

== See also ==
- Nedern Brook Wetlands
