= Wigpool =

Nature reserve in Gloucestershire, England

Wigpool Common
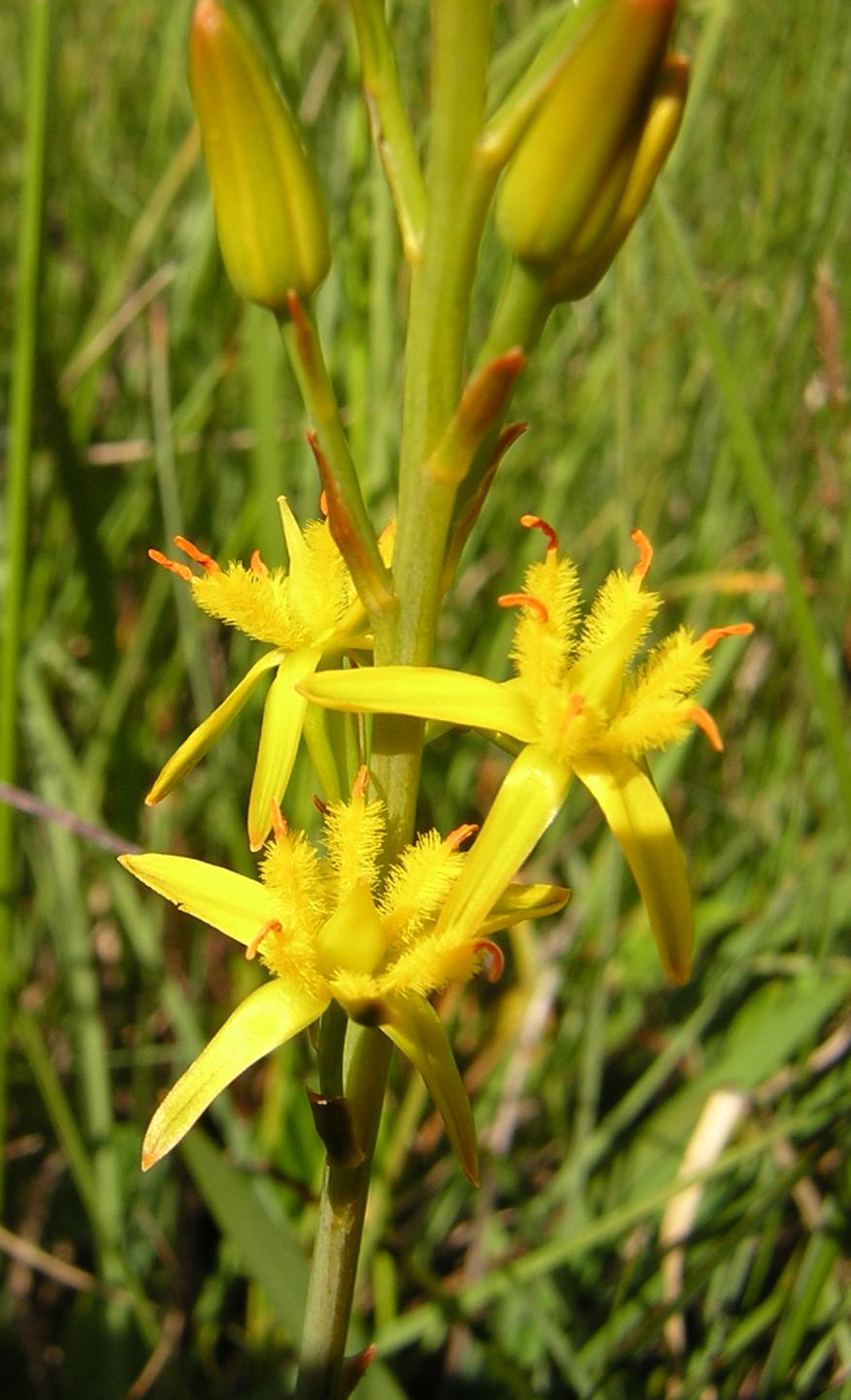
- Example - bog asphodel (Narthecium ossifragum)

- Location within Gloucestershire
- Type: Gloucestershire Wildlife Trust nature reserve
- Location: near Mitcheldean
- Coordinates: 51°52′27.59″N 2°30′22.2″W
- Area: 18.5 acres (7.5 ha)
- Created: 1967/68 Wigpool & Pit House Pond and Bog, 2009 (absorbed into Wigpool)
- Operator: Gloucestershire Wildlife Trust Forestry Commission
- Status: Open all year

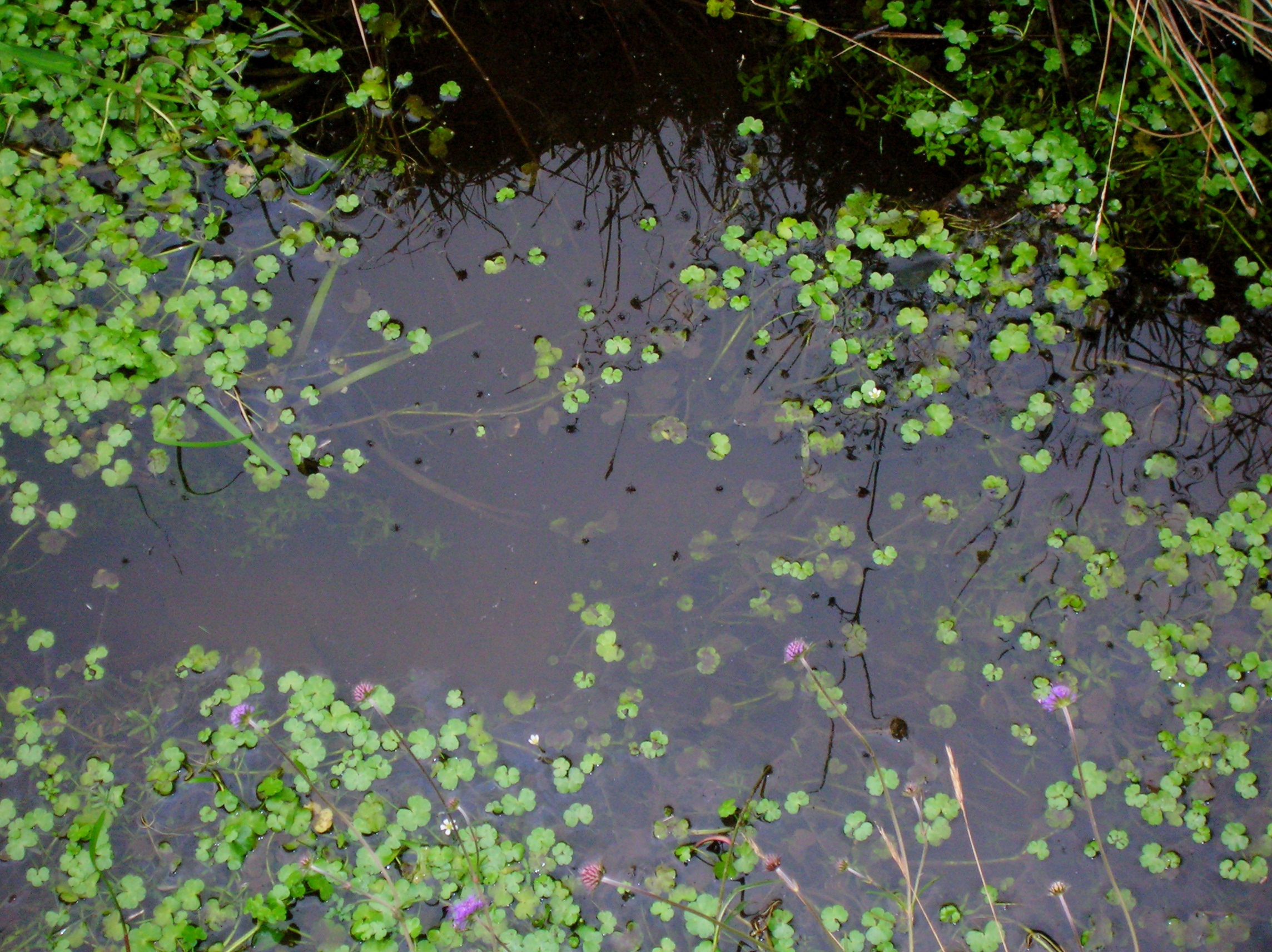
Example - marsh pennywort (Hydrocotyle vulgaris)

Wigpool (grid reference SO652196) is a 7.5-hectare (19-acre) nature reserve in Gloucestershire in the Forest of Dean, England.

The site is managed jointly by the Gloucestershire Wildlife Trust and the Forestry Commission by agreement with the Forestry Commission. Originally the Trust held two separate nature reserves under lease from the commission. The revised agreement for a single reserve, called Wigpool, operates from 2009, but involvement with the two separate areas goes back to 1967/68. There was a formal agreement for Pit House Pond and Bog in 1978. The site (both original parts) is listed in the 'Forest of Dean Local Plan Review' as a Key Wildlife Site (KWS).

== Location and site ==
The reserve is within a large conifer plantation and about one mile north-west of Mitcheldean. These are the remnants of the acidic bog and heathland which used to cover most of Wigpool Common, and records have been traced back to the late 13th century. It has been an open area until relatively recently. The reserve now includes two pools, the larger one being the original Wigpool and the smaller pond being Pit House pond. Felling of the conifer has contributed to a heathland restoration programme and has resulted in a reserve of a much increased area.

The Common lies on a high plateau and the bigger pool is in a depression. The Coal Measures at this point are overlain by glacial head, which is a silty, clay substance. This produces an acidic, peaty soil. This is an area which cannot be fenced in as it is bound by Commoners Rights in the statutory Forest of Dean.

The big pool was drained during the conifer planting in the mid-1950s, and work was done by volunteers to assist its re-establishment in 1970. This was carried out by damming drainage ditches. The smaller pond was dug in about 1840. It was created for Wigpool Iron Mine No.1. That mine became disused in 1893.

There is a bund on the east of the north–south public road. This was created by scraping off topsoil.

The reserve is close to two other Trust reserves being Plump Hill Dolomite Quarry (to the south) and Hobbs Quarry (to the east). The latter is a Site of Special Scientific Interest. Wigpool Ironstone Mine, which is also a Site of Special Scientific Interest, is on its eastern boundary.

== Flora ==
The reserve supports a diverse range of heathland, bog and aquatic plants.

Marsh varieties of plants include marsh pennywort, lesser spearwort, marsh speedwell, common marsh-bedstraw, floating sweet-grass and various types of sedge. Where there are drier areas at the edge of the water, purple moor-grass, common bent, tufted hair-grass and various rushes flourish. Uncommon bog asphodel is present and is recorded as an increasing population.

Aquatic varieties of plants include floating club-rush.

Recorded are heath violet and heath rush. There is a range of sphagnum mosses present.

Bilberry, alder and grey willow grow throughout the reserve. The heathland supports western gorse, creeping willow, cross-leaved heath, bell heather and bramble. Open areas have been colonised by birch.

Sundew species, which are native to the county, are thought once to have flourished on this reserve, but have not been recorded for several decades.

== Fauna ==
Nesting birds include mallard. Common frog, palmate newt and smooth newt breed in the pools. Dragonflies recorded include four-spotted chaser, broad-bodied chaser, southern hawker, brown hawker, emperor, common darter and the small red damselfly.

== Conservation ==
Support of the heathland restoration project requires flail cutting of gorse and birch scrub, and the cutting of regenerating birch manually.

Key for the larger pond is maintaining high water levels by ensuring damming and drains, which flow into the pool, remain in good order. Encroaching alder and willow scrub are cleared from the marsh and pool margins. The site is kept as open as possible to encourage plant life.

Key for the smaller pond is ensuring good drainage and controlling the purple moor-grass tussocks.

Heather must be cut at intervals to maintain good regrowth.

== Walks ==
There is a publication which details places to visit for recreation, and for observing particular wildlife in this part of the Forest of Dean.

== Publications ==
- Kelham, A, Sanderson, J, Doe, J, Edgeley-Smith, M, et al., 1979, 1990, 2002 editions, 'Nature Reserves of the Gloucestershire Trust for Nature Conservation/Gloucestershire Wildlife Trust'
- ‘Nature Reserve Guide – discover the wild Gloucestershire on your doorstep’ - 50th Anniversary, January 2011, Gloucestershire Wildlife Trust
- 'Where to see Wildlife in the Forest of Dean', January 2012, Gloucestershire Wildlife Trust

== Wigpool Common ==
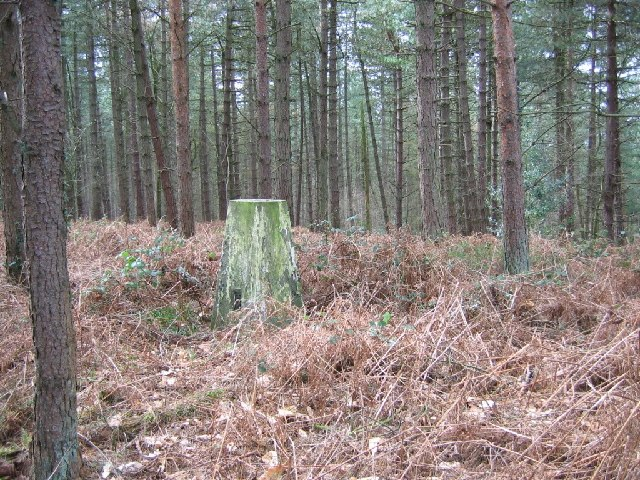
Plantations Wigpool Common

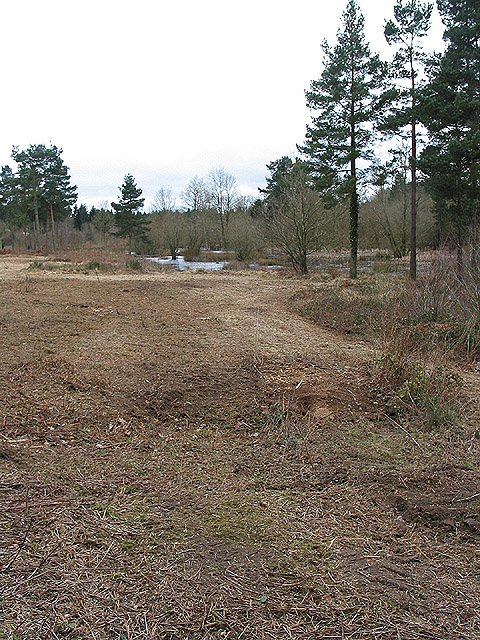
Tree clearance Wigpool Common

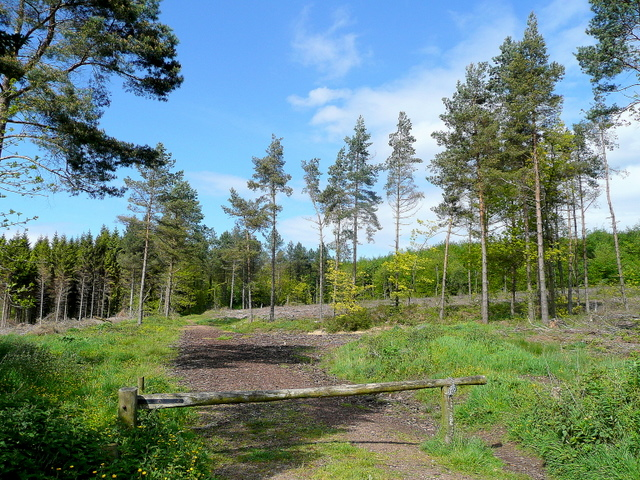
Roadways and felling Wigpool Common

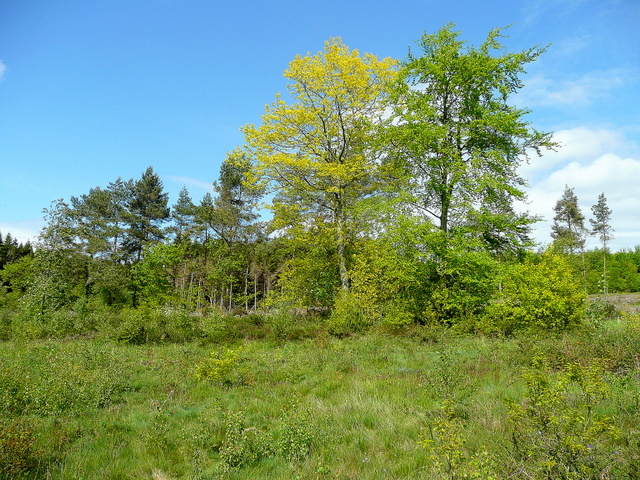
Scrub, conifers and deciduous trees Wigpool Common

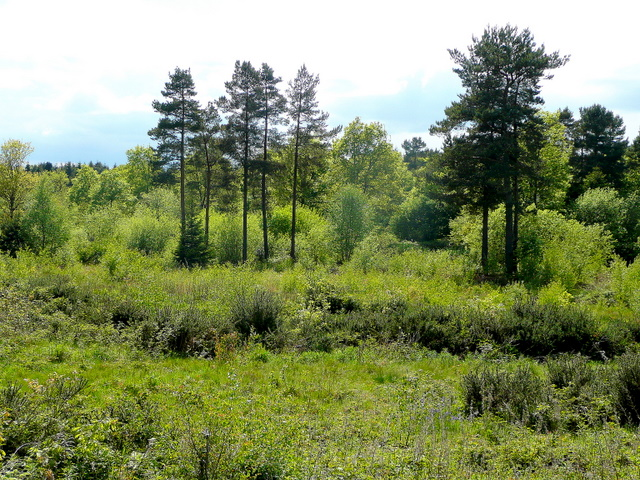
Scrub, conifers and deciduous trees Wigpool Common

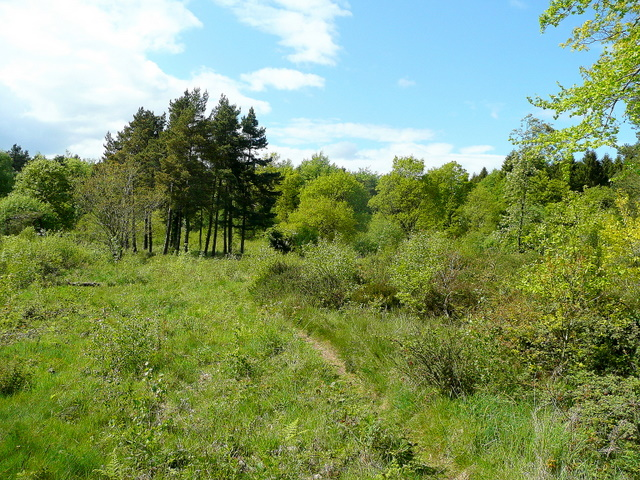
Scrub, conifers and deciduous trees Wigpool Common
