= Salmonsbury Meadows SSSI =

English Site of Special Scientific Interest

Salmonsbury Meadows
- Site of Special Scientific Interest
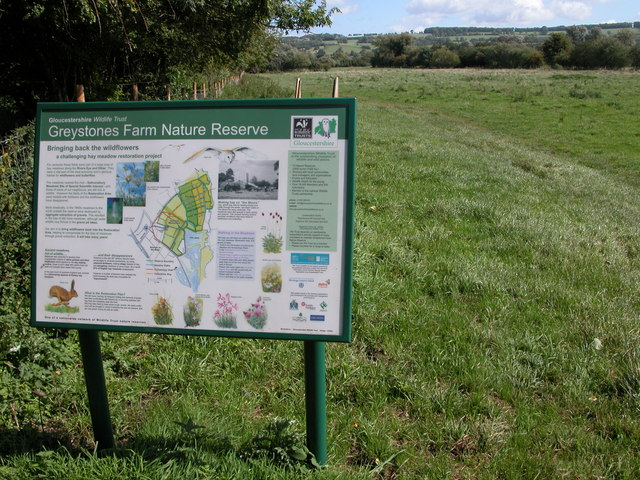
- Salmonsbury Meadows (part of Greystones Farm nature reserve)

- Location within Gloucestershire
- Location of Salmonsbury Meadows.
- Area of search: Gloucestershire
- Grid reference: SP178213
- Coordinates: 51.890422°N 1.742034°W
- Interest: Biological/Geological
- Area: 18 ha (44 acres)
- Notification date: 1985

Salmonsbury Meadows (grid reference SP178213) is an 18-hectare (44-acre) biological and geological Site of Special Scientific Interest in Gloucestershire, notified in 1985. The site is listed in the 'Cotswold District' Local Plan 2001-2011 (on line) as a Key Wildlife Site (KWS).

The site is owned and managed by the Gloucestershire Wildlife Trust, and is part of its Greystones Farm nature reserve (grid reference SP173209). The reserves lie to the east of Bourton-on-the-Water, which is in the Cotswolds. The site, which includes the Site of Special Scientific Interest (SSSI), was bought in three phases over four years. Salmonsbury Meadows were purchased first in 1999. This was followed in 2000 by the Restoration area, which is a 15.9-hectare (39-acre) area of improved grassland adjacent to the SSSI. The third part acquired in 2002 secured the whole farm. This final acquisition included Salmonsbury Camp (ramparts are visible), which is a Scheduled Ancient Monument. The nature reserve is a 66-hectare (160-acre) site. The River Eye runs through the meadows and the River Dikler forms the eastern boundary. There is a network of public footpaths and the long-distance Oxfordshire Way crosses the farm.

There is fuller history of Greystones Farm, its meadows and Salmonsbury Camp in a publication produced by the Gloucestershire Wildlife Trust. Further information may be found on the Dobunni, a Celtic tribe which inhabited this area (Iron Age period).

== Hay meadows ==
There are eleven meadows which are on alluvium and Lower Lias clays near the confluence of the Rivers Eye and Dikler. The citation states they are one of the richest and largest traditional meadow systems remaining in the Cotswolds. The meadows are divided by well developed ancient hedges and there are occasional hedgerow trees. The meadows which make up the SSSI support a wide range of species. These include southern marsh orchid and early marsh orchid. They support great burnet, cuckoo flower, quaking grass, ragged robin, pepper saxifrage and meadow rue. Wetland species grow alongside the River Eye. These include yellow iris, marsh marigold and meadowsweet.

Eurasian otters are recorded to be on adjacent rivers. The River Eye supports one of the county's remaining populations of water vole.

The lakes to the south of the SSSI are in private ownership and support water wildlife.

== Restoration area and other farmland ==
The restoration area, which is adjacent to the SSSI, is undergoing a programme of management to improve the diversity of the flora. The remainder of the farm is mainly improved grassland, but there are dense headerows which provide good habitat for a wide range of species.

== Conservation ==
The SSSI is managed by haymaking which is followed by grazing by cattle. Hay cut from the SSSI is spread in the restoration area to support the introduction of additional wildflowers. The Ancient Monument is protected by low intensity grazing.

== Publications ==
- Kelham, A, Sanderson, J, Doe, J, Edgeley-Smith, M, et al., 1979, 1990, 2002 editions, 'Nature Reserves of the Gloucestershire Trust for Nature Conservation/Gloucestershire Wildlife Trust'
- 'Greystones Farm Nature Reserve – A 6000-year heritage of farming and wildlife', (undated), Gloucestershire Wildlife Trust
