= Laymoor Quag =

Nature reserve in Gloucestershire, England

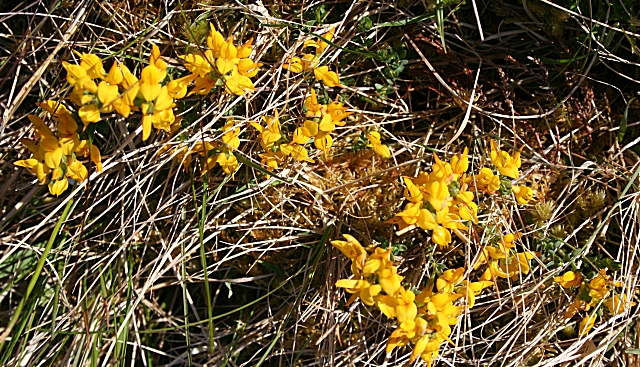
- Example - Petty Whin (Genista anglica)

- Location within Gloucestershire
- Type: Gloucestershire Wildlife Trust nature reserve
- Location: Forest of Dean, near Bilson Green, Cinderford
- Coordinates: 51°49′45.58″N 2°31′2.18″W
- Area: 8.75 acres (3.54 ha)
- Created: 1982
- Operator: Gloucestershire Wildlife Trust Forestry Commission
- Status: Open all year

Laymoor Quag (grid reference SO644146) is a 3.5-hectare (8.6-acre) nature reserve within the Forest of Dean in Gloucestershire. The site is listed in the 'Forest of Dean Local Plan Review' as a Key Wildlife Site (KWS).

The site is owned by the Forestry Commission and managed under agreement by the Gloucestershire Wildlife Trust since 1982.

== Location and history ==
The nature reserve is a site of wet heath and marsh about half a mile north-west of Bilson Green, Cinderford. It is accessed from the south by the Forest Vale Road or from the north via the Forest Vale Industrial Estate. The reserve is surrounded by embankments of the old mineral railway lines, which ran from the coal fields to Drybrook Road Station; it lies on the west side of a disused line that is now a forest ride. It is located on the Dean Coal Measures and was originally part of a thriving mining area. An embankment divides the reserve into two parts.

The reserve is the last remaining relic of the wet heathland of the area. This once was extensive, but was lost to coal-mining and forestry activity in the 18th and 19th centuries.

== Habitat ==
The wet heathland is situated within the wider pondscape, and provides a refuge for the Great Crested Newt, an important protected species. There are scrapes and shallow ponds which help to retain the wetness of the habitat, and these support the propagation of new plants and the populations of dragonflies. The variety of the habitat from sunny embankments to darker areas supports butterflies and fungi.

== Flora and fauna ==
The area to the north of the central embankment is heathland which supports Purple Moor-grass and Mat-grass. Petty Whin grows in abundance on this site and is the only recorded occurrence in the county. Heather and European Gorse are also present. A range of typical heathland flowers flourish, including Heath Bedstraw, Lousewort, Tormentil and Sneezewort.

Trees such as Silver Birch and Alder grow on the embankment. The main hardwood trees on this site were felled a long time ago, but there are numerous dead stumps in the marshland.

The area to the south of the central embankment is marshland, damp and water-logged. Rushes are abundant, and plants include Marsh-marigold, Cuckooflower, Meadow-sweet, Ragged-robin, Lesser Spearwort and Common Marsh-bedstraw.

The pond and spring at the eastern edge provide a swampy habitat which supports Yellow Iris, Skullcap and various bog mosses. A second pond dug in 1984 by the Forestry Commission is now well colonised, and supports a reported good population of dragonflies.

== Conservation ==
The reserve has been grazed by Forest Sheep for a considerable period and action is taken to control invasive plants such as Bracken. Measures have been taken to protect the Petty Whin by fencing.

== Walks ==
There are two publications which detail walks, and places to visit, for recreation, and for observing particular wildlife in this part of the Forest of Dean. These are Where to see Wildlife in the Forest of Dean and Heart of the Forest Wildlife Walk.

== Publications ==
- Kelham, A, Sanderson, J, Doe, J, Edgeley-Smith, M, et al., 1979, 1990, 2002 editions, 'Nature Reserves of the Gloucestershire Trust for Nature Conservation/Gloucestershire Wildlife Trust'
- ‘Nature Reserve Guide – discover the wild Gloucestershire on your doorstep’ - 50th Anniversary, January 2011, Gloucestershire Wildlife Trust
- 'Where to see Wildlife in the Forest of Dean', January 2012, Gloucestershire Wildlife Trust
- 'Heart of the Forest Wildlife Walk', March 2012, Gloucestershire Wildlife Trust
