= Nind Nature Reserve =

Nature reserve in Gloucestershire, England

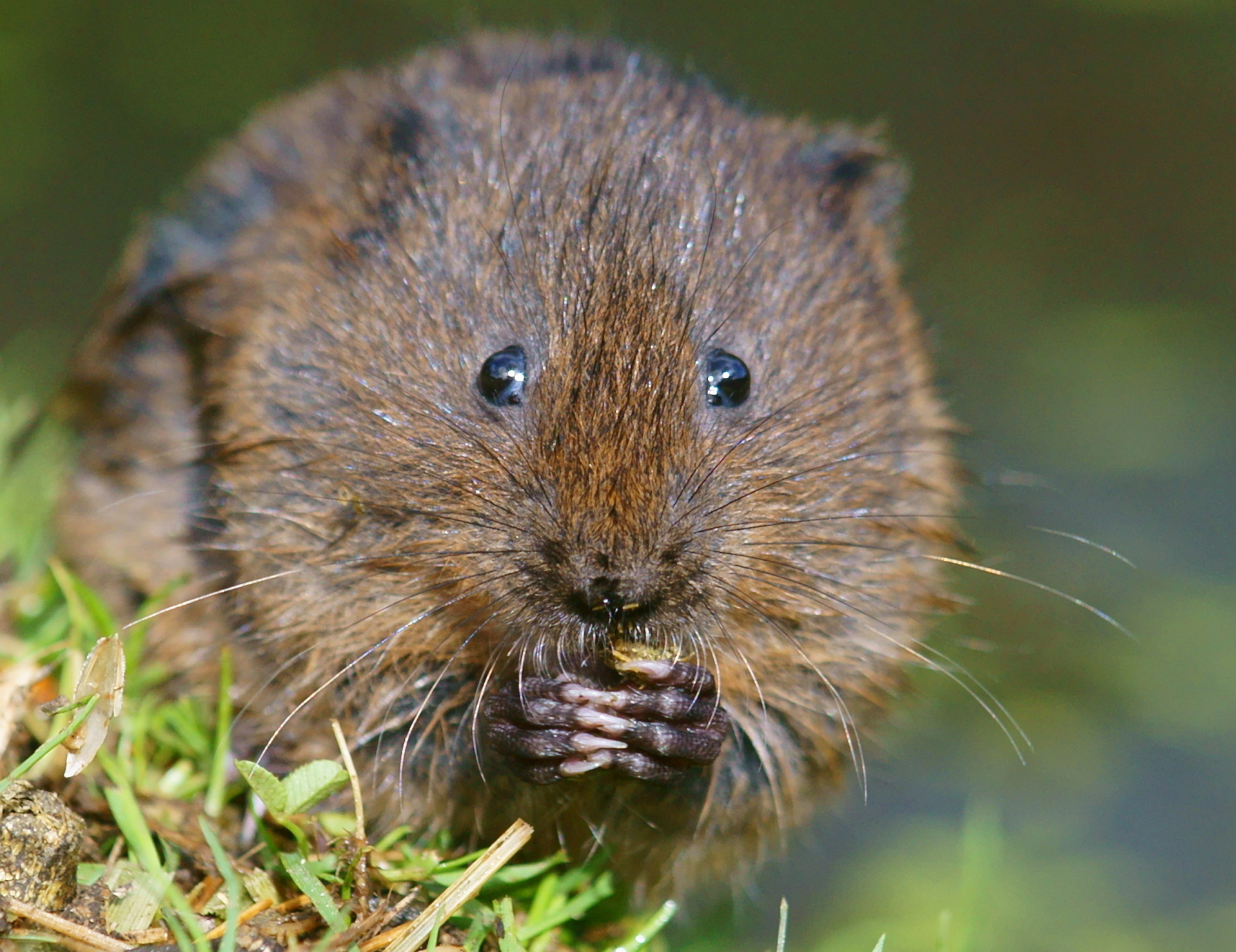
- Water vole (Arvicola terrestris)

- Location within Gloucestershire
- Type: Gloucestershire Wildlife Trust nature reserve
- Location: Nind, near Kingswood, alongside the Ozleworth Brook
- Coordinates: 51°37′20.04″N 2°21′16.46″W
- Area: 9.3 acres (3.8 ha)
- Created: 2010
- Operator: Gloucestershire Wildlife Trust and landowners
- Status: Open all year

Nind Nature Reserve (grid reference ST755915) is a 3.75-hectare (9.3-acre) nature reserve in Gloucestershire.

The site is managed by the Gloucestershire Wildlife Trust and is leased from the landowners. It is a former trout farm.

The site and adjacent areas are designated as a Key Wildlife Site (KWS). These are the Nind Trout farm (2.7-hectare (6.7-acre)), an area of adjacent wet woodland (1.2-hectare (3.0-acre)) and a stretch of Ozleworth Brook (grid reference ST749919 to grid reference ST754916). The reserve forms part of the Berkeley Vale Water Vole Recovery Project’s habitat enhancement scheme.

== Location and habitat ==
The nature reserve is at Nind, near Kingswood, Wotton-under-Edge. None of the trout ponds remain; only the back channels currently exist. The site is now managed as a water vole reserve. These creatures are seen and heard in the water channels. It was formally opened in July 2010.

== Legal protection and threats ==
Water voles are fully protected under Section 9 of the Wildlife and Countryside Act 1981 (as amended). This legal protection means that due care must be paid to the presence of water voles.

The Berkeley Vale Project report indicates the main reasons for the decline in water vole populations. These are given as loss of habitat, isolation of populations, predation by an introduced species (American mink), inappropriate river management, draining of wetlands, building development and intensification in agricultural practices. Appendix E of the report summarises the work done on surveying, mink control and habitat restoration and creation schemes.

== Restoration ==
The site was assessed as having unstable water levels. The remaining channels of the old farm were 'leaky'. This resulted in water levels dropping significantly in dry periods. The site was overgrown with alder and there was encroaching scrub. A healthy population of water voles had been identified downstream in the Ozleworth Brook, but the farm area did not provide connectivity. Risks were also identified in respect of predation by mink and colonisation by rats.

Restoration work has included stabilising the water levels by replacing the degraded impoundment structures. Some 80-90% of the alder growth has been cutback. Fencing for livestock has been installed downstream to help to provide connectivity with the nearest water vole population.

Volunteers have assisted in the work to restore this site and there is an ongoing monitoring programme for the full catchment area.

== Other species ==
Bird life recorded for the site include dippers, kingfishers and herons.

== Publications ==
- Field, J, Dixon G (illustrations), Doe J et al. (photography), 2009, 'Managing land for water voles', Gloucestershire Wildlife Trust
- ‘Nature Reserve Guide – discover the wild Gloucestershire on your doorstep’ - 50th Anniversary, January 2011, Gloucestershire Wildlife Trust

== Water voles, their habitat, national projects ==
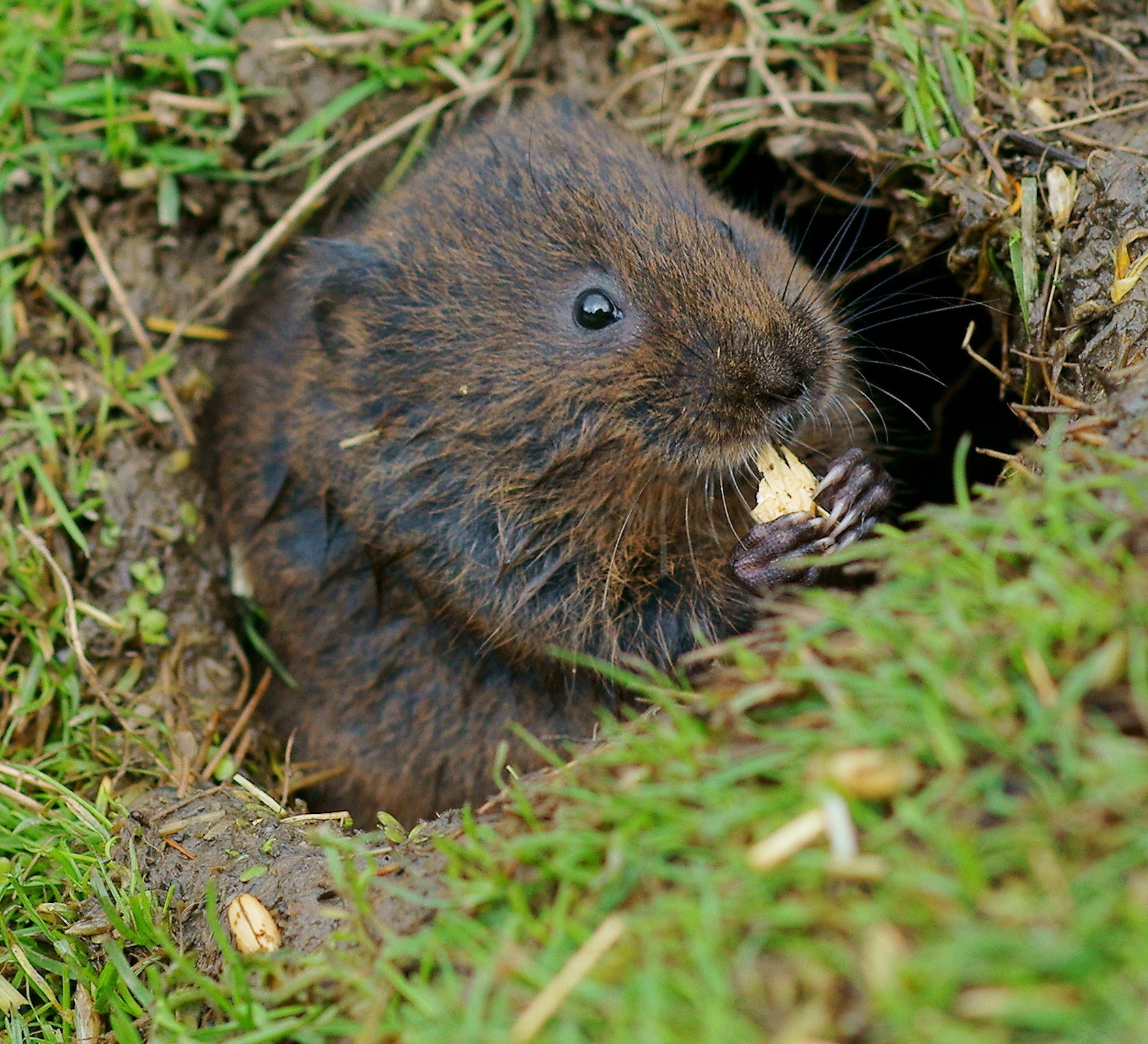
Water vole eating

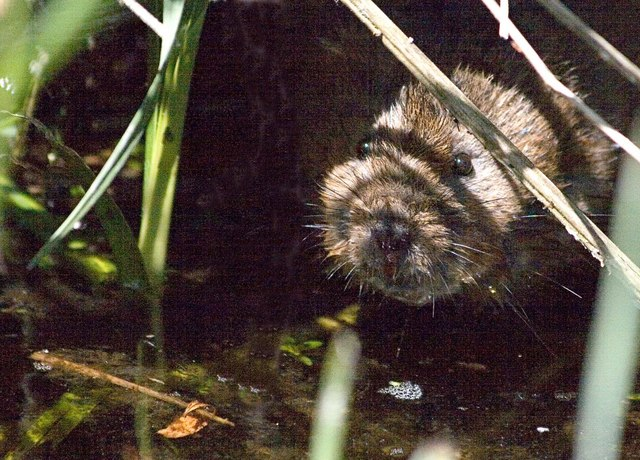
Water vole emerging from burrow

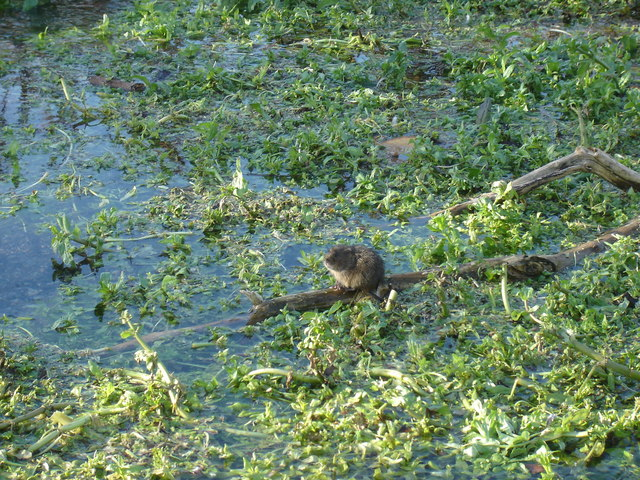
Water vole sitting on a branch in the water

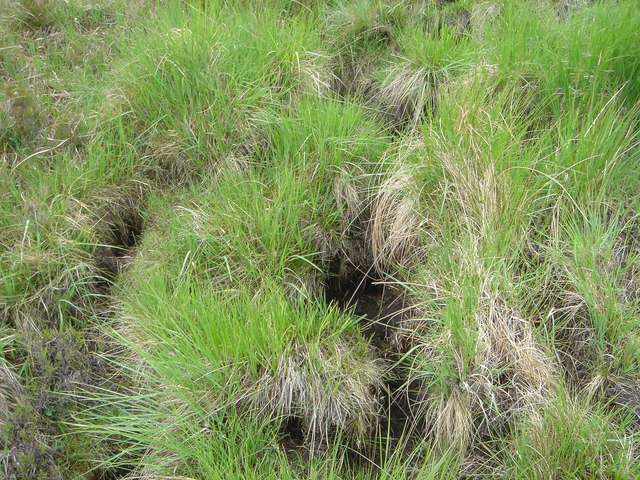
Water vole burrows

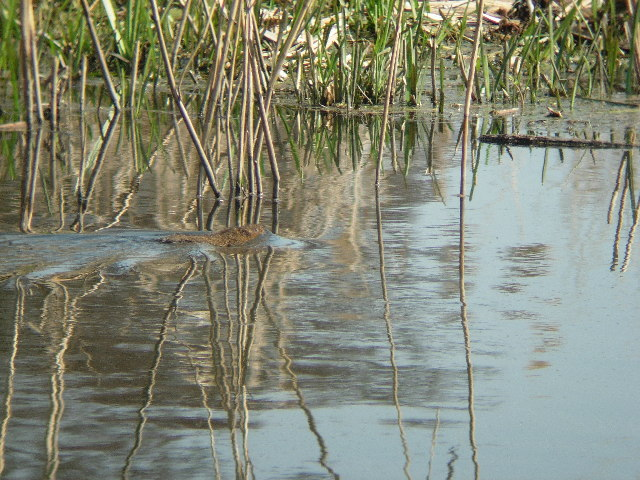
Water vole swimming

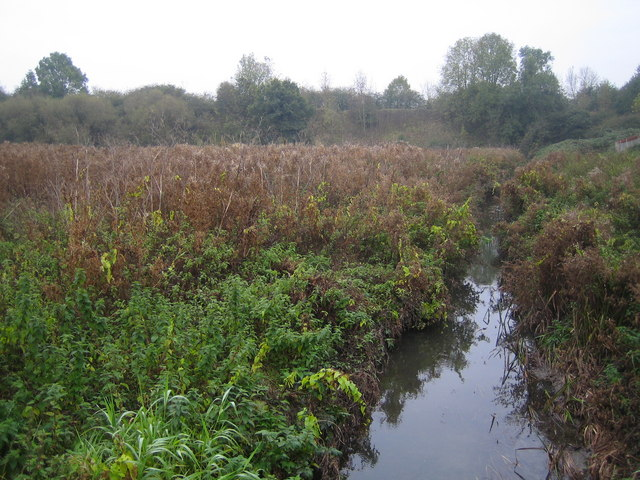
Water vole habitat, Wiltshire Wildlife Trust Nature Reserve

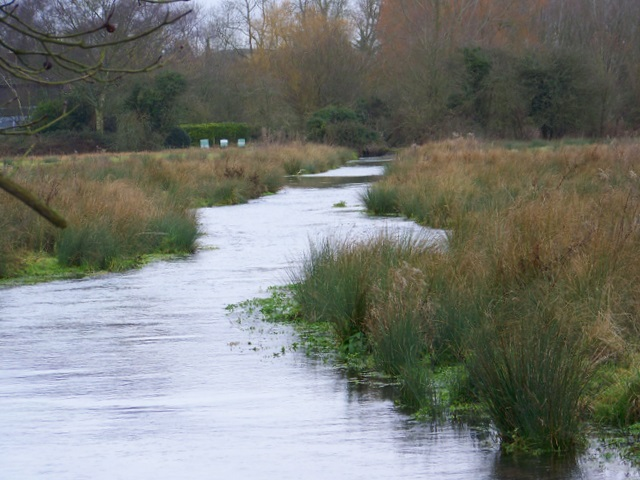
Typical habitat for water voles

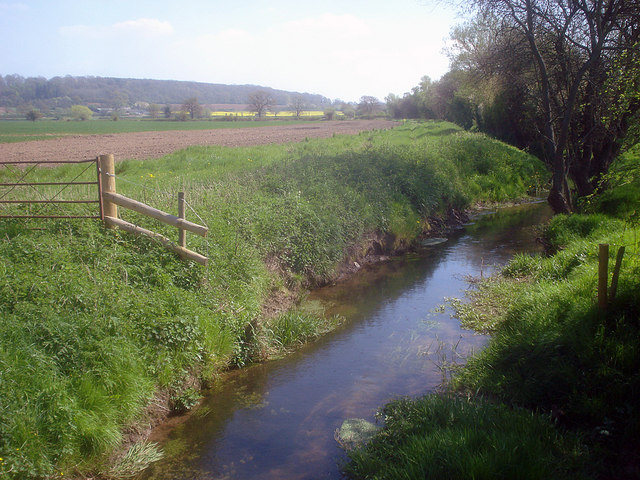
Typical habitat for water voles

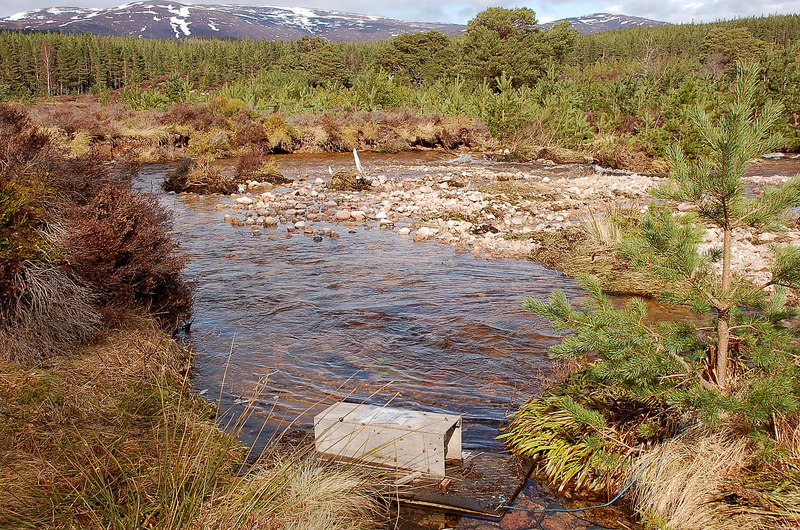
Project work for water vole protection

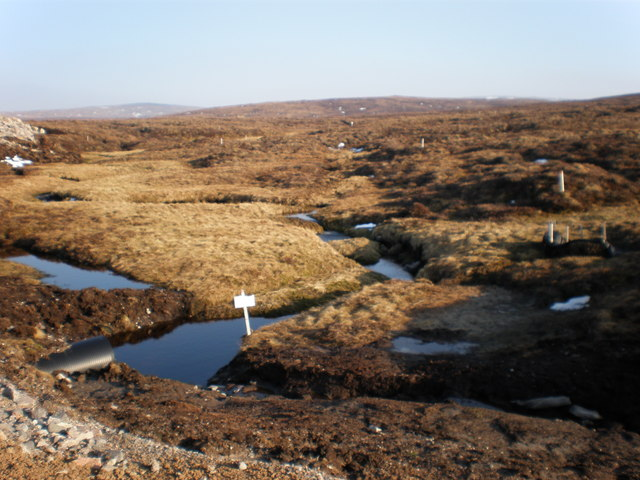
Water vole colony site
