= Brassey SSSI =

Biological Site of Special Scientific Interest in Gloucestershire, England

Brassey
- Site of Special Scientific Interest
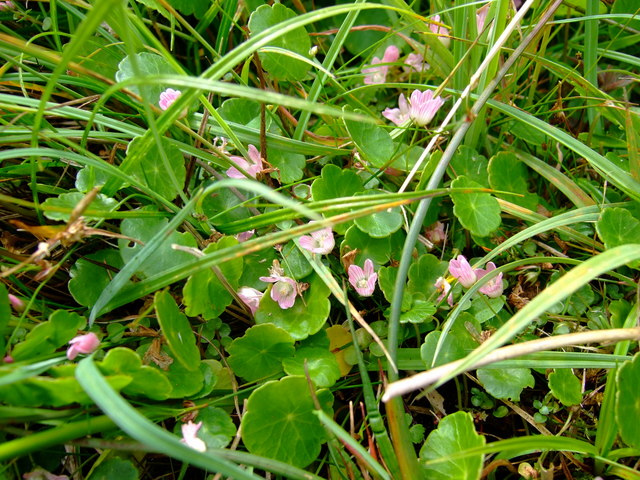
- Example - Bog pimpernel
- Location of Brassey.
- Area of search: Gloucestershire
- Grid reference: SP139223
- Coordinates: 51.89952°N 1.79866°W
- Interest: Biological
- Area: 2.1 ha (5.2 acres)
- Notification date: 1954

Brassey (grid reference SP139223) is a 2.1-hectare (5.2-acre) biological Site of Special Scientific Interest in Gloucestershire, notified in 1954 and renotified in 1983. It is situated on the north side of the Windrush Valley, midway between Naunton and Upper Slaughter. The reserve comprises sloping, unimproved limestone pasture. There is a fast-flowing stream. This site is one of the few freshwater marshes in Gloucestershire. The stream joins the River Windrush.

The site is in the Cotswolds Area of Outstanding Natural Beauty. The site is listed in the 'Cotswold District' Local Plan 2001–2011 (on line) as a Key Wildlife Site (KWS).

The site is named after a previous owner, and was formerly farmland and water-cress beds. A waterwheel and wheelhouse pumped water to a reservoir on the hill above.

The site has been managed by the Gloucestershire Wildlife Trust since 1964 and is part of a larger SSSI named Brassey Reserve and the Windrush Valley which is a 14.48-hectare (35.8-acre) site. In 1974 the Thames Water Authority assumed control of Seven Springs Marsh Pumping Station, which was constructed in the early 1950s and the rest of the site. The SSSI has eight units and the Brassey nature reserve is unit 1 and unit 7.

== Plants and trees ==
Fuller information may be found in the Gloucestershire Wildlife Trust nature reserves handbook and the Brassey Nature reserve descriptive handbook.

=== The marsh ===
The wetland contains a collection of marshland plants. County rarities such as bog pimpernel are recorded, together with marsh lousewort, common cotton-grass, skull-cap, ragged-robin and southern marsh-orchid. Many sedges may be found. These include the only recorded Gloucestershire population of dioecious sedge. A particular feature of the marsh is tussock-sedge, with about forty different flowering plants living as epiphytes on the 2–3 ft high tussocks.

The marsh is fringed with ash, buckthorn and various willows.

=== The pasture ===
The sloping pasture is a good example of oolitic limestone grassland. Hairy violet, cowslip, kidney vetch, common rock-rose and autumn gentian provides colour in the spring and the summer. Uncommon chalk milkwort and purple milk-vetch are also present. One of the reserve's rarest plants, the semi-parasitic bastard toadflax can be seen normally in July.

== Other species ==
Fuller information may be found in the Gloucestershire Wildlife Trust nature reserves handbook and the Brassey Nature reserve descriptive handbook.

The yellow meadow ant creates numerous anthills, which is an indicator of the ancient nature of the grassland. Glow-worms are amongst a diverse invertebrate fauna, which also includes the purse-web spider. Lizards can be seen in hot weather.

Butterflies includes Duke of Burgundy and small blue. Downland and wetland birds include dipper, kingfisher, yellowhammer and tree pipit. Reed buntings breed in the marsh.

== Conservation ==
The open short grassland sward is maintain by periodic sheep grazing and scrub removal. Invasive plants are removed from the wetland. These are, in particular, monkey-flower, purple moor-grass and blunt-flowered rush.

== Publications ==
1977, 'The Brassey Nature Reserve - Descriptive Handbook', Gloucestershire Trust for Nature Conservation

- Kelham, A, Sanderson, J, Doe, J, Edgeley-Smith, M, et al., 1979, 1990, 2002 editions, 'Nature Reserves of the Gloucestershire Trust for Nature Conservation/Gloucestershire Wildlife Trust'

== SSSI Source ==
- Natural England SSSI information on the citation
- Natural England SSSI information on the Brassey and Windrush Valley units
