= Gloucestershire Wildlife Trust =

Organization

Coordinates: 51°50′01″N 2°13′57″W

- Formation: 1961
- Type: Membership organisation governed by its Memorandum and Articles of Association, a Registered Charity and a company limited by guarantee
- Headquarters: Robinswood Hill Country Park, Reservoir Road, Gloucester GL4 6SX
- Members: 26,500+ (UK)
- Chief Executive: Andrew McLaughlin, formerly Roger Mortlock
- Key people: President: Dame Fiona Reynolds, Chairman: David Bullock,
- Staff: over 40 and over 500 active volunteers
- Website: gloucestershirewildlifetrust.co.uk

Robinswood Hill Country Park, Gloucestershire (Gloucestershire Wildlife Trust Headquarters location)

The Gloucestershire Wildlife Trust is the Gloucestershire local partner in a conservation network of 46 Wildlife Trusts. The Wildlife Trusts are local charities with the specific aim of protecting the United Kingdom's natural heritage. The Gloucestershire Wildlife Trust is managed by a board of trustees elected from its membership who provide overall direction for the development of the trust and there are advisory committees. The work of the trust is carried out through staff and volunteers.

== History ==
The trust was founded in 1961 and was then named the Gloucestershire Trust for Nature Conservation. Founder members included Sir Peter Scott, Christopher Cadbury and a group of other local people with the shared interest of nature conservation. The name was changed to the Gloucestershire Wildlife Trust in 1991. In 1990, Lady Scott became the trust's patron succeeding her late husband, Sir Peter Scott. Originally the trust headquarters was at Church House, Standish, which was opened in 1971. By that year 33 nature reserves were under trust management. In 1989, the Prince of Wales was present at the launch of the appeal for funding for the proposed new nature centre, which was held in Shire Hall, Gloucester. In 1992 a new headquarters and Conservation Centre was opened at Robinswood Hill Country Park by Sir David Attenborough. In 1993, Sir Henry Elwes became the president following the late Lord Dulverton. In 1995, the Prince of Wales visited the Midger SSSI reserve, being one of the woodland reserves in the county. In 1997 the Prince of Wales opened the Lower Woods SSSI Nature Reserve. In 1999, Chris Packham launched an event on Cleeve Common hosted by the trust, which involved geological work at Rolling Bank Quarry SSSI. In 2004, a special 10-year award from 'Investors in People' was achieved. In 2008 the Badgeworth SSSI nature reserve, the first reserve managed by the trust, celebrated its 75th anniversary. In 2012 this reserve celebrated its 50th anniversary of being managed by the trust.

In December 2014, Ellie Harrison the host of Countryfile became president of the trust taking over from Sir Henry Elwes. In November 2023, Dame Fiona Reynolds became president of the trust.

== Activities ==
The trust's work includes recording and studying places and objects of natural interest and establishing nature reserves. It undertakes research in the natural sciences, and provides educational material for the public in sustainable development and biodiversity conservation. It operates a schools' programme for over 2,000 children each year. It campaigns for wildlife and protection of threatened habitats and species. It holds events at its headquarters or on its reserves. It is involved in recycling, waste management and promoting sustainable practices. It advises landowners and local authorities.

The trust publishes a regular printed magazine to keep people informed, and maintains a subscription list for a regular electronic newsletter. The printed magazine was 'Highly Commended' in the BBC Wildlife Magazine Awards for the Best UK Environmental Charity Publications in 1997.

== Nature reserves ==
Gloucestershire is varied in scenery due to the geology. It is also a mainly agricultural county and can be divided into four distinct regions being: the Cotswolds; The Severn Vale; Over Severn and the Forest of Dean. The areas include woodlands, grasslands, heathlands, scrub, standing water, marshes, bogs, floodlands, estuaries.

The trust has over 45 reserves throughout Gloucestershire, covering some 700 hectares or more. The trust issued a reserves handbook in 1979, which has been updated at intervals with a supporting publication for 2009/2010 and for 2011 for the 50th Anniversary of the trust. These reserves are either purchased or managed under agreement. The value of these reserves in respect of special and rare species is defined through national standards, and particularly through Natural England, which sets thresholds for 'favourable condition' status. Management Plans must be written for all nature reserves. The trust's reserves are listed below and include Sites of Special Scientific Interest (SSSIs):

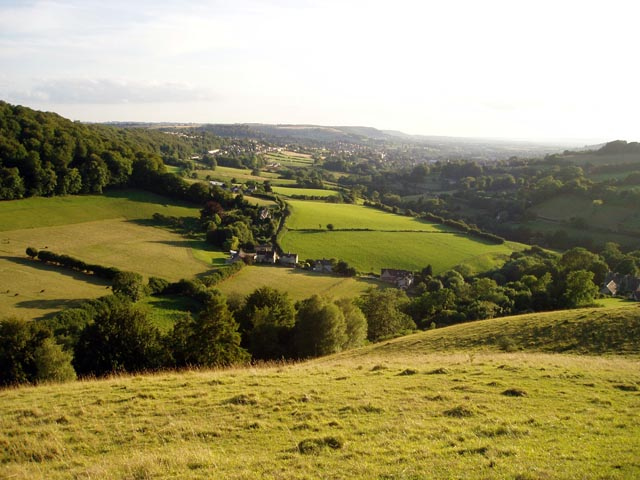
Elliot SSSI (Swift's Hill) nature reserve

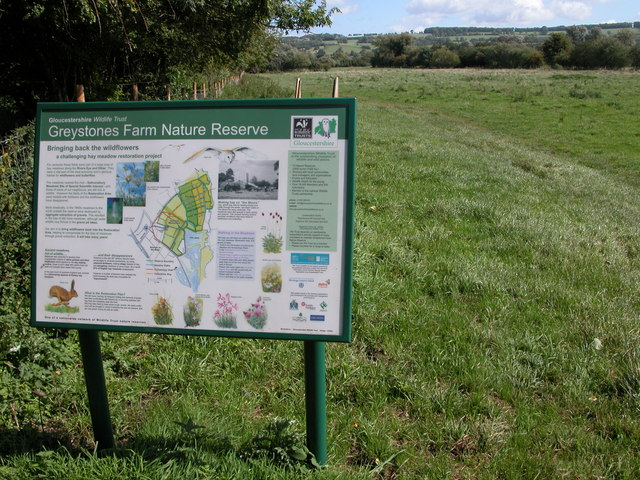
Greystones Farm nature reserve (including Salmonsbury Meadows SSSI)

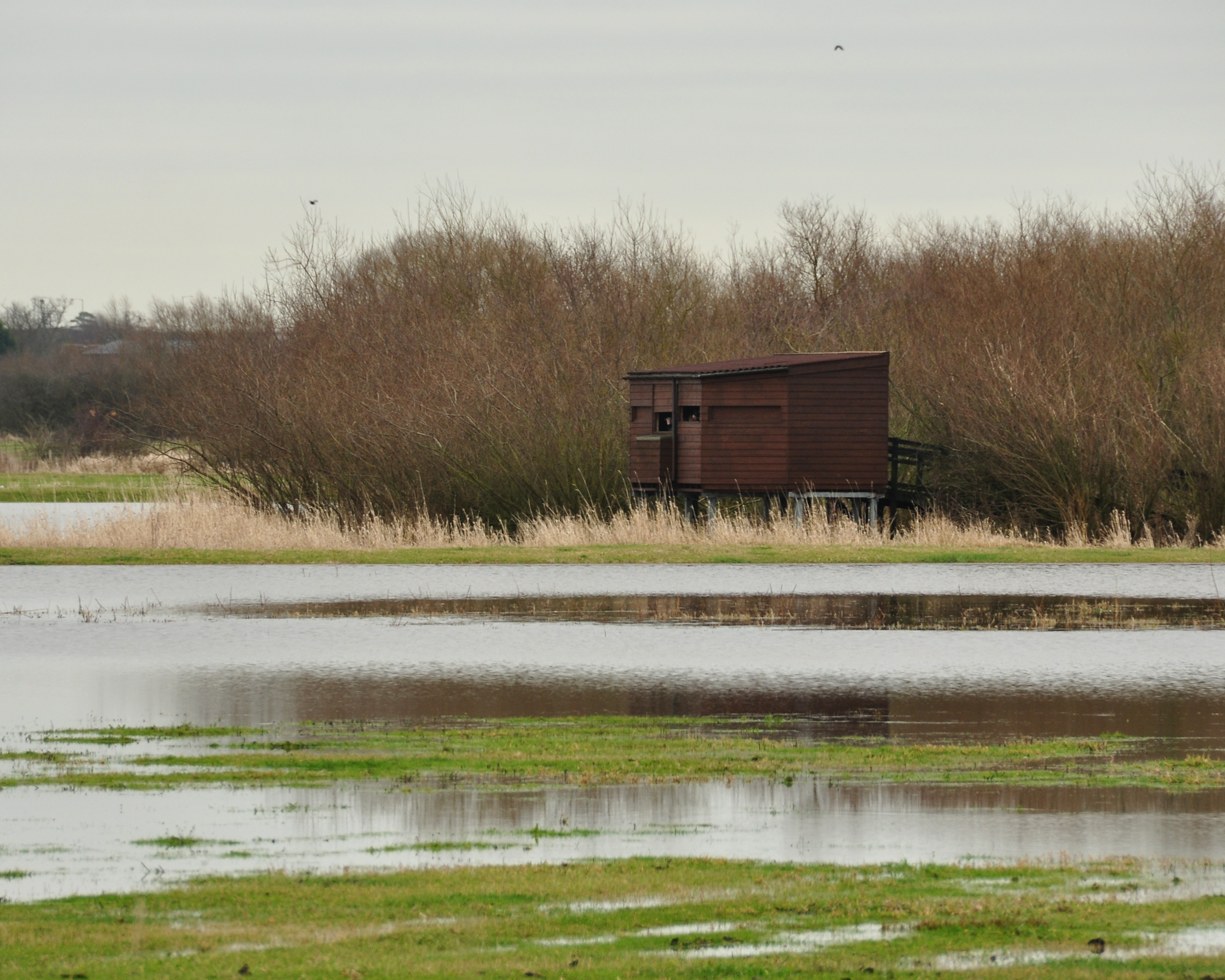
Bird Hide at Coombe Hill nature reserve

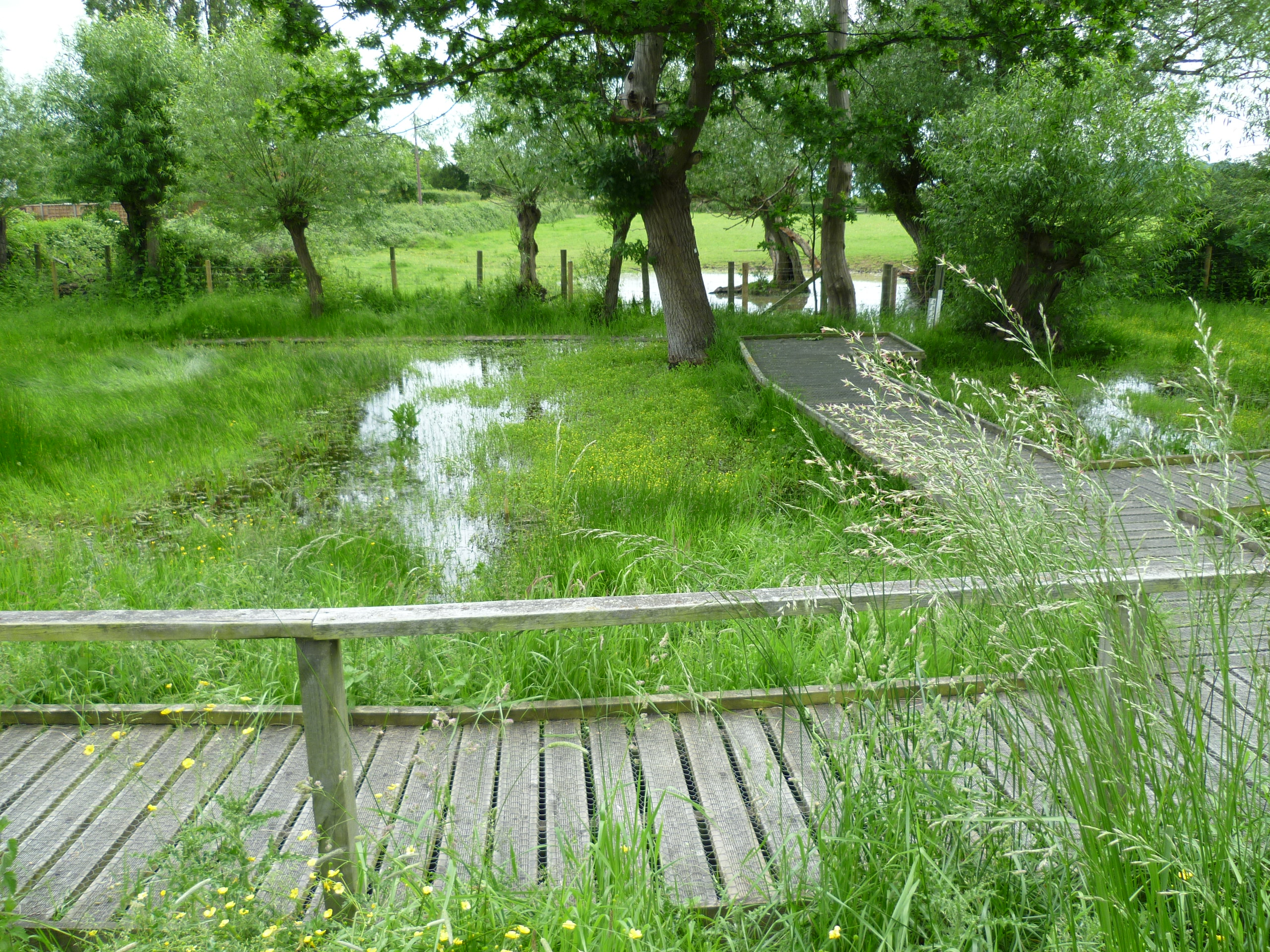
Badgeworth buttercup flowering in reserve

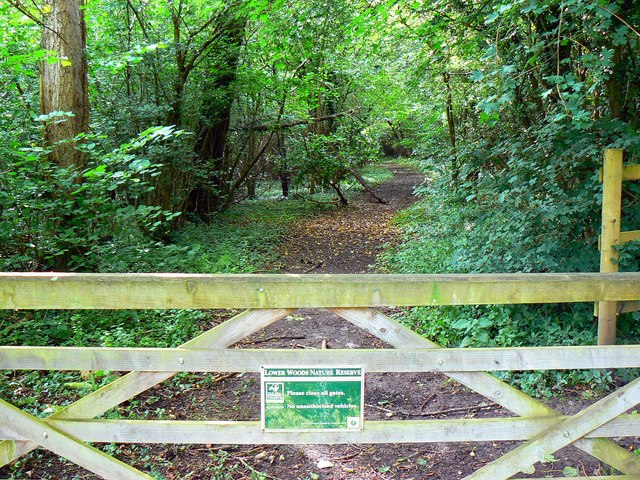
Gateway and path, Lower Woods nature Reserve

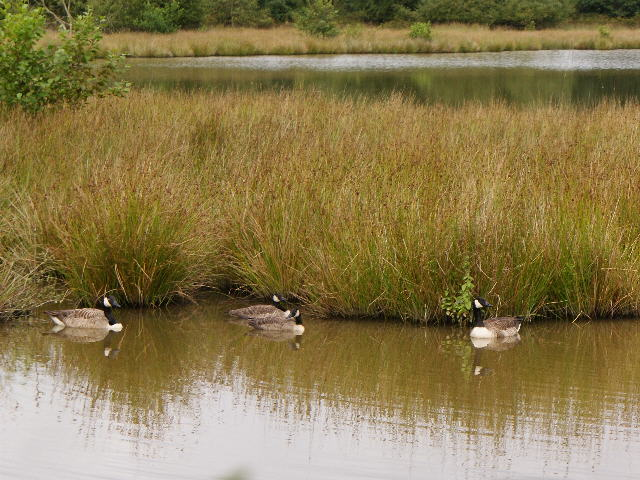
Woorgreen's Lake, Forest of Dean nature reserve

- Arle Grove
- Ashleworth Ham SSSI and Meerend Thicket
- Badgeworth SSSI
- Ban-y-gor Woods SSSI part of the Lower Wye Gorge SSSI
- Betty Daws Wood SSSI part of Dymock Woods SSSI
- Brassey SSSI part of the Brassey Reserve and the Windrush Valley SSSI
- Bryworth Lane part of the Cotswold Water Park group of reserves
- Cannop Bridge Marsh at Cannop Ponds
- Chaceley Meadow SSSI
- Chedworth
- Clarke's Pool Meadows SSSI notified as Clarke's Pool Meadow
- Collin Park Wood SSSI notified as Collinpark Wood
- Coombe Hill Canal SSSI and Meadows
- Cutsdean Quarry
- Daneway Banks SSSI
- East Wood
- Edgehills Bog
- Edward Richardson and Phyllis Amey part of the Cotswold Water Park group of reserves
- Elliott SSSI notified as Swift's Hill
- Frith Wood (Morley Penistan Memorial) SSSI part of Bull Cross, The Frith and Juniper Hill SSSI
- Frome Banks
- Greystones Farm (includes Salmonsbury Meadows SSSI)
- Gwen and Vera's Fields
- Hobbs Quarry SSSI
- Ketford Bank
- Lancaut SSSI part of the Lower Wye Gorge SSSI
- Laurie Lee Wood
- Laymoor Quag
- Lippets Grove (Offa's Dyke Path)
- Lower Woods SSSI
- Midger SSSI
- Mitcheldean Meend Marsh
- Mythe Railway
- Neu Lindsey
- Nind
- Oakenhill
- Old London Road SSSI notified as part of the Wotton Hill SSSI
- Pasqueflower SSSI notified as part of the Barnsley Warren SSSI
- Ridley Bottom
- Robinson's Wood
- Roundhouse Lake SSSI notified as part of the Cotswold Water Park SSSI
- Sapperton Valley
- Siccaridge Wood
- Small Reserve
- Snows Farm
- Stenders Quarry SSSI
- Strawberry Banks SSSI
- Stuart Fawkes SSSI notified as Box Farm Meadows
- The Park & Poor's Allotment
- The Park Campus, University of Gloucestershire (Community Green Space)
- Three Groves Wood
- Vell Mill Daffodil Meadow
- Whelford Pools SSSI notified as part of the Cotswold Water Park SSSI
- Wigpool
- Woorgreens Lake and Marsh

== Gloucestershire Centre for Environmental records ==
Gloucestershire Centre for Environmental Records (GCER) is the county's Local Record Centre and holds data about the county's wildlife. GCER has approximately 1,000,000 species records in its database, many of these are supplied by the county recorders from the Gloucestershire Naturalists' Society. The data are made publicly available. The centre is managed by the trust. In March 2011 the trust and the Gloucestershire Centre for Environmental Records published its 'State of the Natural Environment Report' on behalf of the Gloucestershire Environmental Partnership (authors: Dr C Studholme, Gloucestershire Wildlife Trust; Linda Moore, Gloucestershire Centre for Environmental Records). In 2012 the trust published its report on the 'State of the Environment in Gloucestershire' about brownfield land.

== Gloucestershire Biodiversity Partnership ==
Gloucestershire has a Biodiversity Action Plan ("BAP") controlled by the Gloucestershire Biodiversity Partnership, which sets out conservation priorities in Gloucestershire. The Gloucestershire BAP is the local county interpretation of the United Kingdom Biodiversity Action Plan (1992–2012). The trust is a member of this Partnership together with a wide range of organisations.

The Nature Map for Gloucestershire was launched in March 2008 by the Gloucestershire Biodiversity Partnership. The Gloucestershire Nature Map is part of a larger map covering the whole of the south west region. It locates the major habitats in the county, identifies the 'hotspots' where they still exist, and thus where they can best be created, enhanced, or restored to establish larger and more viable areas to sustain wildlife for the future. These target areas are called Strategic Nature Areas (SNAs) and the aim is to restore up to 60% of each SNA to good quality wildlife habitat.

== Key Wildlife Sites network ==
A Wildlife Sites network currently includes over some 800 sites in the county, which are considered the best places for wildlife to develop. These sites are in addition to Trust nature reserves. This list is maintained by the trust.

== Living Landscapes ==
A Living Landscape is a recovery plan for nature. This work has been in the national The Wildlife Trusts programme since 2006.

The Gloucestershire Trust part of the programme has been the initiation of the Living Landscape project in the Severn Vale (2007), the Cotswolds Rivers project (2009) and a project centred on the Forest of Dean (2011).

== Former Nature Reserves and reserves managed under agreement ==
- Dowdeswell Reservoir and Wood
- Five Acre Grove
- Foxes Bridge Bog

== Campaigns ==
Water voles – A nationally threatened species once common on rivers and streams. In Gloucestershire water voles have disappeared from the river systems and a few fragmented populations survive. The trust provides information to identify a water vole and the land management necessary to support habitat. The water vole is on the list for action in the UK Biodiversity Action Plan. The trust carried out a survey in 1978/79 on rivers and streams in the county. A further survey was started in March 1997 in conjunction with the Wildfowl and Wetlands Trust. The trust published the results of the 1997/98 survey in 2001. This is reported in the Biodiversity Action Plan for Gloucestershire.

== Publications ==
- Guy, C, Haigh, D, Harris, Lucy, Harris, Lyn, Parker, J, Ralphs, I, Tandy, C, (1977 edition edited Holland, S) et al., 1966, 1967, 1977, 2007 editions, 'Badgeworth Nature Reserve Handbook' Gloucestershire Trust for Nature Conservation, Gloucestershire Wildlife Trust
- 1977, 'The Brassey Nature Reserve – Descriptive Handbook', Gloucestershire Trust for Nature Conservation
- Kelham, A, Sanderson, J, Doe, J, Edgeley-Smith, M, et al., 1979, 1990, 2002 editions, 'Nature Reserves of the Gloucestershire Trust for Nature Conservation/Gloucestershire Wildlife Trust'
- Bathe, G M, Bell, T, Nicholls, S P, Nicholls, M, Raffe, R W, et al. (editors McGlone, Dr. G, Sparrow, Brig. C E H, Worsnip, H), April 1981, 'Wildlife in Gloucestershire – A Habitat Survey', Gloucestershire Trust for Nature Conservation
- 1981, revised 1985, 'Mythe Railway Nature Reserve', Gloucestershire Trust for Nature Conservation
- Penistan, M J, Cuthbert, C R, (directors and project supervisors), McGlone, G, Penistan, M J, Sparrow, G E H, Worsnip, J V, (editorial panel), 1984, 'The Rivers and Streams of Gloucestershire: a survey report’, Gloucestershire Trust for Nature Conservation
- Goudge, C, Hawkins, W, Regini, K A, 1987, Bullard, P (editor), ‘A Revised Inventory of Gloucestershire's Ancient Woodlands: The Cotswold Plateau’, Gloucestershire Trust for Nature Conservation
- (undated), mid-late 1980s, 'Midger Reserve Kilcot', Gloucestershire Trust for Nature Conservation
- (undated), 'Snow's Farm Reserve Handbook', Gloucestershire Trust for Nature Conservation
- 1986, 'Chedworth Nature Reserve: Booklet 1, Introduction', Gloucestershire Trust for Nature Conservation
- Atty, D, Haigh, D J R, Holland, Sonia, Long, D C, Porter, Steve (edited Miller, John, illustrated Ball, Arthur), October 1987, 'Plants and Animals of the Dowdeswell Reservoir Nature Reserve', Gloucestershire Trust for Nature Conservation
- Ball, Arthur, Barber, Bruce, undated, 'The Birds of Dowdeswell Reservoir Nature Reserve', The Gloucestershire Trust for Nature Conservation
- Bullard, P, McGlone, G, Regini, K A, 1988, (editors) ‘A Revised Inventory of Gloucestershire's Ancient Woodlands: the Stroud and Dursley Valleys’, Gloucestershire Trust for Nature Conservation
- 1988, 'Nature for Children, Making the Most of School Nature Areas', Gloucestershire Trust for Nature Conservation
- Doe, J, Parrott, S, (edited McGlone, Dr. G, Regini, K), October 1989, ‘Gloucestershire Commons – Their History, Wildlife and Future’, Gloucestershire Trust for Nature Conservation
- 1991, 'Plants and Animals of the Edward Richardson and Phyllis Amey Nature Reserve', Gloucestershire Trust for Nature Conservation
- 'Gloucestershire Centre for Environmental Records (Established in 1991 as Gloucestershire Environmental Data Unit)', (undated), Cheltenham Borough Council, Cotswold District Council, English Nature now Natural England, Forest of Dean District Council, Gloucestershire County Council, Gloucestershire Naturalists' Society, Gloucestershire Wildlife Trust, Stroud District Council, Tewkesbury Borough Council (joint publication of The Partnership)
- Bell, D V, 1992, 'Cotswold Water Park – Nature Conservation Review', Gloucestershire Wildlife Trust
- 1995, "A Wildlife Guide – Siccaridge Wood and Sapperton Valley Nature Reserve', Gloucestershire Wildlife Trust
- Martin M (editor), 1996, 2004 (revised second edition), 'Lower Woods Nature Reserve – A Guide', Gloucestershire Wildlife Trust
- 2001(published),'Gloucestershire Water Vole Survey (1997/98)', Gloucestershire Wildlife Trust
- Martin M, Rowlatt, S (editors), 2001(published), 'The Natural History of Lower Woods in 2000 AD', Gloucestershire Wildlife Trust, (includes list of contributors)
- 'The Severn Vale Living Landscape', (undated), Gloucestershire Wildlife Trust
- Field, J, Dixon G (illustrations), Doe J et al. (photography), 2009, 'Managing land for water voles', Gloucestershire Wildlife Trust
- 'Chedworth Nature Reserve – Scenic railway to woodland refuge and geology trail', (undated) Gloucestershire Wildlife Trust
- 'Collin Park Wood Nature Reserve – Dick Whittington's ancient lime and oak wood', (undated) Gloucestershire Wildlife Trust
- 'Coombe Hill Nature Reserve – Restoration of a major Severn wetland (Information and Circular Walk)', (undated), Gloucestershire Wildlife Trust
- 'Nature Reserves in the Cotswold Water Park', (undated), Gloucestershire Wildlife Trust
- 'Elliott Nature Reserve at Swifts Hill – One of the county's finest wildflower grasslands', (undated), Gloucestershire Wildlife Trust
- 'Frith Wood – Morley Penistan Nature Reserve – A magnificent ancient beechwood', (undated), Gloucestershire Wildlife Trust
- 'Greystones Farm Nature Reserve – A 6000-year heritage of farming and wildlife', (undated), Gloucestershire Wildlife Trust
- 'Hobbs Quarry Nature Reserve – Beautiful woodland walk among Silurian coral reefs', (undated), Gloucestershire Wildlife Trust
- 'Lancaut and Ban-y-Gor Nature Reserves – Information and the Lancaut Walk', (undated), Gloucestershire Wildlife Trust
- 'Lower Woods Nature Reserve – Information and Waymarked Walks', (undated), Gloucestershire Wildlife Trust
- 'Midger Nature Reserve – Wonderful ancient woodland in a hidden valley', (undated), Gloucestershire Wildlife Trust
- 'Old London Road Nature Reserve near Wotton-under-Edge', (undated), Gloucestershire Wildlife Trust
- 'Exploring the grounds of The Park – The history and wildlife of this beautiful University of Gloucestershire site', (undated), Gloucestershire Wildlife Trust and University of Gloucestershire joint publication
- 'Siccaridge Wood and Sapperton Valley Nature Reserve – Ancient Dormouse woodland and luxuriant valley wetland', (undated), Gloucestershire Wildlife Trust
- 'Snows Farm Nature Reserve – A secret valley paradise for wildlife and people', (undated), Gloucestershire Wildlife Trust
- 'Whelford Pools Nature Reserve – Superb lake refuge for wetland birds, plants and dragonflies', (undated), Gloucestershire Wildlife Trust
- 'Woorgreens Nature Reserve', (undated), Gloucestershire Wildlife Trust and Forestry Commission joint publication
- 'The Daffodil Trails', (undated), Gloucestershire Wildlife Trust
- 'The Golden Valley Walk', (undated), Gloucestershire Wildlife Trust
- 'Cotswold Rivers for People and Wildlife', (undated), Gloucestershire Wildlife Trust
- 'Key Wildlife Sites in the Forest of Dean', (undated), Gloucestershire Wildlife Trust
- 'Scowles in the Forest of Dean – their formation, history and wildlife', (undated), Gloucestershire Wildlife Trust, Gloucestershire County Council Archaeology Service, Gloucestershire Geoconservation Trust, English Heritage and English Nature (now Natural England) joint publication
- 'Nature Reserve Guide – discover the wild Gloucestershire on your doorstep' – 50th Anniversary, January 2011, Gloucestershire Wildlife Trust
- Moore, L, Studholme, C, 'State of the Natural Environment Report', March 2011, prepared for the Gloucestershire Environment Partnership by Gloucestershire Centre for Environmental Records and Gloucestershire Wildlife Trust
- 'Where to see Wildlife in the Forest of Dean', January 2012, Gloucestershire Wildlife Trust
- 'Heart of the Forest Wildlife Walk', March 2012, Gloucestershire Wildlife Trust
- 'Tidenham Wildlife Walk', March 2012, Gloucestershire Wildlife Trust
- Studholme, C, 'The State of the Natural Environment in Gloucestershire 2012', July 2012, Gloucestershire Wildlife Trust

== See also ==
- List of Sites of Special Scientific Interest in Gloucestershire
