= Edgehills Bog =

Nature reserve in Gloucestershire, England

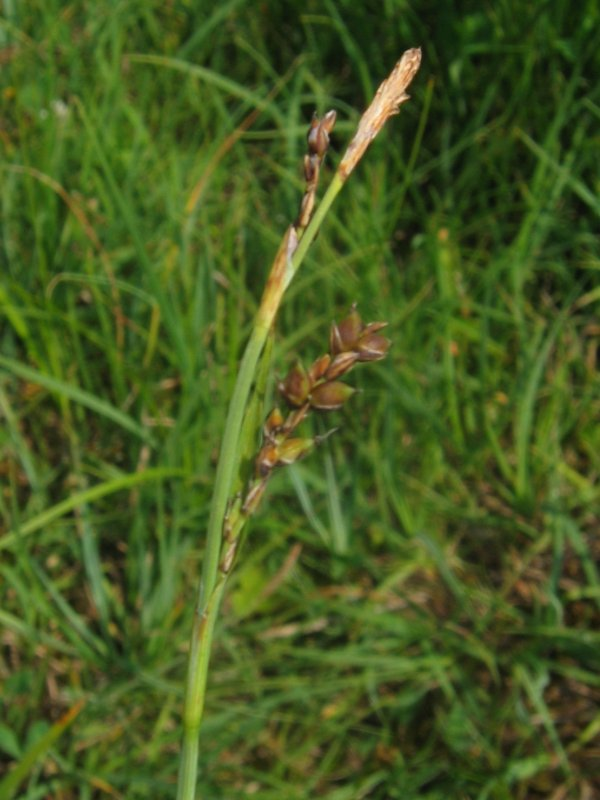
- Example - Carnation Sedge (Carex panica)

- Location within Gloucestershire
- Type: Gloucestershire Wildlife Trust nature reserve
- Location: near Cinderford
- Coordinates: 51°50′11.83″N 2°29′38.88″W
- Area: 1.63 acres (0.66 ha)
- Created: 1987
- Operator: Gloucestershire Wildlife Trust
- Status: Open all year

Edgehills Bog (grid reference SO660154) is a 0.66-hectare (1.6-acre) nature reserve in Gloucestershire in the Forest of Dean.

The site is managed by the Gloucestershire Wildlife Trust and held under agreement with the Forestry Commission since 1987. The site is listed in the Forest of Dean Local Plan Review as a Key Wildlife Site (KWS).

== Location and habitat ==
The bog lies at the eastern edge of Haywood (Heywood) Plantation and half a mile north of Cinderford. This is a remote site with Forestry Commission tracks or rides leading to it. It is some 850 feet (260 m) above sea level and is on Drybrook Sandstone. It is on the crest of the eastern boundary ridge of the Forest of Dean. This nature reserve is a relic of a type of habitat which was once widespread in the area.

A much larger area was enclosed and planted with oak trees in the 1780s. Part of the area was planted with conifers in the 1960s. There was a clearance of conifers in the 1980s which had been fire damaged. A wet heathland community of plants has re-established itself since that time.

There are drainage ditches on the boundaries of the reserve which are managed to maintain correct water levels, and the bog is surrounded by plantations on the north and south sides.

== Flora ==
The reserve is populated in the wetter, boggier areas with Purple Moor-grass, Sphagnum Moss and rushes. Also flourishing are Carnation Sedge, Common Cotton-grass and Marsh Violet. In the drier heathland areas there is Heather, Bilberry, Heath Milkwort, Lousewort, Sheep's-bit and Heath Groundsel. Also recorded are Gorse, Foxglove and Bramble. Also found is Blue eyed Grass (sisyrinchium augustifolium). This species may have been introduced from Ireland in 1959 when the naturalist Bruce Campbell introduced Pitcher Plants and Butterworts as part of a children's programme.

Trees and scrub growing are Silver Birch, Scots Pine and Larch which have encroached from the surrounding woodland and plantations. These are being regularly removed by the volunteer group Dean Green Team.

== Fauna ==
The remoteness and habitat encourage heathland and woodland birds. Recorded are some of the commoner species of dragonfly, notably over the areas of open water.

== Conservation ==
It is necessary to keep scrub encroachment under control. The boggy areas need ditch maintenance, and diversions and scrapes to maintain high water levels. The latter is needed to encourage plant life and insects.

== Walks ==
There is a publication which details places to visit for recreation, and for observing particular wildlife in this part of the Forest of Dean.

== Publications ==
- Kelham, A, Sanderson, J, Doe, J, Edgeley-Smith, M, et al., 1979, 1990, 2002 editions, 'Nature Reserves of the Gloucestershire Trust for Nature Conservation/Gloucestershire Wildlife Trust'
- ‘Nature Reserve Guide – discover the wild Gloucestershire on your doorstep’ - 50th Anniversary, January 2011, Gloucestershire Wildlife Trust
- 'Where to see Wildlife in the Forest of Dean', January 2012, Gloucestershire Wildlife Trust
