= Clarke's Pool Meadow SSSI =

Biological Site of Special Scientific Interest in Gloucestershire, England

Clarke's Pool Meadow
- Site of Special Scientific Interest
- Location of Clarke's Pool Meadow.
- Area of search: Gloucestershire
- Grid reference: SO668061
- Coordinates: 51.753053°N 2.481631°W
- Interest: Biological
- Area: 1.8 ha (4.4 acres)
- Notification date: 1997

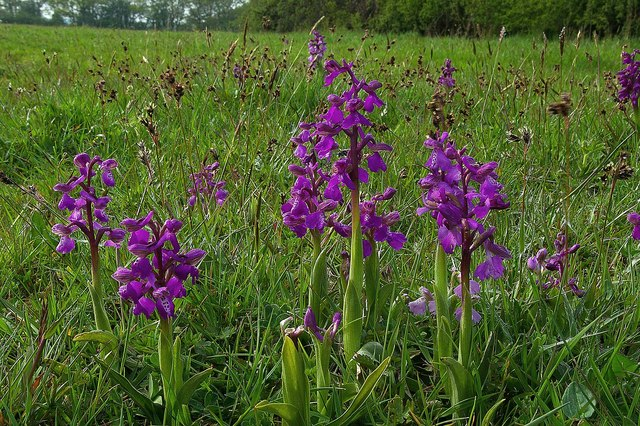
Green Winged Orchids grow in Clarke’s Pool Meadow

Clarke's Pool Meadow (grid reference SO668061) is a 1.8-hectare (4.4-acre) biological Site of Special Scientific Interest in Gloucestershire, notified in 1997. It lies on the flat top of 'Old Hill' about half a mile south of Blakeney. The site consists of two fields which were purchased by the Gloucestershire Wildlife Trust in 1997. The site was designated an SSSI in the same year and it is one of the finest surviving traditional hay meadows in Gloucestershire.

Similar meadows have been lost due to agricultural improvement. The site overlies Old Red Sandstone. This contributes to the unusual mix of grassland plants.

== Plants ==
The meadows support a show of thousands (estimated at 45,000) of green-winged orchid in May, a colony of some size in this part of Gloucestershire. Also flowering in the late spring are common twayblade, adder's-tongue, cowslip, bluebell, and pignut. Taller grass and flowers develop over the summer and produce a hay crop at that time. Recordings include quaking-grass, common knapweed, meadow vetchling, downy oat-grass, field scabious, meadow buttercup, yellow-rattle, oxeye daisy, common bird's-foot trefoil, goat's-beard, fairy flax and Devil's-bit scabious. Meadow saffron flowers following the hay cut.

== Invertebrates, mammals and bird life ==
The neutral meadow flora, broad hedges and the rough field margins support a diversity of invertebrates, small mammals and predators such as the barn owl.

== Conservation ==
The traditional method for management is hay cutting followed by sheep grazing. Hedges are maintained from natural species.

== Publications ==
- Kelham, A, Sanderson, J, Doe, J, Edgeley-Smith, M, et al., 1979, 1990, 2002 editions, 'Nature Reserves of the Gloucestershire Trust for Nature Conservation/Gloucestershire Wildlife Trust'
- Gloucestershire Wildlife Trust Nature Reserve Guide (January 2011)
- 'Where to see Wildlife in the Forest of Dean', January 2012, Gloucestershire Wildlife Trust

== SSSI Source ==
- Natural England SSSI information on the citation
- Natural England SSSI information on the Clarke's Pool Meadow unit
