= Swift's Hill SSSI =

Geological site in England

Swift's Hill
- Site of Special Scientific Interest
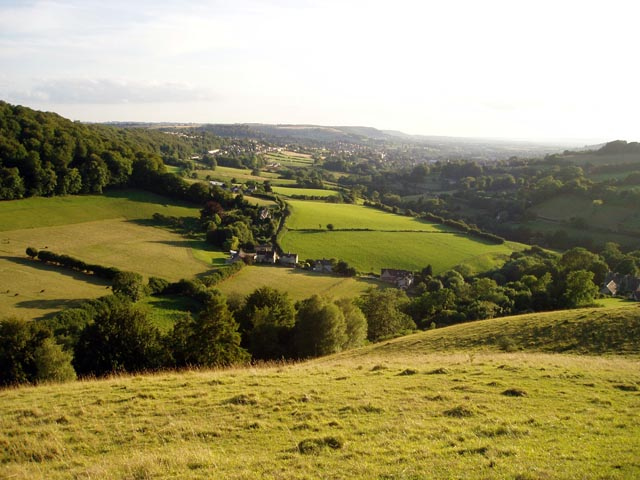
- Looking down from Swift's Hill nature reserve

- Location within Gloucestershire
- Location of Swift's Hill.
- Area of search: Gloucestershire
- Grid reference: SO877067
- Coordinates: 51.759299°N 2.178886°W
- Interest: Biological/Geological
- Area: 9.15 hectare
- Notification date: 1966

Swift's Hill (grid reference SO877067) is a 9.15-hectare (22.6-acre) biological and geological Site of Special Scientific Interest in Gloucestershire, notified in 1966 and renotified in 1984.

The site is owned and managed by the Gloucestershire Wildlife Trust. It was purchased from Mr F R Elliott in 1967 and is referred to as Elliott Reserve by the trust. It is, however, more widely known as Swift's Hill and designated as an SSSI under that name. A small stock-holding field (semi-improved pasture) was purchased for the trust by Swift Print of Stroud in 1989.

The reserve is on the eastern side of the Slad Valley, and one and a half miles north-east of Stroud. No rights are registered, but the hill is common land and is unfenced and used widely by members of the public. The hill is one of the smaller ancient Cotswold Commons and provides panoramic views of the Slad valley which is described by local author Laurie Lee in Cider with Rosie. The origin of the name is uncertain, but it may be from the many swifts which fly overhead.

== Geology ==
The hill itself is composed of Oolitic limestone. There is a small quarry in the north-west corner. Fossil-rich 'ragstones' are exposed and is one of the key sites for study of the geology of the Middle Jurassic period. There are both 'ragstones' (very fossiliferous) and 'freestones' (fragments of fossils). The fossilised remains of bivalves, brachiopods, corals and the occasional ammonite may be found in the screes.

== Grassland flora ==
The thin, well-drained Rendzina soils supports a diverse range of calcareous grassland flora. Over 130 different species of wildflowers and 13 different orchids are recorded. The reserve is renowned for its orchids which include the pyramidal orchid, fragrant orchid, early purple orchid, bee orchid, frog orchid, and autumn lady's-tresses.

Other spring, summer and autumn flowers in the meadow include cowslip, columbine, harebell, yellow-wort and autumn gentian. Viper's bugloss flowers in the quarry.

== Trees and scrub ==
The quarry supports some trees and scrub such as common whitebeam, ash, hawthorn and hazel.

== Invertebrates and reptiles ==
Common lizard, slowworm and adder are reported basking in the quarry area. The grassland flora supports good populations of small blue, green hairstreak, dingy skipper and marbled white butterflies. Over twenty-nine species have been recorded. Also seen are the day-flying moths such as six-spot burnet and cinnabar. Grasshoppers are common such as stripe-winged and rufous, the latter being at the western end of its range.

== Birds ==
The hill is circled by swifts in the summer. Kestrel and buzzard may be spotted overhead. Breeding birds include skylark, tree pipit and meadow pipit. The green woodpecker is attracted by the anthills.

== Conservation ==
Maintained through traditional grazing practices, the unimproved limestone grassland remains species-rich. Grazing helps control scrub growth and supports the diverse plant community. The reserve is open year-round, with the best visiting period from April to August, offering opportunities to observe its vibrant biodiversity. The range of plants requires the unimproved thin limestone soil, and on the dry slopes they are not in competition with more vigorous plants. The turf must be kept short and because many of them grow slowly, they need minimum disturbance.

== Publications ==
- Kelham, A, Sanderson, J, Doe, J, Edgeley-Smith, M, et al., 1979, 1990, 2002 editions, 'Nature Reserves of the Gloucestershire Trust for Nature Conservation/Gloucestershire Wildlife Trust'
- Elliott Nature Reserve at Swifts Hill – One of the County’s finest wildflower grasslands, (undated), Gloucestershire Wildlife Trust

== SSSI Source ==
- Natural England SSSI information on the citation
- Natural England SSSI information on the Swift's Hill unit
