= Chaceley Meadow SSSI =

Biological Site of Special Scientific Interest in Gloucestershire, England

Chaceley Meadow
- Site of Special Scientific Interest
- Location within Gloucestershire
- Location of Chaceley Meadow.
- Area of search: Gloucestershire
- Grid reference: SO857306
- Coordinates: 51.97413°N 2.20885°W
- Interest: biological
- Area: 1.8 ha (4.4 acres)
- Notification date: 1954

Chaceley Meadow (grid reference SO857306) is a 1.8-hectare (4.4-acre) biological Site of Special Scientific Interest in Gloucestershire, notified in 1954 and renotified in 1993. It lies on the eastern edge of Chaceley village and is about half a mile west of the River Severn.

The site is listed in the ‘Tewkesbury Borough Local Plan to 2011’, adopted March 2006, Appendix 3 'Nature Conservation',' as a Key Wildlife Site (KWS).

The site is owned (bought in 1994) and managed by the Gloucestershire Wildlife Trust. It is one of the county's finest unimproved wet meadows. Though it is some distance from the River Severn the meadow may flood in winter.

== Plants ==
A colourful variety of flowers may be seen throughout spring and summer. These include cuckoo flower, marsh-marigold, great burnet, meadowsweet, common knapweed, meadow vetchling, marsh ragwort, meadow buttercup, sorrel, ragged-robin, reed canary-grass, sweet vernal-grass and meadow brome. The wet conditions encourage many sedges including brown sedge, oval sedge, yellow sedge and carnation sedge. The slender spike-rush (Eleocharis uniglumis) grows in this meadow which is rare in Gloucestershire.

== Surroundings ==
The meadow is surrounded by mature hawthorn and blackthorn hedge and includes old white willow pollards. This habitat supports many birds, including tawny owl and turtle dove.

== Conservation ==
The meadow is traditionally managed by a late summer hay cut, which allows wildflowers to set their seeds. There is then cattle grazing. The willow pollards are recut regularly to reduce the risk of splitting. There are earlier cuts every 3 years to help to increase the frequency of rarer species found in the field which include common knapweed, yellow rattle, cuckoo flower, bird's foot trefoil and marsh bedstraw. This helps remove nutrients at the peak of the hay growing season.

== Publications ==
- Kelham, A, Sanderson, J, Doe, J, Edgeley-Smith, M, et al., 1979, 1990, 2002 editions, 'Nature Reserves of the Gloucestershire Trust for Nature Conservation/Gloucestershire Wildlife Trust'

== SSSI source ==
- Natural England SSSI information on the citation
- Natural England SSSI information on the Chaceley Meadow unit
