= Midger =

Protected area in Gloucestershire, England

- Site of Special Scientific Interest
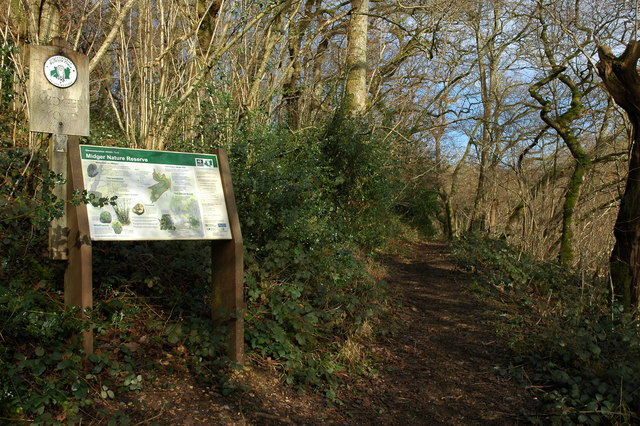
- Midger nature reserve entrance

- Location within Gloucestershire
- Location of Midger.
- Area of search: Gloucestershire
- Grid reference: ST797895
- Coordinates: 51.604°N 2.294°W
- Interest: Biological
- Area: 65.7 ha (162 acres)
- Notification date: 1966

Midger (grid reference ST797895) is a 65.7-hectare (162-acre) biological Site of Special Scientific Interest straddling the border of Gloucestershire and South Gloucestershire, notified in 1966 and renotified in 1984. Since the last revision in 1974, the size has been reduced to a 56-hectare (140-acre) site. It lies east of Hillesley, Gloucestershire and north of Hawkesbury Upton, South Gloucestershire. It is at the head of the Kilcott Valley.

There are six units of assessment.

Part of the site (grid reference ST794892) is part owned (and managed) by the Gloucestershire Wildlife Trust.

== The Wildlife Trust reserve ==
Fuller information is available from the Wildlife Trust reserves handbook, the Midger reserve publication and the Nature Reserves Guide for 2011. The reserve comprises Midger Wood which was purchased by the trust in 1965, Back Common, Whitewell Wood, Twizzle Well Piece, Wedgewood and Saddlewood Roughs, which is part of the Badminton Estate.

=== Woodland ===
This is ancient woodland and has a canopy comprising mainly ash (including coppiced stools), pedunculate oak and field maple, and some crab apple and holly. There has been some interplanting with beech, Scots pine, spruce and larch. The understorey is dominated by hazel. This also contains goat willow and dogwood.

=== Plants ===
The ground layer includes herb paris, green hellebore and lily-of-the-valley which grow amongst bluebell, yellow archangel, wood anemone, ramsons (wood garlic), wood-sorrel and many ferns.

The stream (Kilcott Brook). which is one of the features of the reserve, is edged by opposite-leaved golden-saxifrage and pendulous sedge. It has small waterfalls. Some of them are petrified with calcareous tufa deposits. The damp valley bottom below Saddlewood Roughs supports butterbur in the spring and meadow saffron in the autumn.

There are small glades in the hawthorn and blackthorn thickets in Back Common which indicates this area's past use as common grazing land. The rough banks in the north of the reserve have a typical limestone grassland flora including wild thyme, common rock-rose and early-purple orchid.

=== Other species ===
There are good populations of butterflies including chalkhill blue, marbled white, green hairstreak and the Duke of Burgundy fritillary. The bird life is supported by the diverse habitat. In the woods treecreeper, little owl, lesser spotted woodpecker, nuthatch, marsh tit, wood warbler and goldcrest have been recorded. In the stream area dipper and grey wagtail have been recorded. In the rough grassland areas meadow pipit and yellowhammer have been recorded.

Other notable species are yellow-necked field mouse, common dormouse and fallow deer. Nest boxes support the dormouse population.

=== Conservation ===
Conservation work in the reserve includes coppicing of hazel, thinning of young ash, and clearing of invasive scrub such as hawthorn, blackthorn and oak in areas designated as open grassland.

=== Items of interest ===
In March 1995 the Prince of Wales visited the Midger SSSI reserve, being one of the protected woodland reserves in the county. The guided walk included a demonstration of the production of barbecue charcoal from coppiced and fallen timber, a new Wildlife Trust venture at that time.

== Publications ==
- Kelham, A, Sanderson, J, Doe, J, Edgeley-Smith, M, et al., 1979, 1990, 2002 editions, 'Nature Reserves of the Gloucestershire Trust for Nature Conservation/Gloucestershire Wildlife Trust'
- (undated), mid-late 1980s, 'Midger Reserve Kilcot', Gloucestershire Trust for Nature Conservation
- 'Midger Nature Reserve – Wonderful ancient woodland in a hidden valley', (undated), Gloucestershire Wildlife Trust

== SSSI Source ==
- Natural England SSSI information on the citation
- Natural England SSSI information on the Midger units
