= Collinpark Wood SSSI =

Biological Site of Special Scientific Interest in Gloucestershire, England

Collinpark Wood
- Site of Special Scientific Interest
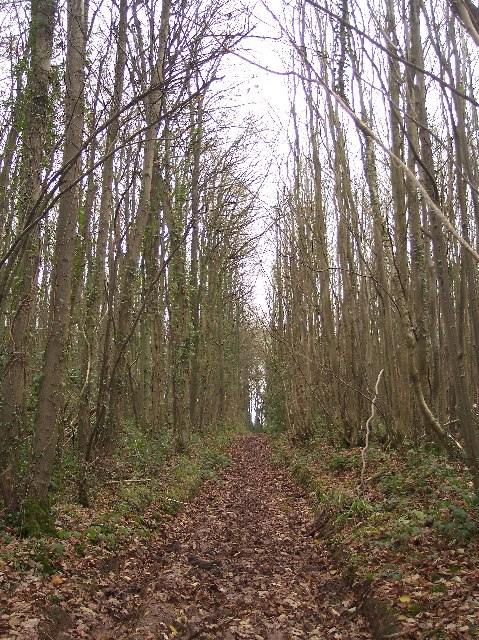
- Collinpark Wood - old route way

- Location within Gloucestershire
- Location of Collinpark Wood.
- Area of search: Gloucestershire
- Grid reference: SO750278
- Coordinates: 51.948579°N 2.364418°W
- Interest: Biological
- Area: 66.69 ha (164.8 acres)
- Notification date: 1966

Collinpark Wood (grid reference SO750278) is a 66.69-hectare (164.8-acre) biological Site of Special Scientific Interest in Gloucestershire, notified in 1966, revised in 1974 and renotified in 1983. There was a boundary change in 1983. There are seven units of assessment. Unit 1 (grid reference SO747279) is a 15-hectare (37-acre) area owned and managed by the Gloucestershire Wildlife Trust. The trust purchased this part of the wood in 1979 with grant aid from WWF. The site is listed in the 'Forest of Dean Local Plan Review' as a Key Wildlife Site (KWS).

The wood lies two miles north-east of Newent in rolling countryside near the River Leadon. The ancient woodland had been managed as coppice for many hundreds of years. Until the 1850s timber from it had been used to produce charcoal for the iron industry. The straight paths within the wood are likely to be tramways. Along the western edge of the wood owned by the Gloucestershire Wildlife Trust is a cutting and embankment. These are evidence of a failed attempt to build a railway line to link Worcester and the Forest of Dean coalfields.

The wood is sited on Triassic Keuper Marl rocks. These produce acid soils and influence the flora and fauna of the area.

== History ==
A publication about the nature reserve includes a detailed history of the wood. The Pauntley Estate, including what is now called Collinpark Wood, was owned by the Whittington family from mediaeval times to the 1540s. Richard (Dick) Whittington may have been born at Pauntley Court and is likely to have played and hunted in what was then called Pauntley Wood. In the 1540s Pauntley Estate passed to the Somerset family, and Saxton's map of 1577 shows Pauntley Park, indicating that the wood had been converted to a then fashionable deer park. The name Collinpark dates to around this time. In 1821 Pauntley was purchased by David Ricardo, MP. It was his son Osman who invested in the Worcester, Dean Forest and Monmouth Railway Company. The company failed and development stopped and various trees, including sweet chestnut, were planted in the abandoned area. This is now secondary woodland.

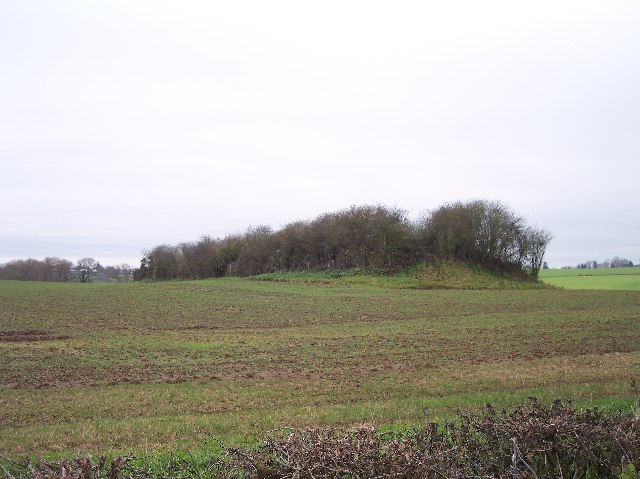
The attempted Worcester, Forest of Dean, Monmouth Railway at edge of Collinpark Wood

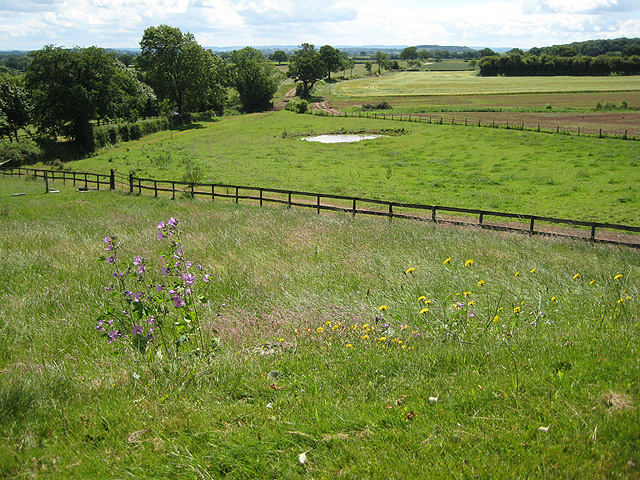
Collinpark Wood viewed from Pauntley

== Woodland canopy ==
The woodland canopy consists of mostly small-leaved lime and sessile oak. The wood supports one of the highest concentrations of the wild service-tree in Gloucestershire. Other species include wild cherry, ash, field maple, silver birch, pedunculate oak and aspen. The under canopy includes hazel, broom, goat willow and guelder-rose.

== Ground flora ==
The ground flora include common cow-wheat, great woodrush, wavy hair-grass, foxglove and slender St John's wort. These are all plans which grow in acid conditions. The more usual woodland plants include bluebell, yellow archangel, wood sage and wood-sorrel. Mosses, liverworts and fungi thrive in the environment.

== Birds and other species ==
Birdlife includes willow warbler, chiff-chaff, blackcap and the great spotted woodpecker. Some species of snail, fly and beetle are indicators of ancient woodland. A bat box scheme operates.

== Conservation ==
In the nature reserve, areas are coppiced to create butterfly glades. The high forest is promoted as a future timber source. Areas are left to provide comparison data for management plans.

== Publications ==
- Kelham, A, Sanderson, J, Doe, J, Edgeley-Smith, M, et al., 1979, 1990, 2002 editions, 'Nature Reserves of the Gloucestershire Trust for Nature Conservation/Gloucestershire Wildlife Trust'
- 'Collin Park Wood Nature Reserve – Dick Whittington’s ancient lime and oak wood', (undated) Gloucestershire Wildlife Trust

== SSSI Source ==
- Natural England SSSI information on the citation
- Natural England SSSI information on the Collin Park Wood units
