= Badgeworth SSSI, Gloucestershire =

Protected area in Gloucestershire, England

Badgeworth
- Site of Special Scientific Interest
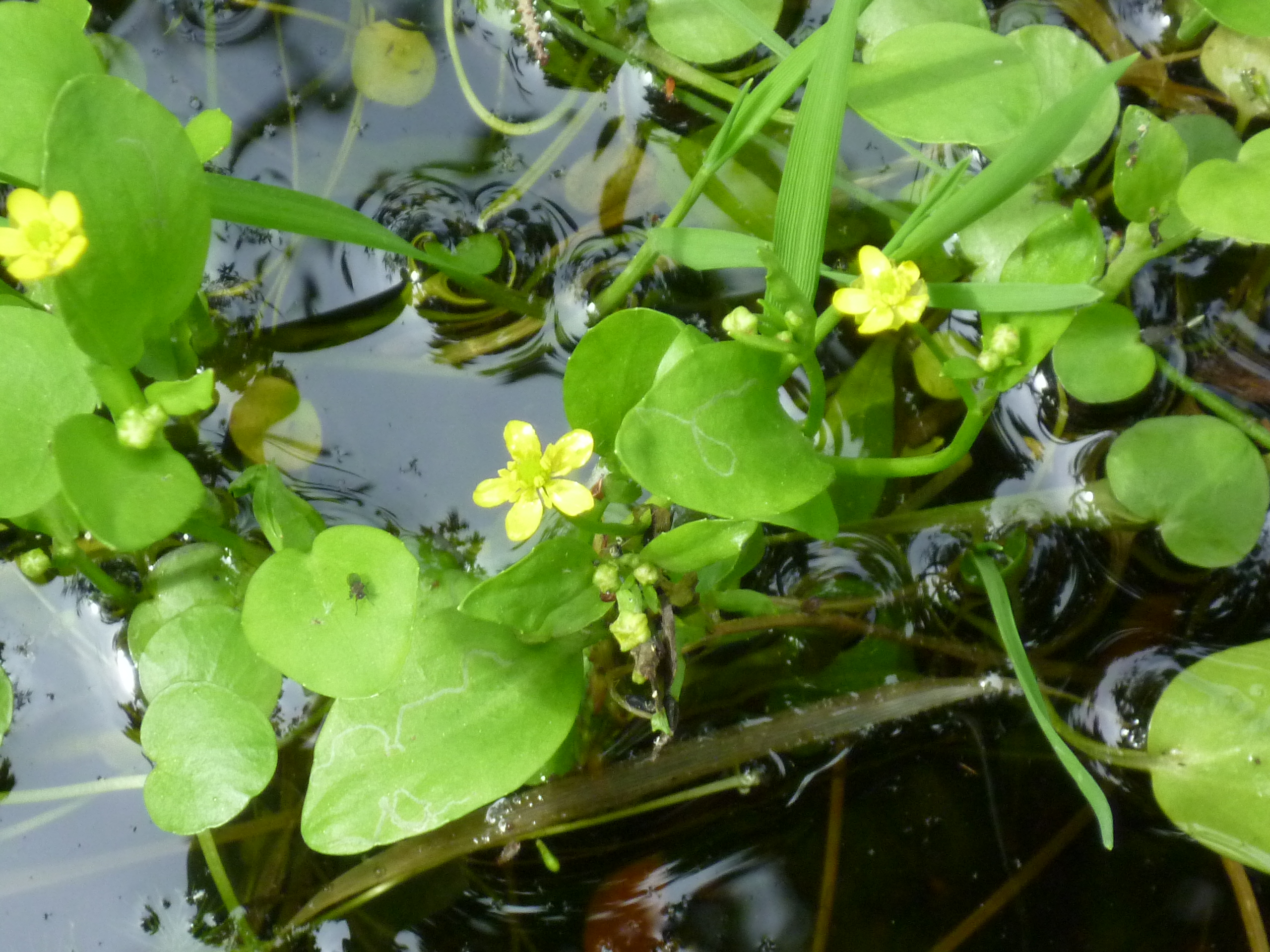
- Closeup of flowering of Adder's-tongue Spearwort at the Badgeworth nature reserve in June 2012
- Location of Badgeworth.
- Area of search: Gloucestershire
- Grid reference: SO911206
- Coordinates: 51.884338°N 2.129985°W
- Interest: Biological
- Area: 3.08 ha (7.6 acres)
- Notification date: 1954

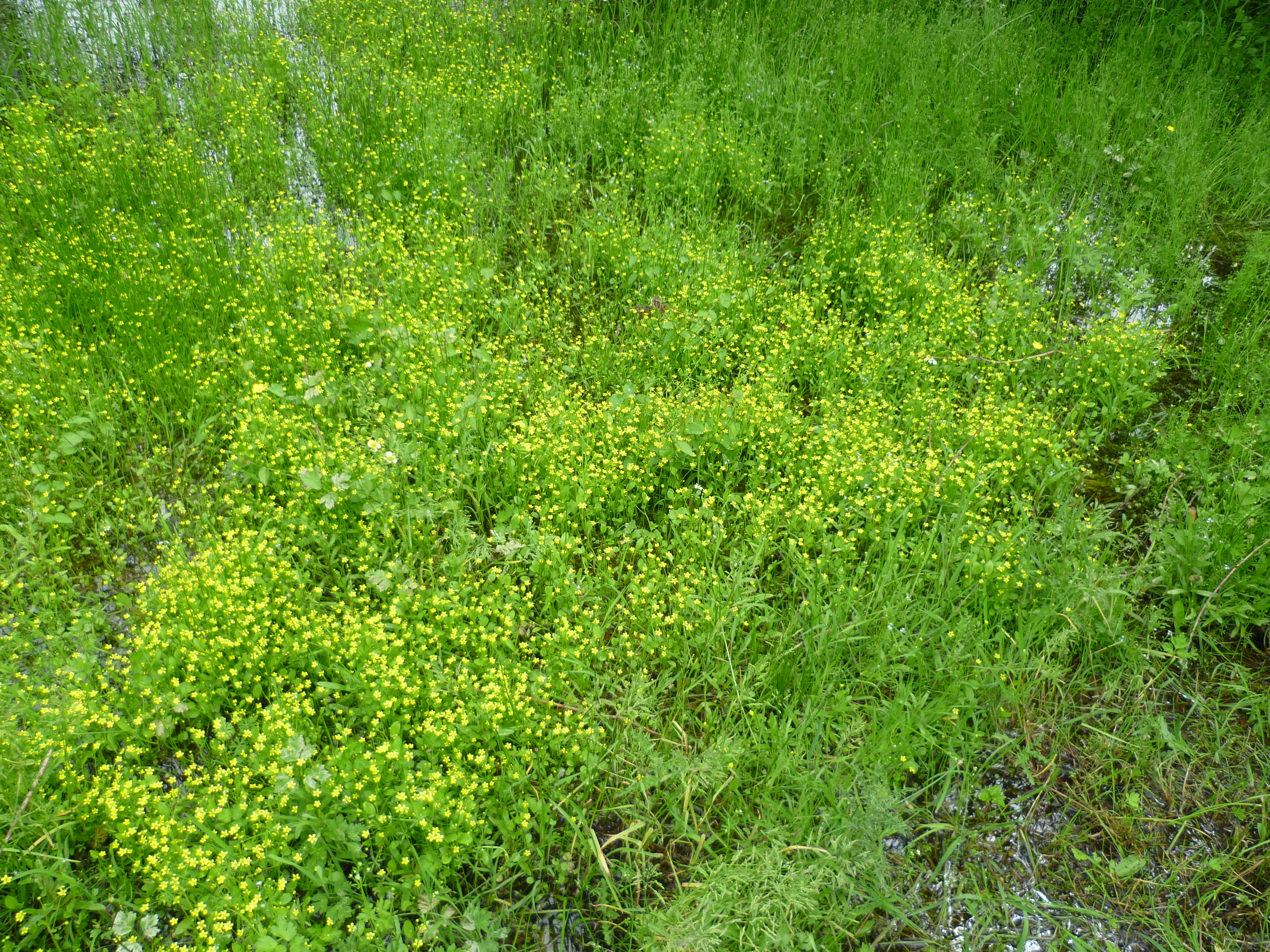
Flowering of Adder's-tongue Spearwort at the Badgeworth nature reserve in June 2012

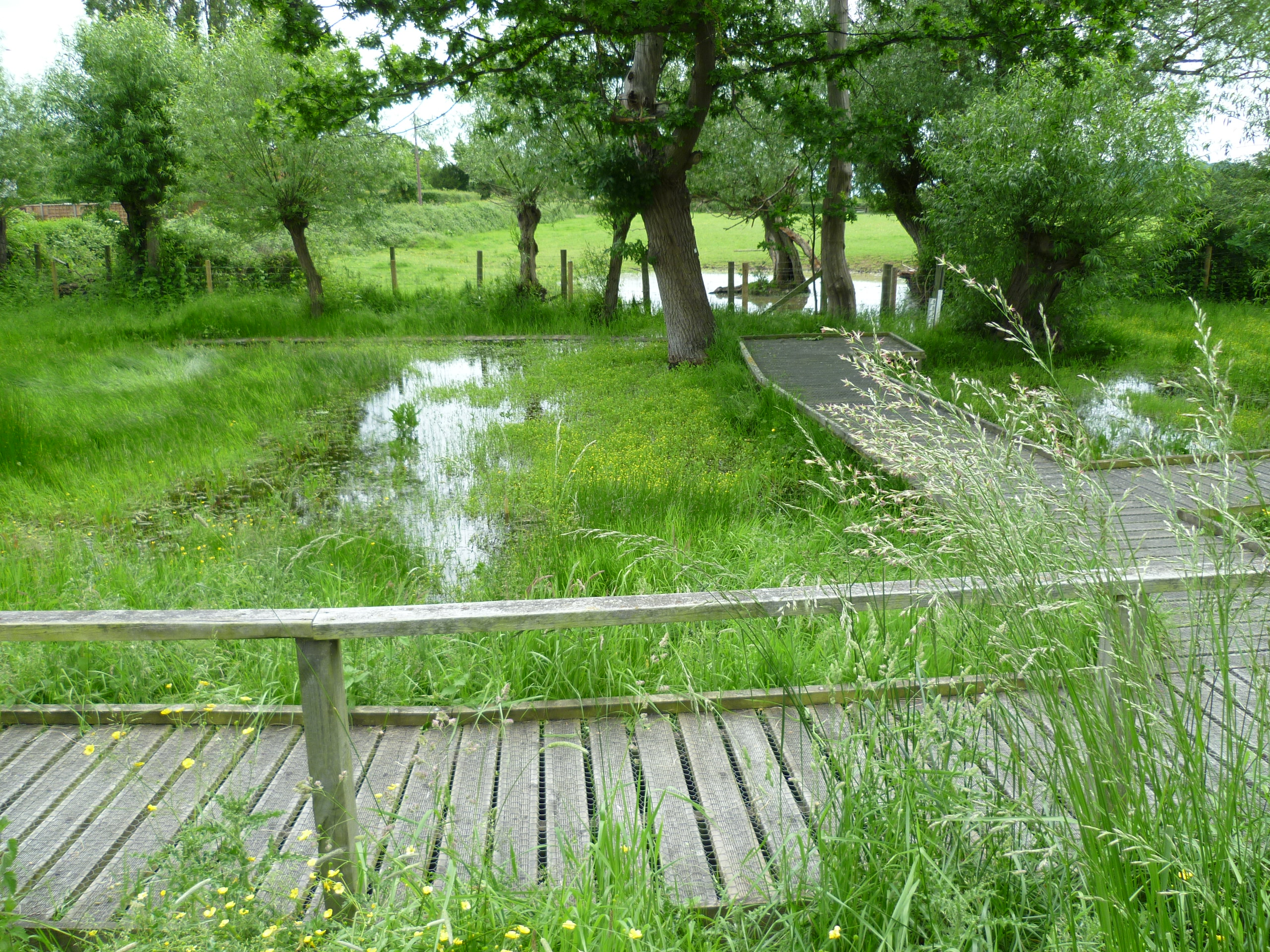
Badgeworth nature reserve walkways over pond

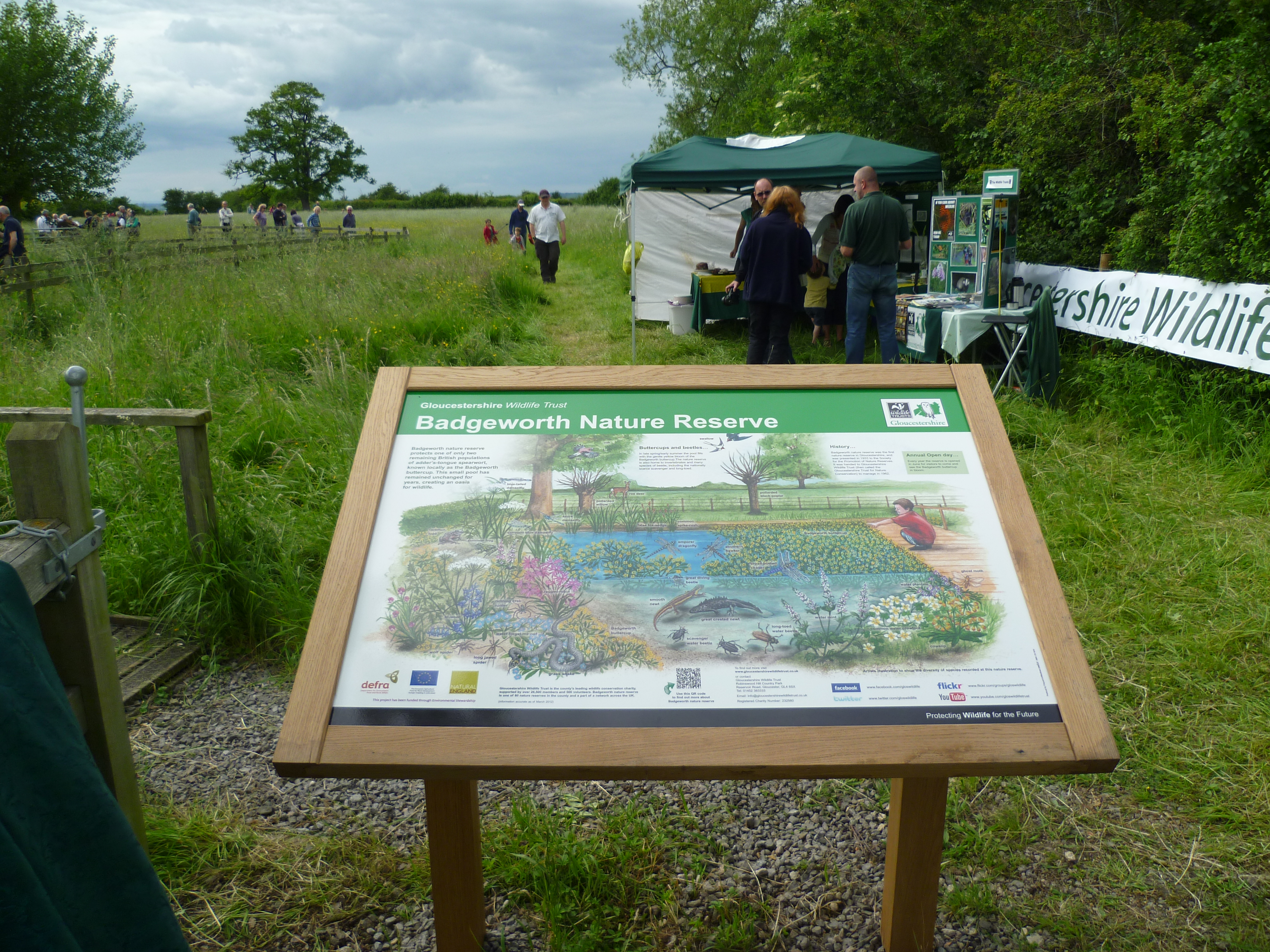
Badgeworth nature reserve annual Open Day 2012

Badgeworth SSSI (grid reference SO 911206) is a 3.08-hectare (7.6-acre) biological Site of Special Scientific Interest in Gloucestershire notified in 1954 and renotified in 1983. Part of this site (grid reference SO910206) is owned and managed by the Gloucestershire Wildlife Trust as a nature reserve.

There are two units of assessment. The nature reserve is unit 1 and the northerly field is unit 2.

It is one of only two sites in the United Kingdom where the Adder's-tongue Spearwort (Ranunculus ophioglossifolius) occurs; in Gloucestershire this species has acquired the name "Badgeworth buttercup" through its association with this site. The site is near the Gloucestershire village of Badgeworth. The other known population is at Inglestone Common near Wickwar in South Gloucestershire.

The site is a depression on Blue Lias clay, which fills seasonally with rain water and run-off from adjoining pasture to create the wetland habitat which is needed for the plant.

== History ==
The reserve handbook contains a timeline history. The original reserve dates from 1935 when it was only 290 sq. metres. In 1964 an entry in the Guinness Book of Records described Badgeworth as the world's smallest nature reserve. A further 100 sq. metres was added in 1975. A field of pasture was added in 2002. The seasonal pond is known as Cold Pool which is marshy grassland. The area added in 1975 is known as Warren's Pool. The SSSI designation includes another field of pasture which is not part of the reserve. Adder's-tongue Spearwort has been known at the Badgeworth (Cold Pool) site since 1890. A stock drinking pond was created (now known as Warren's Pool). The site was presented to the Society for the Promotion of Nature Reserves (now the Royal Society of Wildlife Trusts) in 1933 and was the first official nature reserve in Gloucestershire. A local management committee was formed and the area was fenced, gated and walkways created over the wet ground. The reserve currently has walkways for people to view the buttercup and there is an annual Open Day event as the reserve is kept locked. The site was given to the Gloucestershire Trust for Nature Conservation (now the Gloucestershire Wildlife Trust) in 1962 and was the first reserve to be managed by the Trust in Gloucestershire. It has been owned by the Trust since 1991.

== Description of Adder's-tongue Spearwort ==
It is a variable, much-branched, over-wintering annual which normally flowers in late May. Its root system consists of long branched fibres which spread in whorls from the lower joints of the stem. The stems and leaves are a pale yellowish-green and the upper sides of the leaves are glossy. The name Adder's-tongue or Snake's-tongue describes the leaves. The flowers are relatively small and have canary-yellow petals. A single plant may have many flowers. These produce a large quantity of seed in a season. Ripe seed was collected in 1991, and sent for storage in the Kew Seed bank. A fuller description is available in the reserve handbook.

== Species ==
The Gloucestershire Trust for Nature Conservation/Gloucestershire Wildlife Trust handbook includes species information. The Badgeworth reserve handbook includes a current full species list.

Adder's-tongue Spearwort numbers fluctuate from year to year, and depend on the climatic conditions during the autumn germination period. June is the normal flowering period. This wetland site supports a number of other plants, which include Lesser Spearwort, Common Water-crowfoot, Narrow-leaved Water-plantain, Marsh Speedwell, Pink Water-speedwell, Fen Bedstraw and Marsh Foxtail.

Since 1963 to 2008, 305 species of beetle have been recorded. Common Frogs and Great Crested, Smooth and Palmate newts breed in the ponds.

== Conservation ==
Sections of dense growth of Reed Sweet-grass and Creeping Bent are removed in the autumn to create areas of bare soil necessary for germination of Adder's tongue Spearwort. Pollarding of the adjacent willows controls light and the water levels.

There is a potential risk of a catastrophic event wiping out this isolated population of Adder's-tongue Spearwort with the gradual encroachment of Cheltenham's boundaries. A new pool has been built to try to establish another colony at the far end of the reserve. A handful of flowers has appeared through natural process. This could be an old seed bank or spread on the feet of animals or birds.

== Publications ==
- Hanbury, F J, (1890), 'Ranunculus ophioglossifolius in East Gloucestershire', Journal of Botany, Vol 28, p 282 (first record for Adder's-tongue Spearwort at Badgeworth)
- Moss, C E, (1920), 'The Cambridge British Flora, Vol 3', (contains an illustration by E W Hunnybun, of a Badgeworth specimen)
- Guy, C, Haigh, D, Harris, Lucy, Harris, Lyn, Parker, J, Ralphs, I, Tandy, C, (1977 edition edited Holland, S) et al., 1966, 1967, 1977, 2007 editions, 'Badgeworth Nature Reserve Handbook' Gloucestershire Trust for Nature Conservation, Gloucestershire Wildlife Trust
- Dring, M J and Frost, L C, (1971), 'Studies of Ranunculus ophioglossifolius in relation to its conservation at the Badgeworth Nature Reserve, Gloucestershire, England', International Journal of Biological Conservation, Vol 4, pp 48–56
- Kelham, A, Sanderson, J, Doe, J, Edgeley-Smith, M, et al., 1979, 1990, 2002 editions, 'Nature Reserves of the Gloucestershire Trust for Nature Conservation/Gloucestershire Wildlife Trust'
- Frost, L C, (1981), 'The study of Ranunculus ophioglossifolius and its successful conservation at the Badgeworth Nature Reserve'. In 'The biological aspects of rare plant conservation' (ed. Synge, H), John Wiley and Sons
- Marren, P, (1999), 'Britain's Rare Flowers', Poyser Natural History (contains an account of Adder's-tongue Spearwort and the reserve)
- Briggs, J D, (2005), 'The Badgeworth Buttercup - the smallest reserve gets bigger', British Wildlife, Vol 16, Number 5, pp 305–312

== SSSI Source ==
- Natural England SSSI information on the citation
- Natural England SSSI information on the Badgeworth units
