= Chedworth Nature Reserve =

Nature reserve in Gloucestershire, England

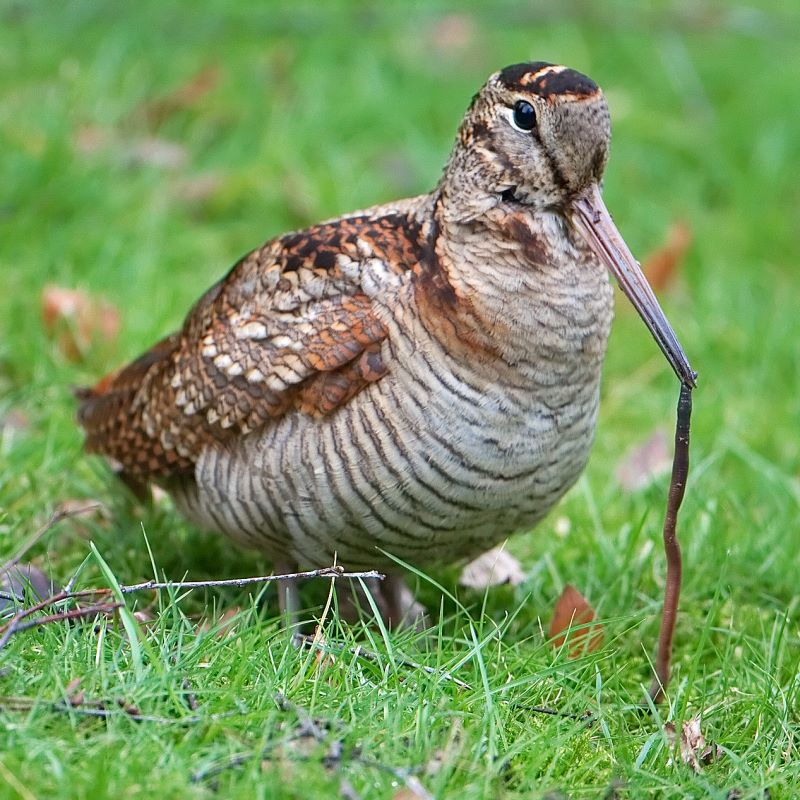
- Example - woodcock (Scolopax rusticola)

- Location within Gloucestershire
- Interactive map of Chedworth Nature Reserve
- Type: Gloucestershire Wildlife Trust nature reserve
- Location: between Chedworth and Withington
- Coordinates: 51°49′39.89″N 1°55′51.7″W
- Area: 14.8 acres (6.0 ha)
- Created: 1969
- Operator: Gloucestershire Wildlife Trust
- Status: Open all year, restricted access to adjacent woodland (public footpath only)

Chedworth Nature Reserve (grid reference SP048143) is a 6-hectare (15-acre) nature reserve in Gloucestershire. The site is listed in the 'Cotswold District' Local Plan 2001-2011 as a Key Wildlife Site (KWS).

The Chedworth Nature Reserve is owned and managed by the Gloucestershire Wildlife Trust and was purchased in 1969. It was one of the earliest acquisitions of the trust which was formed earlier in the decade in 1961.

Related sites Chedworth Railway Tunnel and Chedworth Woods are also listed in the 'Cotswold District' Local Plan 2001-2011 as Key Wildlife Sites (KWS).

Chedworth Cutting Fault, Chedworth South Villa Cutting and Chedworth Tufa Site are listed in the 'Cotswold District' Local Plan 2001-2011 as Regionally Important Geological Sites (RIGS).

== Location and habitat ==
The reserve is located in the heart of the Cotswolds and is situated between the villages of Chedworth and Withington. It is on the south side of the River Coln Valley. The reserve is a relatively long stretch of former railway line (Midland & South Western Junction Railway to become the Great Western Railway). It is disused track-bed, railway cuttings and steep embankment. The line opened in 1891 and closed in 1961.

The reserve is some 1800 yards long and is through ancient woodland. The woodland, Chedworth Woods, is one of the largest areas of such woodland in the Cotswolds. The reserve adjoins Chedworth Roman Villa, a National Trust site.

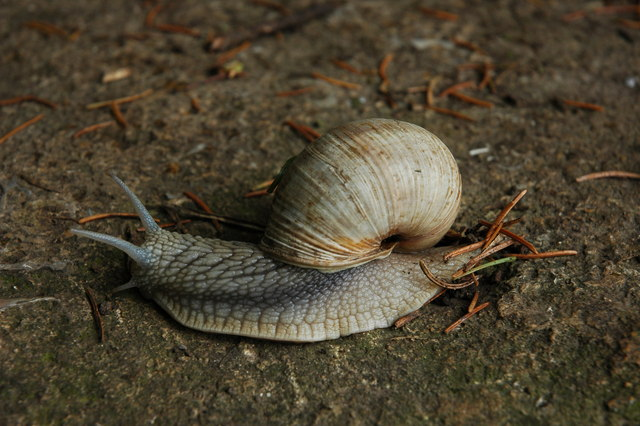
Roman snail (Helix pomatia) in Chedworth Woods

The reserve terminates at the south end at the closed Chedworth Tunnel. Colonies of protected bats are recorded as hibernating in this tunnel and roost at other times of the year. The entrance is covered with a grille for their protection, and to allow the bats access.

The reserve terminates at the north end at a lane called The White Way.

There is a tufa spring close to the tunnel. Water containing lime emerges from underground. It flows over rocks and plants and they become covered with limescale. This is an area for liverworts and mosses.

There are two embankment areas; the southern one is near the tunnel. The northern one is drier and supports a limestone grassland flora.

== Geological interest ==
The railway construction led to the exposure of c. 180 million year old Cotswold limestone. The protection of these exposures was one of the main reasons why the trust purchased the site. The Middle Jurassic oolitic limestones formed as layers of sediment in the shallow tropical seas. The structures and fossils in the different beds are significant research resources for investigating and evaluating the environmental conditions and lifeforms of those times. The bed exposures in the reserve are mostly level, but faults are visible and there are breaks in continuity.

The cuttings in the reserve show a sequence in the Bajocian stage and are considered to be one of the most accessible and best in the country. Fossils which may be seen in the limestone scree are bivalve, brachipod and echinoid. Specimen collection is only from the scree and not permitted from the exposures.

== Biological interest ==
Chedworth Woods, through which the reserve passes, are semi-natural woodland. There is pedunculate oak and ash. There is beech and conifers. There is coppiced hazel. The reserve supports ash, hazel and dogwood. primrose and greater butterfly-orchid have spread from the surrounding woodland. The trackbed supports hairy violet, autumn gentian, blue fleabane and large thyme (Thymus pulegioides).

The margins of the track support various shrubs which includes the wayfaring tree. Woodland flora such as bluebell and ramsons thrive, and rides in the drier woodland areas support wild strawberry.

The northern embankment supports plants such a common milkwort, common centaury and white clover.

A variety of woodland birds have been recorded and these include tawny owl, nuthatch and wood warbler. The reserve is known for the presence of woodcock. Deer use the site and recorded are fallow deer, roe deer and muntjac. Adders may be found on the site and there are warning signs. Warm, humid weather may result in the emergence of the local Roman snail. Dormice are recorded, and the hazel coppice provides a good habitat for them. These are a protected species.

Butterflies appearing in the more open, sunny areas include the speckled wood, comma and silver-washed fritillary.

== Conservation ==
The priority work is to ensure that the geological exposures are maintained.

== Publications ==
- Kelham, A, Sanderson, J, Doe, J, Edgeley-Smith, M, et al., 1979, 1990, 2002 editions, 'Nature Reserves of the Gloucestershire Trust for Nature Conservation/Gloucestershire Wildlife Trust'
- 1986, 'Chedworth Nature Reserve: Booklet 1, Introduction', Gloucestershire Trust for Nature Conservation
- 'Chedworth Nature Reserve - Scenic railway to woodland refuge and geology trail', (undated) Gloucestershire Wildlife Trust
- 'Nature Reserve Guide – discover the wild Gloucestershire on your doorstep' - 50th Anniversary, January 2011, Gloucestershire Wildlife Trust
