= Bull Cross, The Frith and Juniper Hill =

Site of Special Scientific Interest in Gloucestershire, England

- Site of Special Scientific Interest
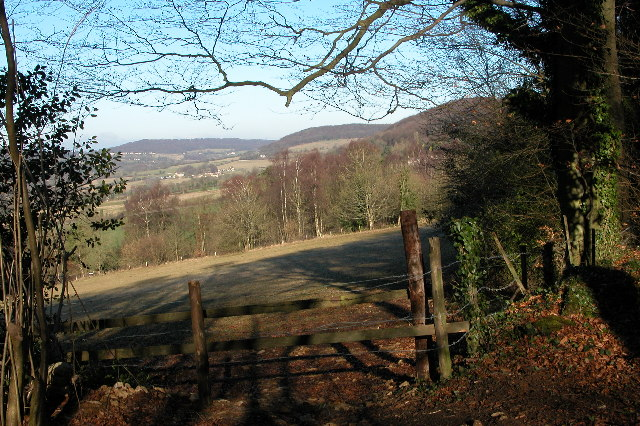
- The Frith
- Location of Bull Cross, The Frith and Juniper Hill.
- Area of search: Gloucestershire
- Grid reference: SO872083
- Coordinates: 51.773674°N 2.186189°W
- Interest: Biological/Geological
- Area: 42.33 ha (104.6 acres)
- Notification date: 1954

Bull Cross, The Frith and Juniper Hill (grid reference SO872083) is a 42.33-hectare (104.6-acre) biological and geological Site of Special Scientific Interest in Gloucestershire, notified in 1954. The site is listed in the ‘Stroud District’ Local Plan, adopted November 2005, Appendix 6 (online for download) as an SSSI and Regionally Important Geological Site (RIGS).

The site lies within the Cotswold Area of Outstanding Natural Beauty and is part registered as common land and part owned and managed as a nature reserve by the Gloucestershire Wildlife Trust.

The site has 4 units of assessment, the largest of which is The Frith, called Frith Wood (Morley Penistan Memorial) by the Gloucestershire Wildlife Trust. Morley Penistan was a former chairman of the trust and forester who was much involved with the management and conservation of the wood.

== Biological interest ==
The site, which is on the Jurassic limestone of the western Cotswolds, is a diverse area of ancient beech woodland, unimproved grassland, scrub and disused quarries. Bull Cross is unimproved calcareous grassland; The Frith is broadleaved woodland which comprises mostly beech, and Juniper Hill supports ash, scrub, unimproved calcareous grassland and old quarries.

=== Juniper Hill ===
- Natural England Unit 4 Juniper Hill

The woodland makeup, which is dominated by ash, includes yew and a shrub layer of hazel and hawthorn. The ground flora is dominated by bramble and dog's mercury. A secondary woodland to the north includes silver birch.

The grassland is semi-natural and the dominant species is upright brome. Also recorded are quaking grass, cock's foot, cowslip and other limestone herbs. Significant numbers of orchids flourish on the site including musk orchid, but these are threatened by invasion of scrub such as hawthorn. Yew, whitebeam and juniper are scattered on the site.

=== Bull Cross ===
- Natural England Unit 6 (was 2 & 3) Bull Cross

The flora is similar to that found on Juniper Hill, though considered less abundant.

=== The Frith ===
- Natural England Unit 1 - The Frith

Approximately 80% of the tree canopy is beech and is managed for timber. Other trees present are ash and whitebeam. Holly, yew and hazel, and regenerating beech and ash, form the scrub layer. Bramble and sweet woodruff are present and rare plants such as white helleborine, broad-leaved helleborine, columbine and common wintergreen. Woodland flora also includes lesser periwinkle, bluebell, yellow archangel and early purple orchid.

The wood is 'fungi rich' and a wide range of terrestrial molluscs have been recorded.

== Geological interest ==
- Bull Cross, The Frith and Juniper Hill SSSI - GEOLOGY (005)

=== Frith Quarry ===
Frith Quarry is a nationally important geological site providing exposures of Middle Jurassic rocks. These are considered to be of great significance in interpreting the Inferior Oolite succession of the Cotswolds. Specimens collected, and the exposures of Oolite Marl and Lower Trigonia Grit, have provided rich brachipod and ammonite faunas. The ammonite faunas are significant in the Cotswolds being rare, and thus the site is important for geological research into the Jurassic period.

== Frith Wood nature reserve ==
Frith Wood is about three miles north-east of Stroud and is considered a local landmark. It straddles the hill-top between the valleys of Painswick and Slad. This is an ancient wood and became a Gloucestershire Wildlife Trust nature reserve in 1966. It was managed under lease from the Workman family until it was purchased in 1987 with grants from the National Heritage Memorial Fund, Nature Conservancy Council, World Wide Fund for Nature, Countryside Commission, Stroud District Council, Gloucestershire County Council and a donation from Soroptomist International of Cheltenham.

=== History ===
The name 'Frith' is Saxon for a wooded enclosure. The wood has probably been managed as mixed wood-pasture and beech coppice since those times. The current high forest aspect originates from beech seed which was planted after the Napoleonic Wars. The beechwood successful regeneration, and its rich flora and fauna, provide a good example of ancient woodland in the Cotswold area.

An 'Arcadian' retreat was created in Frith Wood in the mid-1700s by Benjamin Hyett of Painswick House. This is called 'Pan's Lodge' being dedicated to Pan, god of wine, the pursuit of pleasure.

A painting by Thomas Robins of 1757 shows a small house overlooking the 'Panswyck' valley. This is surrounded by 'elegant' woodland walks and a plantation. Frith Wood was 'renamed' at the time to Coldbourn Grove. The site had disappeared by the 1820s and only a mound is left. Some of the garden plants remain growing in the woodland. There is a small old quarry in Frith Wood which was probably used for enclosure walls and even for building Pan's Lodge.

The old road from Birdlip to Stroud passed through Frith Wood Common until the turnpike (now the B4070) was opened in the 18th century.

=== Fauna ===
Birdlife includes wood warbler, marsh tit and green woodpecker. The molluscs recorded are Limax cinereoniger and Zenobiella subrufescens, which are species occurring in ancient woodland. The lapidary snail is also recorded. Hundreds of varieties of fungus have been found in the reserve.

=== Conservation ===
Regeneration has been a natural process as part of the management plan since 1960. This is supported by selective thinning and felling of some mature timber trees. Invasive sycamore has been controlled by methods to leave standing dead wood (ringbarking) and also removal.

== Publications ==
- Kelham, A, Sanderson, J, Doe, J, Edgeley-Smith, M, et al., 1979, 1990, 2002 editions, 'Nature Reserves of the Gloucestershire Trust for Nature Conservation/Gloucestershire Wildlife Trust'
- 'Frith Wood – Morley Penistan Nature Reserve – A magnificent ancient beechwood', (undated), Gloucestershire Wildlife Trust

== SSSI Source ==
- Natural England SSSI information on the citation
- Natural England SSSI information on the Bull Cross, The Frith And Juniper Hill units
