= Box Farm Meadows SSSI =

Biological Site of Special Scientific Interest in Gloucestershire, England

- Site of Special Scientific Interest
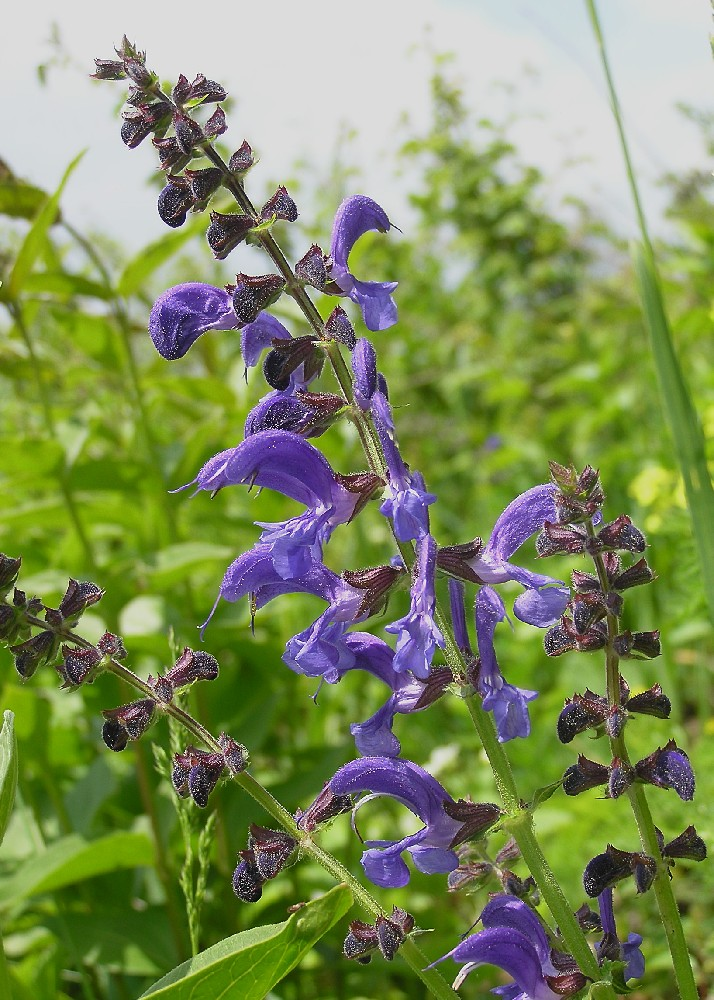
- Example - Meadow Clary (Salvia pratensis)

- Location within Gloucestershire
- Location of Box Farm Meadows SSSI.
- Area of search: Gloucestershire
- Grid reference: ST865997
- Coordinates: 51.69633°N 2.196°W
- Interest: Biological
- Area: 8.3 ha (21 acres)
- Notification date: 1985

Box Farm Meadows (Stuart Fawkes reserve) (grid reference ST865997) is a 8.3-hectare (21-acre) biological Site of Special Scientific Interest in Gloucestershire, notified in 1985. This was formerly known as Balls Green Pastures. The reserve is situated at the southern edge of Box village and one mile east of Nailsworth.

The site is owned and managed by the Gloucestershire Wildlife Trust. It was purchased in 1978 and named in the memory of Mr F S Fawkes, a local naturalist and a founder member and former Vice-President of the Gloucestershire Wildlife Trust (formerly the Gloucestershire Trust for Nature Conservation). Grant aid was received for its purchase from the World-wide Fund for Nature (WWF), Nature Conservancy Council (NCC), the Langtree Trust and the Dulverton Trust.

== The site ==
The reserve consists of two meadows and supports one of the largest United Kingdom populations of the rare Meadow Clary. It is on Inferior Oolitic limestone and Fuller's Earth and faces south. It overlies extensive mine workings. These produced high quality freestone used for building in the Stroud area.

== Plants ==
The Meadow Clary blooms in June and July, its flowers being a brilliant blue. The site also support a variety of typical limestone grassland plants which include Common Rock-rose, Cowslip, Lady's Bedstraw, Common Restharrow, Dwarf Thistle, Burnet-saxifrage, Field Scabious, Quaking-grass and Green-winged Orchids.

== Conservation ==
The conservation is centred on promoting the spread of Meadow Clary, but maintaining and developing the overall wildlife interest. Cattle grazing is used to prevent the growth of coarse grass and restricts scrub. Thistles are cut annually and any ragwort growth is pulled.

== Publications ==
- Kelham, A, Sanderson, J, Doe, J, Edgeley-Smith, M, et al, 1979, 1990, 2002 editions, 'Nature Reserves of the Gloucestershire Trust for Nature Conservation/Gloucestershire Wildlife Trust'
- 2011, 'Nature Reserve Guide', Gloucestershire Wildlife Trust, publication to celebrate its 50th anniversary

== SSSI Source ==
- Natural England SSSI information on the citation
- Natural England SSSI information on the Box Farm Meadows unit
