= Hobbs Quarry SSSI, Longhope =

Site of Special Scientific Interest in Gloucestershire

Hobbs Quarry, Longhope
- Site of Special Scientific Interest
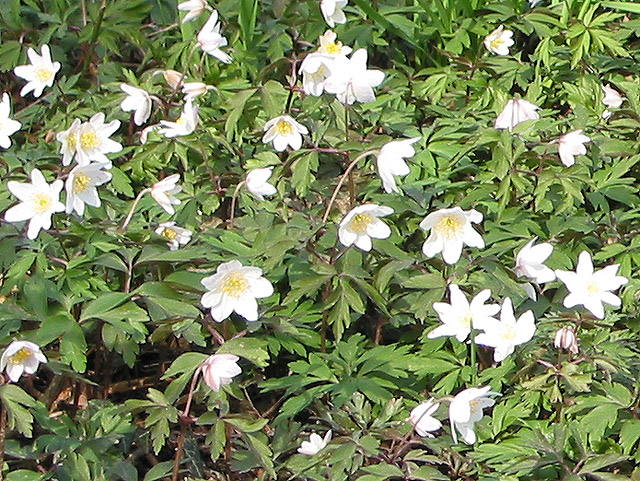
- Wood anemones (Anemone nemorosa) in a Forest of Dean wood

- Location within Gloucestershire
- Location of Hobbs Quarry, Longhope.
- Area of search: Gloucestershire
- Grid reference: SO695195
- Coordinates: 51.873683°N 2.443701°W
- Interest: Biological/Geological
- Area: 1 ha (2.5 acres)
- Notification date: 1966

Hobbs Quarry, Longhope (grid reference SO695195) is a 1-hectare (2.5-acre) geological and biological Site of Special Scientific Interest in Gloucestershire, England, notified in 1966. It is situated midway between Longhope and Dursley Cross in the Forest of Dean. Adjacent woods are Kiln Wood and Coleman's Wood. The site was managed by the Gloucestershire Wildlife Trust. Ownership changed to an independent Charitable Trust - Hobbs Nature Reserve Trust - on 1 August 2023. The Management Plan is similar to the one GWT had agreed with Natural England, combining conservation and research work on the geological exposures and preservation of the valuable natural environment. An explanatory website is under development to aid any groups planning educational visits. Local specialists are available to assist with these if required.

The site is listed in the 'Forest of Dean Local Plan Review' as a Key Wildlife Site (KWS).

The quarry is known for its geological exposures, and was originally about a mile long extending into Kiln Wood, which is to the north of this reserve. The southernmost part of the quarry was used as a public landfill site and destroyed and the northernmost part became under threat from fly-tipping. The Nature Conservancy Council designated the site an SSSI and undertook rehabilitation work. The Gloucestershire Wildlife Trust purchased the site in 1981. The Forest of Dean District Council provided grant aid.

== History ==
The quarry was worked from the seventeenth century to the end of the nineteenth century at least. It is depicted on the OS map of 1889. It produced burning-lime and there is an old kiln standing at the southern end of the reserve. Classic exposures of Silurian Wenlock limestone were left once quarrying ceased. The series of algal and coral reefs have major visual impact and are called 'ballstones' because they have a circular cross-section. Drapes of bedded limestone overlay the reefs and were formed about 400 million years ago when the region was under warm seas. The rocks contain a diversity of fossils, referred to in scientific publications from the mid-nineteenth century. The fossils include corals, brachipods, trilobites and crinoids. This is an important educational location for geology students.

Lime was used for improve Dean soils which are acid, and for making mortar. When limestone was burned using a kiln, dangerous quicklime is produced. This slaked with water makes hydrated lime which can be transported safely.

== Trees and plants ==
When the site was no longer a working quarry its floor and walls were soon colonised by a mass of the more common species such as ash, bramble and wild clematis (known as old man's beard). The damp walls support moss and hart's-tongue fern.

The presence of small-leaved lime indicates that the quarry was once part of the adjoining Coleman's Wood which is ancient woodland. Traditionally the limes were coppiced. There is pedunculate oak, silver birch and field maple, and shrubs such as hazel, goat willow, dogwood and hawthorn.

The upper edges of the reserve were not quarried and the area supports ancient woodland flowers such as wood anemone, wood sorrel, primrose, sweet woodruff, greater butterfly-orchid, herb paris and bluebell.

== Birds, mammals and invertebrates ==
Reported bird sightings include blackcap, treecreeper, nuthatch, and long-tailed tit. Buzzards and ravens are seen and heard. The common dormouse may be found. The sheltered site is ideal for butterflies.

== Conservation ==
The area supporting the most impressive exposures and the floor are maintained free of scrub. The banks are managed to provide good views from pathways and to encourage the spring flowers.

== Publications ==
- Kelham, A, Sanderson, J, Doe, J, Edgeley-Smith, M, et al., 1979, 1990, 2002 editions, 'Nature Reserves of the Gloucestershire Trust for Nature Conservation/Gloucestershire Wildlife Trust'
- 'Hobbs Quarry Nature Reserve – Beautiful woodland walk among Silurian coral reefs', (undated), Gloucestershire Wildlife Trust
- 'Where to see Wildlife in the Forest of Dean', January 2012, Gloucestershire Wildlife Trust

== SSSI source ==
- Natural England SSSI information on the citation
- Natural England SSSI information on the unit
