= List of Sites of Special Scientific Interest in Gloucestershire =

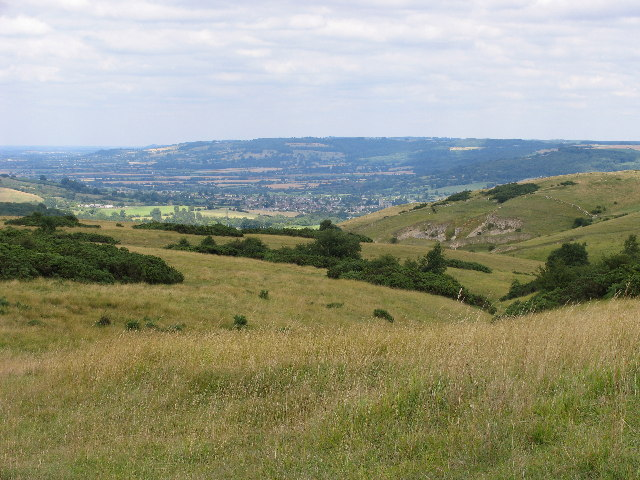
Cleeve Common is designated a biological and geological site

This is a list of the Sites of Special Scientific Interest (SSSIs) in Gloucestershire. Natural England, the designating body for SSSIs in England, uses the 1974-1996 county system, and this list follows the same approach. Some sites you may expect to find here could therefore be in the Avon list. It may also be that a site may on the borders of more than one county. It may also be on the country borders.

Natural England chooses a site because of its fauna, flora, geological or physiographical features. As of 2012, there are 121 sites designated in this Area of Search, of which 69 have been designated due to their biological interest, 32 due to their geological interest, and 20 for both.

Gloucestershire has 3 Areas of Outstanding Natural Beauty being the Cotswolds, Malvern Hills, and the Wye Valley (the latter is also partly in Wales). These areas may include several SSSIs, or be named an SSSI as is the case for the Malvern Hills.

Gloucestershire has 2 designated Ramsar sites being the Severn Estuary and Walmore Common both SSSIs. These two sites are also designated as Special Protection Areas (SPA) under the EC Directive on the conservation of Wild Birds.

Gloucestershire has 7 recognised Special Areas of Conservation (SAC), several of which bring together more than one SSSI. These are: Cotswold Beechwoods; Dixton Wood; River Wye/ Afon Gwy; Rodborough Common; Severn Estuary; Wye Valley and Forest of Dean Bat Sites/ Safleoedd Ystlumod Dyffryn Gwy a Fforest y Ddena; Wye Valley Woodlands/ Coetiroedd Dyffryn Gwy.

Highbury Wood SSSI and the Cotswold Commons and Beechwoods SSSI are national nature reserves (NNR). Lady Park Wood (part of the wood is in Gloucestershire and part in Monmouthshire) is a national nature reserve.

A significant number of the SSSIs are recognised by the relevant local authorities as Key Wildlife Sites and Regionally Important Geological/Geomorphological Sites. There are c. 800 recognised Key Wildlife Sites in Gloucestershire.

For other counties, see List of SSSIs by Area of Search.

== Sites ==
Site name	Reason for designation		Area^{[A]}		Grid reference^{[B]}	Year in which notified	Map^{[C]}
Site name	Biological interest	Geological interest	Hectares	Acres	Grid reference^{[B]}	Year in which notified	Map^{[C]}
Alderton Hill Quarry		✓	0.3	0.8	SP006345	1997	Map
Ashleworth Ham	✓		104.7	258.8	SO833263	1974	Map
Astridge Wood	✓		5.7	14.0	SO547088	1998	Map
Badgeworth	✓		3.1	7.6	SO911206	1954	Map
Barnsley Warren	✓		61.3	151.0	SP055064	1954	Map
Barton Bushes	✓		5.7	14.0	SP110259	1996	Map
Bigsweir Woods	✓		48.2	119.0	SO546060	1984	Map
Blaisdon Hall	✓		0.1	0.8	SO698170	1995	Map
Bourton Down	✓		11.2	27.6	SP142313	1974	Map
Box Farm Meadows	✓		8.3	21.0	ST865997	1985	Map
Boxwell	✓		5.3	13.2	ST816928	1954	Map
Brassey Reserve And Windrush Valley	✓		2.1	5.2	SP139223	1954	Map
Brooks Head Grove	✓		11.9	29.4	SO586145	1986	Map
Buckshraft Mine & Bradley Hill Railway Tunnel	✓		5.7	14.0	SO655123	1998	Map
Bull Cross, The Frith And Juniper Hill	✓	✓	42.3	104.6	SO872083	1954	Map
Bushley Muzzard, Brimpsfield	✓		1.1	2.8	SO944133	1984	Map
Caerwood And Ashberry Goose House	✓		0.1	0.3	ST54719655& ST54649657	1991	Map
Campden Tunnel Gravel Pit		✓	0.2	0.5	SP161408	1988	Map
Chaceley Meadow	✓		1.8	4.4	SO857306	1954	Map
Clarke's Pool Meadow	✓		1.8	4.4	SO668061	1954	Map
Cleeve Common	✓	✓	455.0	1,124.3	SO990260	1974	Map
Coaley Wood Quarries		✓	4.9	12.0	ST786996	1974	Map
Cockleford Marsh	✓		3.2	8.0	SO977133	1991	Map
Collinpark Wood	✓		66.7	164.8	SO750278	1966	Map
Coombe Hill	✓		15.4	38.1	ST765942	1994	Map
Coombe Hill Canal	✓		20.2	49.8	SO887272	1954	Map
Cotswold Commons And Beechwoods	✓		665.5	1,664.4	SO900130	1954	Map
Cotswold Water Park	✓		135.0	330.0	SU0093 – SU2099	1994	Map
Crickley Hill And Barrow Wake	✓	✓	56.8	140.3	SO929161	1974	Map
Daneway Banks	✓		17.0	42.0	SO937034	1954	Map
Dean Hall Coach House & Cellar	✓		0.1	0.1	SO672130	1988	Map
Devil's Chapel Scowles	✓		44.8	110.9	SO606045	1998	Map
Dingle Wood	✓		10.0	24.6	SO562115	1972	Map
Dixton Wood	✓		13.0	32.5	SO979313	2000	Map
Dymock Woods	✓		53.0	130.0	SO684288	1990	Map
Easter Park Farm Quarry		✓	0.2	0.4	SO810009	1986	Map
Edge Common	✓		20.5	50.6	SO847092	1974	Map
Edgehills Quarry		✓	0.4	1.0	SO660167	1974	Map
Elmlea Meadows	✓		6.9	17.1	SU079948	1989	Map
Foss Cross Quarry		✓	0.7	1.7	SP056092	1972	Map
Frampton Pools	✓		59.9	147.9	SO753073	1974	Map
Garden Cliff		✓	5.1	12.6	SO718128	1954	Map
Hampen Railway Cutting		✓	3.9	9.6	SP062205	1974	Map
Haresfield Beacon		✓	0.7	1.8	SO819088	1985	Map
Harford Railway Cutting		✓	1.2	3.0	SP135218	1974	Map
Highbury Wood	✓		50.7	123.4	SO540086	1983	Map
Hobb's Quarry, Longhope	✓	✓	1.0	2.5	SO695195	1966	Map
Hornsleasow Quarry		✓	3.5	9.6	SP131322	1974	Map
Hornsleasow Roughs	✓		28.2	69.8	SP117323	1954	Map
Hucclecote Meadows	✓		5.7	14.2	SO872163	1984	Map
Huntsman's Quarry		✓	1.6	4.0	SP125259	1974	Map
Innsworth Meadow	✓		2.2	5.4	SO851216	1979	Map
Jackdaw Quarry		✓	4.8	11.8	SP077309	1985	Map
Juniper Hill, Edgeworth	✓		11.3	27.8	SO928058 & SO928064	1974	Map
Kemble Railway Cuttings		✓	2.7	6.7	ST975976 & ST985973 & ST982989	1996	Map
Kempley Daffodil Meadow	✓		1.2	3.0	SO676301	1986	Map
Kingscote And Horsley Woods	✓		43.8	108.2	ST831971	1966	Map
Knap House Quarry, Birdlip		✓	1.8	4.4	SO925147	1974	Map
Land Grove Quarry, Mitcheldean		✓	3.8	9.4	SO672185	1974	Map
Lark Wood	✓		1.1	2.8	SP104262	1974	Map
Leckhampton Hill And Charlton Kings Common	✓	✓	63.8	157.7	SO952187	1954	Map
Lineover Wood	✓		20.3	50.2	SO987187	1986	Map
Longhope Hill		✓	0.2	0.5	SO693185	1989	Map
Lower Wye Gorge	✓	✓	65.0	160.0	ST548983 & ST537967	1954	Map
Lydney Cliff		✓	8.0	19.7	SO654020	1990	Map
May Hill	✓	✓	32.6	80.6	SO695214	1954	Map
Meezy Hurst		✓	4.3	10.6	SO638089	1986	Map
Minchinhampton Common	✓	✓	182.7	451.4	SO855010	1972	Map
Nagshead	✓		120.1	316.6	SO608090	1972	Map
New Park Quarry		✓	1.3	3.2	SP175282	1987	Map
Nibley Knoll		✓	3.2	7.9	ST744956	1974	Map
Notgrove Railway Cutting		✓	1.7	4.2	SP086209	1974	Map
Oakenhill Railway Cutting		✓	0.8	2.0	SO630069	1985	Map
Old Bow And Old Ham Mines	✓		40.3	99.6	SO579088	1998	Map
Old River Severn, Upper Lode	✓		3.7	9.2	SO880331	1985	Map
Pennsylvania Fields, Sedbury	✓		27.0	66.8	ST542929	1985	Map
Poor's Allotment	✓		28.6	70.6	ST560990	1954	Map
Puckham Woods	✓		32.4	80.0	SP010224	1954	Map
Puddlebrook Quarry		✓	0.7	1.9	SO646183	1986	Map
Purton Passage		✓	4.9	12.1	SO687045	1966	Map
Range Farm Fields	✓		12.8	31.6	SO850130	1996	Map
River Wye	✓	✓	England: 1,159.6 Wales: 245.2 Total: 1,404.8	England: 2,865.0 Wales: 606.0 Total: 3,471.0	ST544912 – SO230429	1978	Map
Robin's Wood Hill Quarry		✓	1.7	4.1	SO836148	1966	Map
Rodborough Common	✓	✓	116	287	SO851035	1954	Map
Rough Bank, Miserden	✓		9.2	22.7	SO907087	1986	Map
Salmonsbury Meadows	✓	✓	18.0	44.0	SP178213	1985	Map
Scully Grove Quarry		✓	0.4	1.0	SO657186	1974	Map
Selsley Common	✓	✓	39.4	97.4	SO829030	1966	Map
Severn Estuary	✓	✓	15,950.0	39,410.0	ST480830	1976	Map
Severn Ham, Tewkesbury	✓		70.8	175.0	SO885325	1974	Map
Shorn Cliff And Caswell Woods	✓		69.2	171.0	SO540005 & SO540990	1986	Map
Slade Brook	✓	✓	3.6	8.9	SO564055	2003	Map
Soudley Ponds	✓		7.0	17.4	SO662112	1984	Map
Speech House Oaks	✓		16.3	40.2	SO622123	1972	Map
Stenders Quarry	✓	✓	2.8	6.9	SO659183	1966	Map
Stinchcombe Hill	✓		28.6	70.7	ST740983	1966	Map
Stony Furlong Railway Cutting		✓	2.7	6.7	SP063106	1987	Map
Strawberry Banks	✓		5.1	12.5	SO910033	1993	Map
Swanpool Wood And Furnace Grove	✓		13.6	33.6	SO541107	1984	Map
Swift's Hill	✓	✓	9.2	22.6	SO877067	1966	Map
Sylvan House Barn	✓		<0.1	0.1	SO534023	1995	Map
The Hudnalls	✓		94.4	233.3	SO533030 & SO540042 & SO545046	1972	Map
The Malvern Hills	✓	✓	732.3	1,899.6	SO766472 – SO758350	1954	Map
Tudor Farm Bank	✓		3.7	9.1	SO573081	1999	Map
Turvey's Piece	✓		1.0	2.5	SO882301	1993	Map
Upham Meadow And Summer Leasow	✓		104.0	257.0	SO917375	1991	Map
Upper Severn Estuary	✓	✓	1,436.8	3,550.4	SO720060	1954	Map
Upper Wye Gorge	✓	✓	245.1	605.7	SO560155	1969	Map
Veizey's Quarry		✓	1.4	3.5	ST881944	1974	Map
Wainlode Cliff		✓	1.3	3.2	SO845257	1954	Map
Walmore Common	✓		57.8	142.8	SO740162 & SO745150	1955	Map
Wellacre Quarry		✓	12.3	30.4	SP180370	1974	Map
Westbury Brook Ironstone Mine	✓		15.7	38.8	SO662166	1998	Map
Whelford Meadow	✓		1.9	4.6	SP168000	1985	Map
Wigpool Ironstone Mine	✓		34.9	95.0	SO654197	1998	Map
Wildmoorway Meadows	✓		12.6	31.1	SU066973	1989	Map
Winson Meadows	✓		7.9	19.6	SP093081	1974	Map
Wood Green Quarry & Railway Cutting		✓	0.3	0.7	SO694166	1966	Map
Woodchester Park	✓		214.9	531.0	SO820014	1966	Map
Wotton Hill	✓	✓	26.1	64.0	ST753942	1954	Map
Yarley Meadows	✓		12.2	30.2	ST757888	1987	Map

== See also ==
- Gloucestershire Wildlife Trust
- Wildfowl and Wetlands Trust
- Royal Society for the Protection of Birds
- Woodland Trust
- Forestry Commission

== Notes ==
^{A} Data rounded to one decimal place.
^{B} Grid reference is based on the British national grid reference system, also known as OSGB36, and is the system used by the Ordnance Survey.
^{C} Link to maps using the Nature on the Map service provided by Natural England.
