= Blockley (disambiguation) =

Blockley may refer to:

== Places ==
- Blockley, Gloucestershire (Worcestershire until 1931), England
  - Blockley Station Brickworks Site of Special Scientific Interest
- Blockley Township, Pennsylvania, United States
  - Blockley Almshouse, charity hospital and poorhouse, West Philadelphia
  - Blockley Hall, Perelman School of Medicine. Philadelphia

== People ==
- Jeff Blockley (born 1949), English footballer
- Nathan Blockley (born 1992), Scottish footballer
