= Jackdaw (disambiguation) =

A jackdaw is a bird in the crow family in the genus Coloeus.

Jackdaw or jackdaws may also refer to:

== Birds ==
- Western jackdaw (Coloeus monedula), often referred to as "the jackdaw"

== Arts and entertainment ==
- Jackdaw (band), a Celtic rock group from New York state
- The Jackdaw, a British art magazine
- Jackdaws (novel), a spy thriller by Ken Follett
- Jackdaw Publications, acquired by Rosen Publishing
- Jackdaw (film), a 2023 British action thriller film

=== Fictional characters and elements ===
- Jackdaw (Marvel Comics), Captain Britain's sidekick
- Blackbird (Femizon), a Marvel Comics antagonist (formerly Jackdaw)
- Jackdaw, a ship in the Assassin's Creed IV: Black Flag video game

== Ships ==
- HMS Jackdaw, a list of ships with this name
- USS Jackdaw, a list of ships with this name

== See also ==
- Jack Daws (born 1970), American artist
- Jackdaw Cake, an autobiography by Norman Lewis
- "Jackdaw of Rheims", a poem in The Ingoldsby Legends
- Jackdaw Quarry, a geologic site in Gloucestershire, England
- Jackdaw gas field in the UK sector of the North Sea
