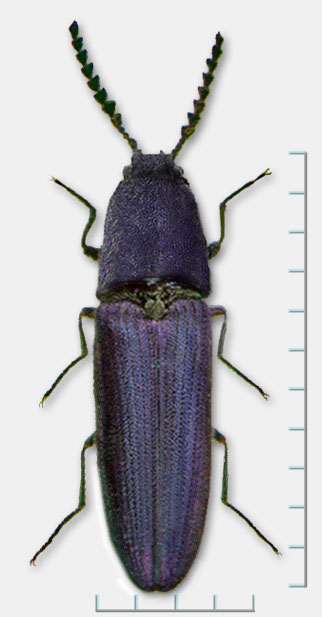

Conservation status
- Vulnerable (IUCN 3.1)

Scientific classification
- Kingdom: Animalia
- Phylum: Arthropoda
- Clade: Pancrustacea
- Class: Insecta
- Order: Coleoptera
- Suborder: Polyphaga
- Infraorder: Elateriformia
- Family: Elateridae
- Genus: Gambrinus
- Species: G. violaceus

Binomial name
- Gambrinus violaceus (Müller, 1821)

= Violet click beetle =

Species of beetle

The violet click beetle (Gambrinus violaceus, formerly Limoniscus violaceus) is a black beetle, 12 mm (0.5 in) long, with a faint blue/violet reflection. It gets its name from the family habit of springing upwards with an audible click if it falls on its back. It occurs in Europe.

== Description ==
The adult beetle is long and slender, about 12 mm (0.5 in) long, with many small puncture marks on its pronotum, and longitudinal striations on its elytra. The pronotum is greyish-black and the elytra are black with a purplish iridescence. The larvae are whitish and resemble mealworm grubs.

== Ecology ==
This sapro-xylophagous beetle is found only in the heart of decayed ancient trees, specifically in undisturbed wood-mould at the base of central cavities: in Britain it has been found only in beech and ash trees. Its very specific habitat requirements mean that the beetle is very rare, and even at the three sites where it has been found, there are few suitable trees, and their number is declining. One of the host trees at Windsor blew down in the Great Storm of 1987, but was re-erected solely as a host for the violet click beetle. English Nature's conservation efforts continue in an effort to create more suitable trees, including by erecting more decaying trees, and artificially ageing some others. Windsor Forest is considered to be the most important site in Britain for invertebrates associated with the decaying timber of ancient trees. In Hungary, the larvae occupy cavities filled with wood mould near the base of hollow Turkey oaks (Quercus cerris), but also in similar cavities in lime (Tilia), ash (Fraxinus) and maple (Acer) trees.

== Conservation status ==
The International Union for Conservation of Nature has assessed the conservation status of the beetle as Endangered.

The beetle is listed in Annex II of the EC Habitats Directive and Schedule 5 of the UK's Wildlife and Countryside Act 1981. It is also listed as Endangered in the GB Red List. It is to be found in only a few locations in Europe, including three sites in Britain. These are Windsor Forest (where it was first found in 1937), Bredon Hill in Worcestershire (1989), and Dixton Wood SSSI in Gloucestershire (1998). The violet click beetle is one of the species that the Back from the Brink project aims to save from extinction in Britain.
