= Stenders Quarry =

Protected area in Gloucestershire, England

Stenders Quarry SSSI
- Site of Special Scientific Interest
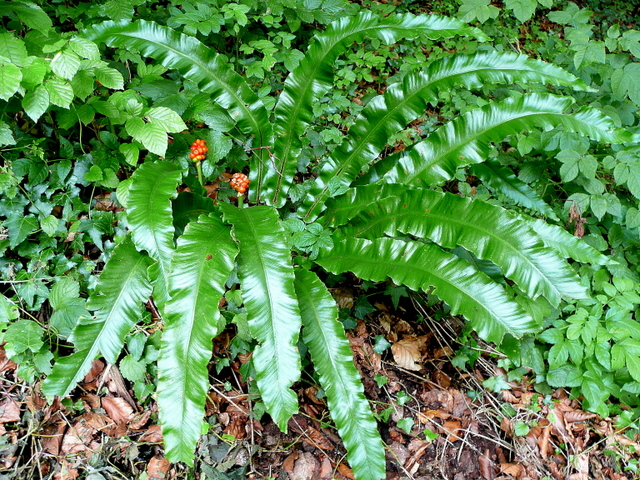
- Example - hart's-tongue fern growing in the Forest of Dean

- Location within Gloucestershire
- Location of Stenders Quarry SSSI.
- Area of search: Gloucestershire
- Grid reference: SO659183
- Coordinates: 51.86269°N 2.49587°W
- Interest: Biological/Geological
- Area: 2.8 ha (6.9 acres)
- Notification date: 1966

Stenders Quarry (grid reference SO659183) is a 2.8-hectare (6.9-acre) biological and geological Site of Special Scientific Interest in the Forest of Dean, Gloucestershire, England, notified in 1966 and renotified in 1990. The site is designated as an SSSI for its important geological features, although there is also a diversity of plants and animals recorded.

The site is listed in the 'Forest of Dean Local Plan Review' as a Key Wildlife Site (KWS).

Stenders Quarry is situated west of Mitcheldean and is on the south side of the Drybrook road. The site was known formerly as the Wilderness Cement Work Quarry. The Quarry, which was gradually extended during the second half of the nineteenth century, provided material for the cement works. Scully Grove Quarry SSSI which is situated to the north also provided material for the cement works.. The remains of an overhead tramway, which was built to carry the limestone across the road, can be seen on the eastern side of Stenders Quarry. Working stopped in 1918 and the Quarry became derelict. The site is regularly used by geological students.

The site is owned and managed by the Gloucestershire Wildlife Trust. It was purchased in 1974.

== The site ==
The dip of the quarry is steep and shows a wide range of rock types. There are exposures of fossiliferous Lower Carboniferous limestone shales. Their junctions with the Old Red Sandstone and with part of the Lower Dolomite formation are visible. There are fossils in the rocks such as sea lilies, water fleas and shellfish.

== Plants, trees and shrubs ==
The shallow limestone soils have been colonised by a diversity of plants. These include kidney vetch, cowslip, yellow-wort, ploughman's-spikenard (Inula conyza), large thyme (Thymus pulegioides), blue fleabane and the common spotted-orchid. Autumn gentian blooms in the late summer. Ferns such as black spleenwort, wall-rue and hart's-tongue grow amongst the boulders. ferns such as lady-fern and polypody are spread throughout the reserve. There is a rich variety of mosses and liverworts present.

Part of the site is covered by wild cherry, pedunculate oak, ash, dogwood, hawthorn, grey willow and dog-rose.

== Birds and other species ==
Great spotted woodpecker, goldcrest and numerous scrub-loving birds may be seen on the reserve. The site is sheltered and relatively sunny and such conditions encourage various grassland butterflies, notably the marbled white. The site hosts various species of snails.

== Conservation ==
Regular scrub clearance is undertaken to maintain the grassy banks and rock exposures.

== Publications ==
- Kelham, A, Sanderson, J, Doe, J, Edgeley-Smith, M, et al, 1979, 1990, 2002 editions, 'Nature Reserves of the Gloucestershire Trust for Nature Conservation/Gloucestershire Wildlife Trust'
- 'Where to see Wildlife in the Forest of Dean', January 2012, Gloucestershire Wildlife Trust

== SSSI Source ==
- Natural England SSSI information on the citation
- Natural England SSSI information on the Stenders Quarry units
