= Astridge Wood =

Biological Site of Special Scientific Interest in Gloucestershire, England

- Site of Special Scientific Interest
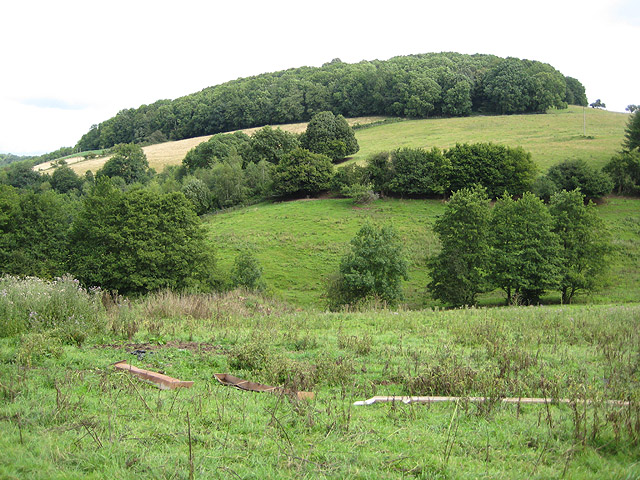
- Astridge Wood

- Location within Gloucestershire
- Location of Astridge Wood.
- Area of search: Gloucestershire
- Grid reference: SO547088
- Coordinates: 51.776478°N 2.65726°W
- Interest: Biological
- Area: 19.42 ha (48.0 acres)
- Notification date: 1985

Astridge Wood (grid reference SO547088) is a 19.42-hectare (48.0-acre) biological Site of Special Scientific Interest in Gloucestershire, England, notified in 1985. The site is listed in the 'Forest of Dean Local Plan Review' as a Key Wildlife Site (KWS).

The site is in the Wye Valley Area of Outstanding Natural Beauty. It is to the east (see map) of Highbury Wood National Nature Reserve (NNR).

Wye Valley Woodlands/ Coetiroedd Dyffryn Gwy are recognised as a Special Area of Conservation (SAC) under the EU Habitats Directive.

== Habitat and flora ==
The site is part of one of the most important areas for woodland conservation in the United Kingdom, as the woods are semi-natural, and there is a continuity along the Lower Wye Gorge (which is also notified as an SSSI). The tree species comprise many different types and the area supports many rare and local species. The individual woods are part of a matrix of various habitats (semi natural and unimproved grassland).

The wood is mainly on Carboniferous Limestone and has Old Red Sandstone on the lower slopes. It is considered one of the finest examples of rich calceaous mixed coppice in the area. Trees include Ash, Small-leaved Lime with scattered Alder, Sessile Oak and Field Maple. The woodland is managed coppice.

The ground flora includes Dog's Mercury, Bramble and Hart's-tongue Fern. Rarities include Broad-leaved Helleborine, Spurge Laurel and some Wild Daffodil. There are various varieties of mosses and liverworts recorded.

== SSSI Source ==
- Natural England SSSI information on the citation
- Natural England SSSI information on the Astridge Wood unit
