= Rough Bank, Miserden =

Protected area in Gloucestershire, England

- Site of Special Scientific Interest
- Location within Gloucestershire
- Location of Rough Bank, Miserden.
- Area of search: Gloucestershire
- Grid reference: SO907087
- Coordinates: 51.77734°N 2.135474°W
- Interest: Biological
- Area: 9.2 ha (23 acres)
- Notification date: 1986

Rough Bank, Miserden (grid reference SO907087) is a 9.2-hectare (23-acre) biological Site of Special Scientific Interest in Gloucestershire, notified in 1986. It was purchased by the wildlife charity Butterfly Conservation in 2012.

== Habitat and flora ==
The site lies in the Cotswold Area of Outstanding Natural Beauty near Miserden and is one of several sites of ancient herb-rich pasture that remain in the area. It lies on Jurassic limestone.

The grassland includes upright brome, tor-grass, sheep's fescue and a range of plants that flourish on calcareous soils. These include autumn gentian, clustered bellflower, common calamint, ploughman's spikenard and rock rose. There are large quantities of kidney vetch on the site and horseshoe vetch is also present. A wide range of orchids flourish including fly orchid, bee orchid, green-winged orchid, fragrant orchid, early purple orchid, autumn lady's tresses, pyramidal orchid and lesser and greater butterfly orchid.

Woodland and scrub areas support such plants as broad-leaved helleborine, white helleborine and nettle-leaved bellflower. Columbine is recorded.

The reserve is biologically rich – the main area of flower-rich grassland is a Site of Special Scientific Interest (SSSI) and is home to 33 species of butterfly, 42 species of nationally scarce and rare moths and 12 species of orchid.

The Rough Bank site was purchased by Butterfly Conservation in 2012 with the help of a significant grant from Natural England, funding from The Gloucestershire Naturalists Society and donations from individual supporters. It has become part of the Cotswold Commons and Beechwoods National Nature Reserve (NNR) and is managed in collaboration with Natural England and the National Trust.

== Fauna ==
The rich flora support a diverse range of invertebrates, and butterflies include chalkhill blue, small blue, green hairstreak and the marbled white. There are species of snail, ant and woodlouse recorded and there are old ant hills present.
