= Knap House Quarry, Birdlip =

Site of Special Scientific Interest in Gloucestershire

- Site of Special Scientific Interest
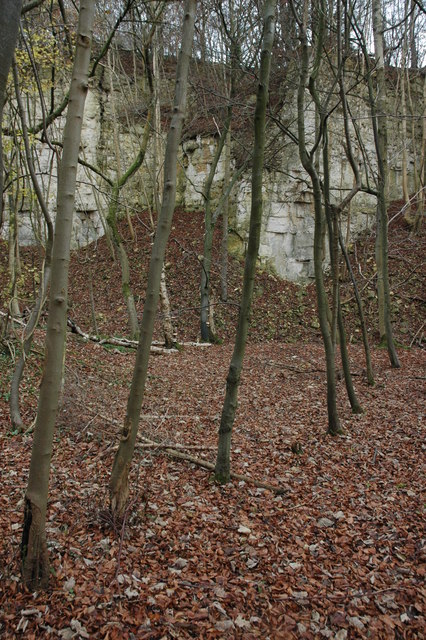
- Disused quarry, Birdlip Hill

- Location within Gloucestershire
- Location of Knap House Quarry, Birdlip.
- Area of search: Gloucestershire
- Grid reference: SO925147
- Coordinates: 51.831313°N 2.109516°W
- Interest: Geological
- Area: 1.80 ha (4.4 acres)
- Notification date: 1974

Knap House Quarry, Birdlip (grid reference SO925147) is a 1.80-hectare (4.4-acre) geological Site of Special Scientific Interest in Gloucestershire, notified in 1974. The site is listed in the 'Cotswold District' Local Plan 2001-2011 (on line) as a Key Wildlife Site (KWS) and a Regionally Important Geological Site (RIGS).

== Location and geology ==
The quarry is in the Cotswold Area of Outstanding Natural Beauty and was formerly notified as Birdlip Quarry. It is 400 m north of Birdlip, and about 8 km south-west of Gloucester City. It lies within woodland and is now disused. The Cotswold Commons and Beechwoods notified Site of Scientific Interest lies to the south-west.

The exposures are of Middle Jurassic sediments of the Aalenian and Bajocian Stages, and are nationally important for research of the period in the United Kingdom. The strata are Lower Inferior Oolite which is overlain with Upper Trigonia Grit. There are no Middle Inferior Oolite strata present. This is as a consequence of a period of uplift and warping of the crust. This site is a significant example of the effects of this tectonic occurrence.

== SSSI Source ==
- Natural England SSSI information on the citation
- Natural England SSSI information on the Knap House Quarry, Birdlip unit
