= Cockleford Marsh =

Biological Site of Special Scientific Interest in Gloucestershire, England

- Site of Special Scientific Interest
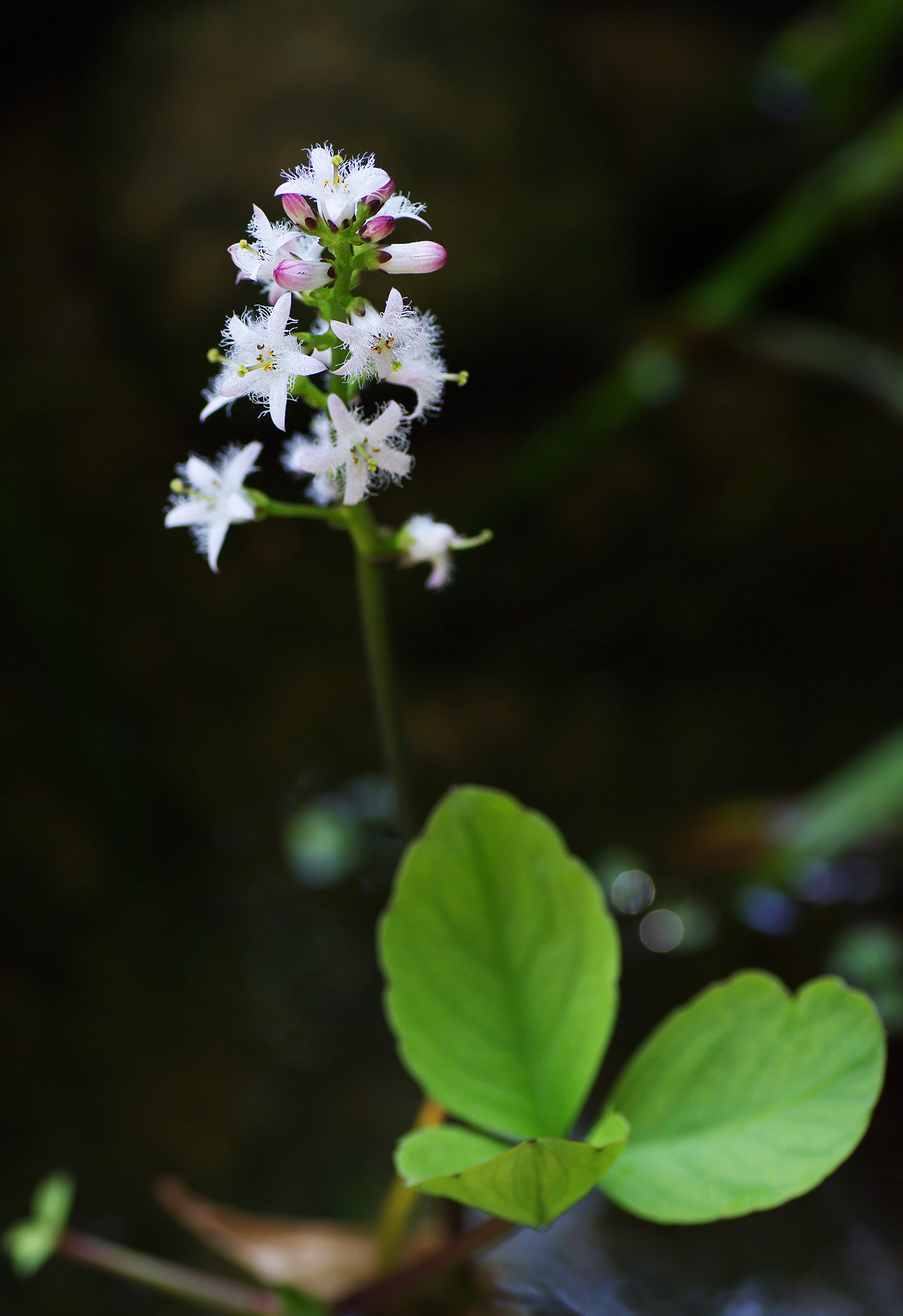
- Example - Bogbean (Menyanthes trifoliata)
- Location of Cockleford Marsh.
- Area of search: Gloucestershire
- Grid reference: SO977133
- Coordinates: 51.818772°N 2.034046°W
- Interest: Biological
- Area: 3.2 ha (7.9 acres)
- Notification date: 1991

Cockleford Marsh (grid reference SO977133) is a 3.2-hectare (7.9-acre) biological Site of Special Scientific Interest in Gloucestershire, notified in 1991.

It lies in the Cotswold Area of Outstanding Natural Beauty. The site is a typical example of the spring line fen-meadow habitat which is common along the Cotswold scarp and the valleys in areas of landslip. There are only a few remaining such marshes in the Cotswolds. This site is particularly botanically rich and a mixture of grassland and wetland habitats.

The site is listed in the 'Cotswold District' Local Plan 2001-2011 (on line) as a Key Wildlife Site (KWS).

== Flora ==
The fen-meadow is dominated by Hard Rush, Creeping Bent and Brooklime. Locally scarce (Gloucestershire) species occur such as Bogbean, Common Cottongrass, Marsh Arrowgrass, Southern Marsh Orchid, Star Sedge and other particular sedges. A significant number of Common Spotted Orchids are recorded, along with Marsh Marigold, Ragged Robin and Marsh Valerian.

The unimproved grassland consists of two main types. There is short grazed limestone grassland and taller neutral grassland. The former is herb rich. These include Devil's bit Scabious, Burnet Saxifrage, Mouse-ear Hawkweed and Lady's Bedstraw.

== SSSI Source ==
- Natural England SSSI information on the citation
- Natural England SSSI information on the Cockleford Marsh unit
