= Bourton Down =

Protected area in Gloucestershire, England

- Site of Special Scientific Interest
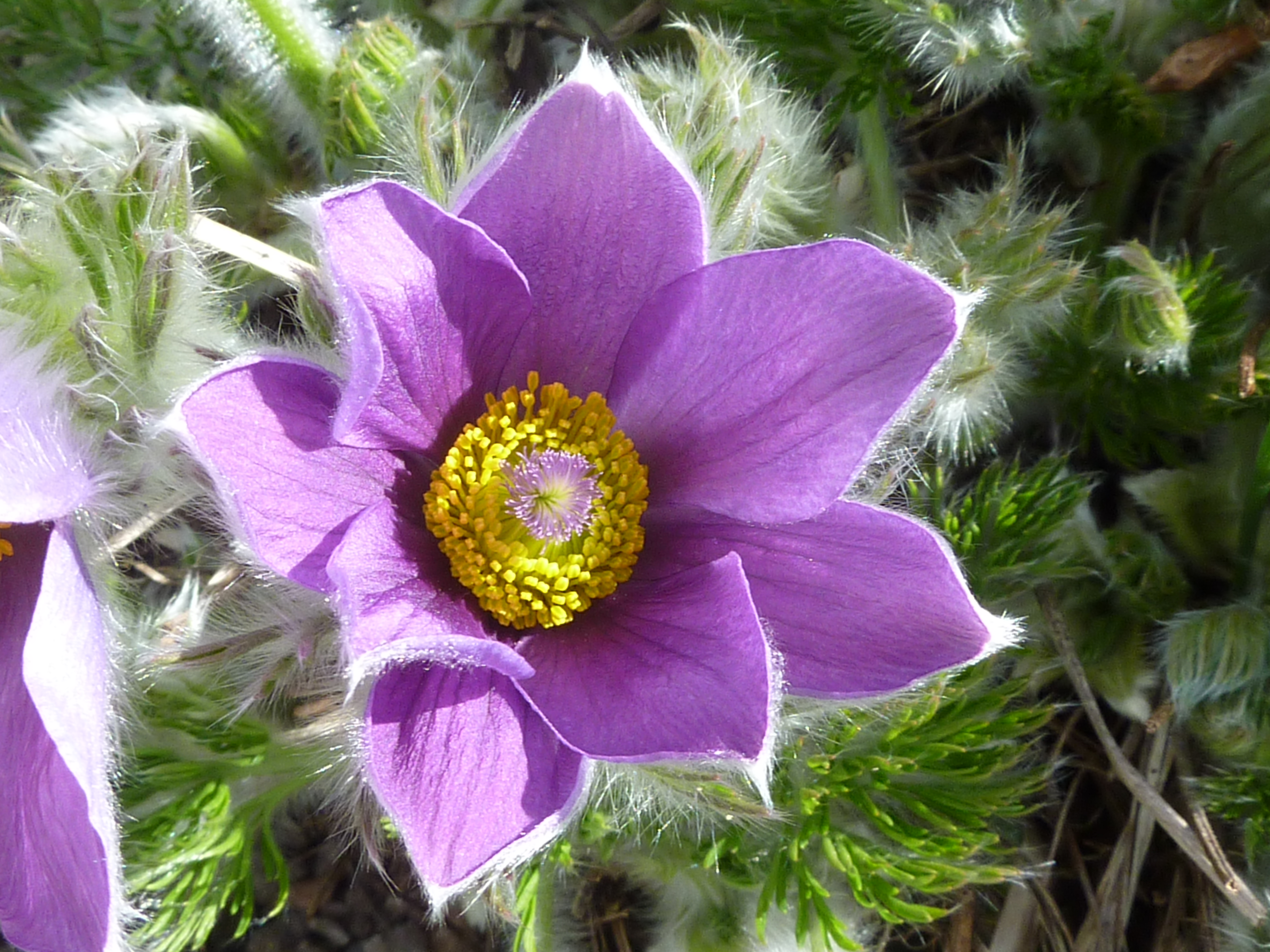
- Pasqueflower (Pulsatilla vulgaris)
- Location of Bourton Down.
- Area of search: Gloucestershire
- Grid reference: SP142313
- Coordinates: 51.980432°N 1.793933°W
- Interest: Biological
- Area: 11.17 ha (27.6 acres)
- Notification date: 1974

Bourton Down (grid reference SP142313) is an 11.17-hectare (27.6-acre) biological Site of Special Scientific Interest near Bourton-on-the-Hill in Gloucestershire, notified in 1974. The site is listed in the 'Cotswold District' Local Plan 2001–2011 (on line) as a Key Wildlife Site (KWS).

== Location and habitat ==
The site lies within the Cotswold Area of Outstanding Natural Beauty and is one of a series of grassland sites on Jurassic limestone. The site supports the Pasqueflower which is of some importance as there are few remaining sites. The site also supports Bastard Toadflax, and has good populations of Early Purple Orchid and Bee Orchid.

== SSSI Source ==
- Natural England SSSI information on the citation
- Natural England SSSI information on the Bourton Down unit
