= Swanpool Wood and Furnace Grove =

Forest in England

Swanpool Wood and Furnance Grove
- Site of Special Scientific Interest
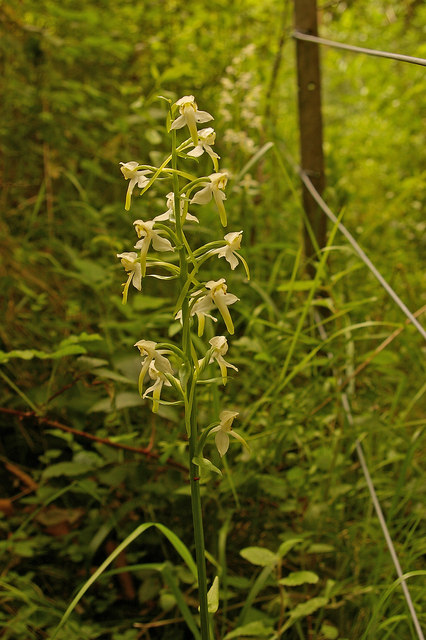
- Example: Greater Butterfly Orchid

- Location within Gloucestershire
- Location of Swanpool Wood and Furnance Grove.
- Area of search: Gloucestershire
- Grid reference: SO541107
- Coordinates: 51.793511°N 2.666208°W
- Interest: Biological
- Area: 13.59 ha (33.6 acres)
- Notification date: 1984

Swanpool Wood and Furnace Grove (grid reference SO541107) is a 13.59-hectare (33.6-acre) biological Site of Special Scientific Interest (a conservation designation denoting a protected area in the United Kingdom), in Gloucestershire in South West England. The site is listed in the 'Forest of Dean Local Plan Review' as a Key Wildlife Site (KWS).

== Location ==
It is in the Wye Valley Area of Outstanding Natural Beauty, an area of some importance in southern Great Britain, and supports many rare species. The woods and groves are important areas of woodland conservation work, coppicing and replanting. The semi-natural woodland is plentiful and continuous along the gorge. There are two separate SSSI designations for the gorge being Lower Wye Gorge and Upper Wye Gorge.

Wye Valley Woodlands/ Coetiroedd Dyffryn Gwy are recognised as a Special Area of Conservation (SAC) under the EU Habitats Directive.

== Flora ==
The site comprises a block of ancient broad-leaved woodland on Carboniferous limestone shales. There is an Old Red Sandstone outcrop to the west. There are various streams and flushes in the north-east of Swanpool Wood. The growth reflects the nature of the soils. The woodland is made up of Ash, Small-leaved Lime and Hazel. The damper areas support Alder.

Bramble, Dog's Mercury, Bluebell are prevalent in the ground flora together with ferns and ivy, Hart's-tongue and wavy hair-grass. Uncommon species include Herb Paris, Greater Butterfly Orchid and Narrow-leaved Bitter-cress.
