= New Park Quarry =

Site of Special Scientific Interest in Gloucestershire

- Site of Special Scientific Interest
- Location within Gloucestershire
- Location of New Park Quarry.
- Area of search: Gloucestershire
- Grid reference: SP175282
- Coordinates: 51.952467°N 1.746044°W
- Interest: Geological
- Area: 1.3 ha (3.2 acres)
- Notification date: 1987

New Park Quarry (grid reference SP175282) is a 1.3-hectare (3.2-acre) geological Site of Special Scientific Interest in Gloucestershire, notified in 1987. The site is listed in the 'Cotswold District' Local Plan 2001-2011 (on line) as a Regionally Important Geological Site (RIGS).

== Location and geology ==
This site is in the north Cotswolds, near Longborough, and contains the well-preserved remains (disarticulated) of Crocodiles and Dinosaurs. This fauna is in the Chipping Norton Formation and is considered to be the oldest assemblage of dinosaurs from the Jurassic time period in the United Kingdom. The site is of significant importance for research of the ecology and evolution of this species.

== SSSI Source ==
- Natural England SSSI information on the citation
- Natural England SSSI information on the New Park Quarry units
