= Hucclecote Meadows =

Protected area in Gloucestershire, England

- Site of Special Scientific Interest
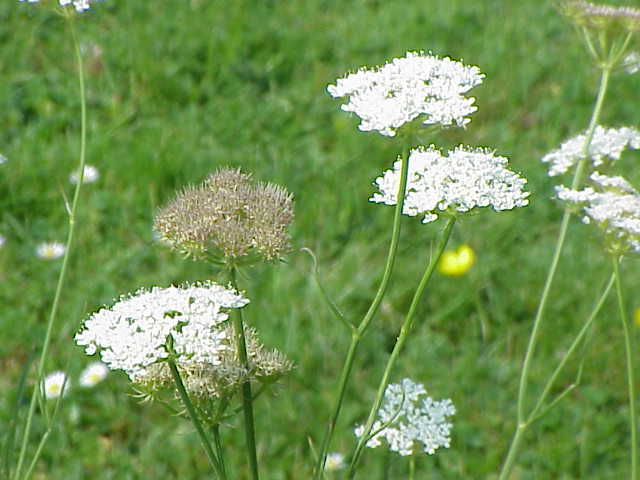
- Example - corky-fruited water dropwort (Oenanthe pimpinelloides)

- Location within Gloucestershire
- Location of Hucclecote Meadows.
- Area of search: Gloucestershire
- Grid reference: SO872163
- Coordinates: 51.845601°N 2.186486°W
- Interest: Biological
- Area: 5.74 ha (14.2 acres)
- Notification date: 1984

Hucclecote Meadows (grid reference SO872163) is a 5.74-hectare (14.2-acre) biological Site of Special Scientific Interest divided into two areas on each side of the M5 road in the Severn Vale, Gloucestershire. It was notified in 1984. The western area is also a Local Nature Reserve.

== Location and use ==
The site is on the outskirts of Gloucester City, and is made up of a series of lowland meadows overlying Lower Lias clays. They are one of the few remaining areas of herb rich ancient pastures in Gloucestershire. They have been traditionally managed for hay, and cattle and sheep grazing.

== Flora ==
The species are abundant with variations from one meadow to the next. At the time of citation the meadows were reported as supporting some 75 meadow species, including some rarities such as corky-fruited water dropwort. The main grasses found are Yorkshire fog, meadow fescue, crested dog's-tail and meadow foxtail. The general meadow species found include great burnet, cowslip, devil's-bit scabious, saw-wort, lady's bedstraw and yellow rattle.

The meadows are bordered by very old hedges of hawthorn and blackthorn, which include some hedgerow trees such as oak.

== Invertebrates ==
The range of butterflies recorded includes meadow brown, marbled white, common blue, grizzled skipper and the small heath butterfly.

== SSSI Source ==
- Natural England SSSI information on the citation
- Natural England SSSI information on the Hucclecote Meadows units
- "Hucclecote Meadows citation" (PDF). Sites of Special Scientific Interest. Natural England. Archived from the original (PDF) on 5 July 2014.
