= Kemble Railway Cuttings =

Geological Site of Special Scientific Interest in Gloucestershire, England

- Site of Special Scientific Interest
- Location within Gloucestershire
- Location of Kemble Railway Cuttings.
- Area of search: Gloucestershire
- Grid reference: ST975976 & ST985973 & ST982989
- Coordinates: 51.6749°N 2.0224°W
- Interest: Geological
- Area: 2.72 ha (6.7 acres)
- Notification date: 1996

Kemble Railway Cuttings (ST975976 & ST985973 & ST982989) is a 2.72-hectare (6.7-acre) geological Site of Special Scientific Interest in Gloucestershire, England, notified in 1996. The site is listed in the Cotswold District Local Plan 2001–2011 as a Regionally Important Geological Site (RIGS).

== Location and geology ==
The site is a Geological Conservation Review (GCR) site, which is of significant importance regionally (south-west of England) for research on the stratigraphy of Middle Jurassic (Bathonian) rocks. The rocks exhibit the type section of the Kemble Beds, and show good examples of basal Forest Marble coral patch reefs with inter-reef sediments. The site consists of three separate units.

The exposures provide a vital reference section for correlating the successions of the Cirencester, Minchinhampton and Bath areas of the country. In particular, the Bradford Fossil Bed at the former Tetbury Road railway station is of historical and biostratigraphical interest.

== SSSI Source ==
- Natural England SSSI information on the citation
- Natural England SSSI information on the Kemble Railway Cuttings units
