= Kingscote and Horsley Woods =

Protected area in Gloucestershire, England

- Site of Special Scientific Interest
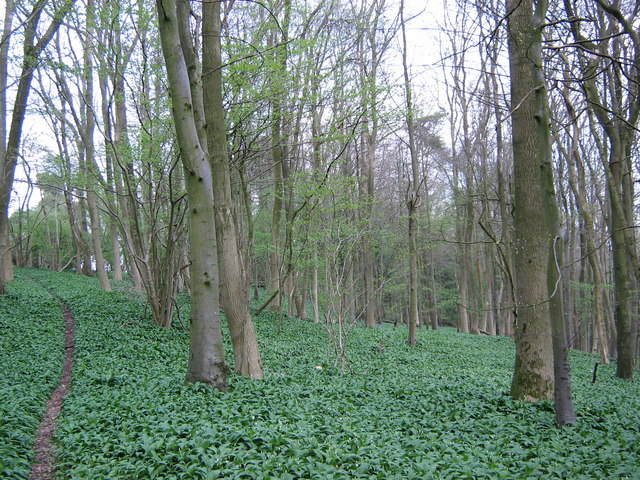
- Kingscote Wood with wild garlic ground flora

- Location within Gloucestershire
- Location of Kingscote and Horsley Woods.
- Area of search: Gloucestershire
- Grid reference: ST831971
- Coordinates: 51.672865°N 2.245065°W
- Interest: Biological
- Area: 43.79 ha (108.2 acres)
- Notification date: 1966

Kingscote and Horsley Woods (grid reference ST831971) is a 43.79-hectare (108.2-acre) biological Site of Special Scientific Interest in Gloucestershire, notified in 1966. The site (Kingscote Woods Complex, including Conygre Wood, Sandgrove Wood and Fishponds Wood) is listed in the 'Cotswold District' Local Plan 2001-2011 (on line) as a Key Wildlife Site (KWS).

== Location ==
The woods are in the Cotswold Area of Outstanding Natural Beauty and there are two units of assessment. There are four separately named woods in the citation being Kingscote, Horsley, Sandgrove and Fishponds.

== Woodland type ==
The site is an example of ancient Beech woodland, which is typical of the Jurassic limestone of the west Cotswolds. Kingscote, Horsley and Sandgrove woods are similar and includes some Ash and Oak. The woodland understorey is Hazel and Hawthorn. These are Bluebell woods with Wood Garlic, Wood Anemone and Dog's Mercury.

Fishponds Wood, as its names implies, includes a pond area, and is a regenerated woodland, having been previously felled. Ground flora includes Small Teasel.

== SSSI Source ==
- Natural England SSSI information on the citation
- Natural England SSSI information on the Kingscote and Horsley Wood units
