= Juniper Hill, Edgeworth =

Biological Site of Special Scientific Interest in Gloucestershire, England

- Site of Special Scientific Interest
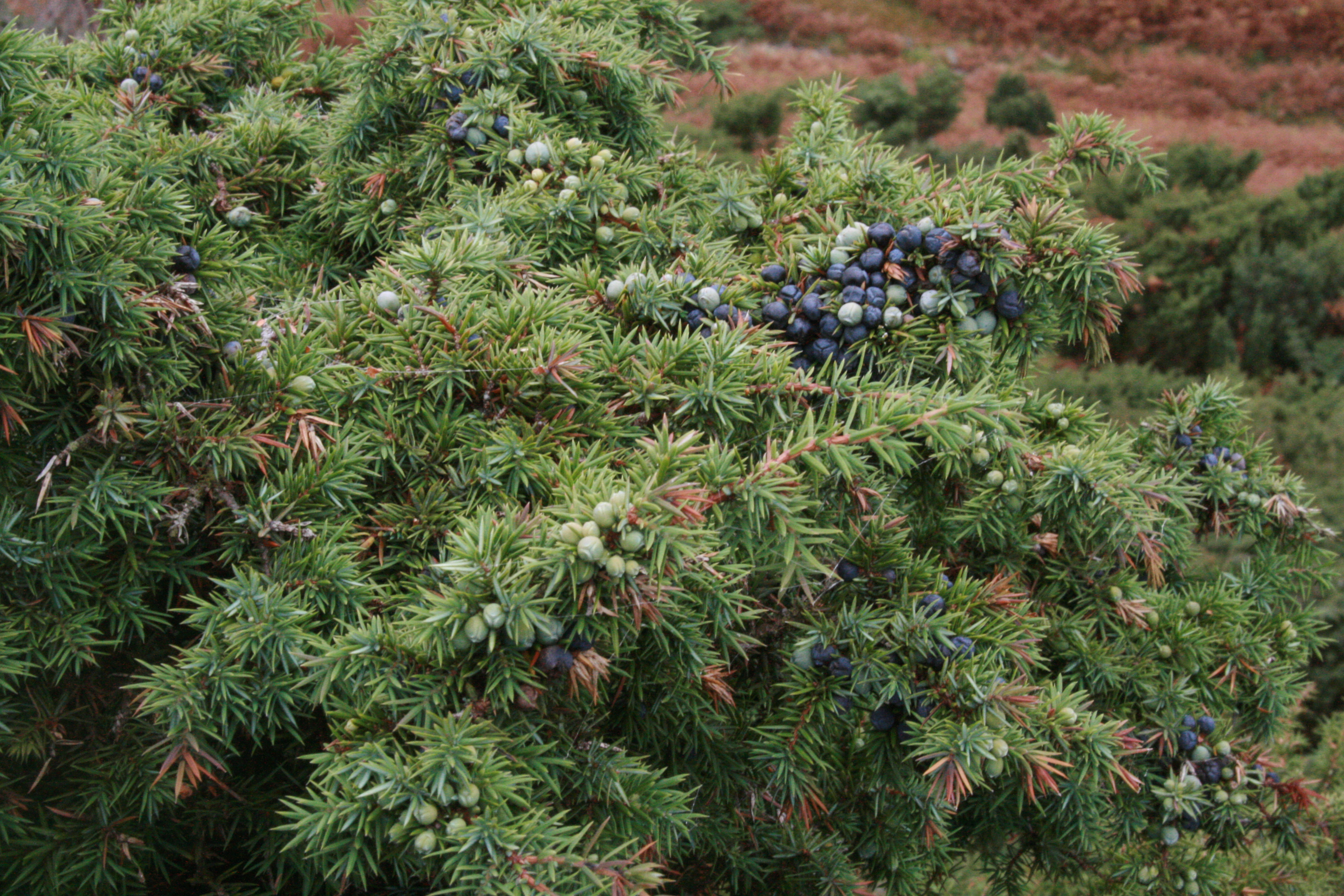
- Example - Juniper growing in the UK (Juniperus communis)

- Location within Gloucestershire
- Location of Juniper Hill, Edgeworth.
- Area of search: Gloucestershire
- Grid reference: SO928058 and SO928064
- Coordinates: 51.751297°N 2.104976°W
- Interest: Biological
- Area: 11.25 ha (27.8 acres)
- Notification date: 1974

Juniper Hill, Edgeworth (SO928058 and SO928064) is an 11.25-hectare (27.8-acre) biological Site of Special Scientific Interest in Gloucestershire, notified in 1974. The site is listed in the 'Cotswold District' Local Plan 2001-2011 (on line) as a Key Wildlife Site (KWS).

== Location ==
The site lies in the Cotswold Area of Outstanding Natural Beauty and is in two sections. It is one of a small number of sites on Jurassic limestone which has Juniper as its dominant species.

== Flora ==
The Juniper on the site is recorded as being of a great age, with specimens which are over 100 years old.

Ungrazed calcareous grassland makes up the northern section of the site, which consists mainly of Upright Brome, Tor-grass, Common Rock Rose and Old Man's Beard. Larger trees such as Oak and Ash are regenerating in this area. There is an adjacent Larch plantation which is supporting Juniper.

Grazed grassland makes up the southern section under the Juniper, and this is made up of a greater amount of fescues and herbs typical of the unimproved limestone grassland of the Cotswolds.

== Conservation ==
Many of the Juniper plants are dying and management is underway to attempt regeneration.

== SSSI Source ==
- Natural England SSSI information on the citation
- Natural England SSSI information on the Juniper Hill, Edgeworth unit
