= Oakenhill Railway Cutting =

- Site of Special Scientific Interest
- Location within Gloucestershire
- Location of Oakenhill Railway Cutting.
- Area of search: Gloucestershire
- Grid reference: SO630069
- Coordinates: 51.760007°N 2.536763°W
- Interest: Geological
- Area: 0.81 ha (2.0 acres)
- Notification date: 1985

Oakenhill Railway Cutting (grid reference SO630069) is a 0.81-hectare (2.0-acre) geological Site of Special Scientific Interest in Gloucestershire, notified in 1985.

The site is listed in the 'Forest of Dean Local Plan Review' as a Key Wildlife Site (KWS).

== Location and geology ==
The site is in the Forest of Dean near Yorkley and adjacent to Oakenhill Wood, and provides significant exposures of rock outcrops of the Carboniferous age. They were formed some 300 million years ago. The exposures are mostly shale layers which are separated by thin sandstones or coals. They are known as the Supra Pennant Group, and are a subdivision of the Coal Measures. The site is the only exposure of this kind in the Forest of Dean, and supports research into the geological development of the area through its fossil content. The area is central in relation to other Coal Measures in southern Britain.

== SSSI Source ==
- Natural England SSSI information on the citation
- Natural England SSSI information on the Oakenhill Railway Cutting unit
