= Foss Cross Quarry =

Site of Special Scientific Interest in Gloucestershire

- Site of Special Scientific Interest
- Location of Foss Cross Quarry.
- Area of search: Gloucestershire
- Grid reference: SP056092
- Coordinates: 51.781886°N 1.919501°W
- Interest: Geological
- Area: 0.67 ha (1.7 acres)
- Notification date: 1972

Foss Cross Quarry (grid reference SP056092) is a 0.67-hectare (1.7-acre) geological Site of Special Scientific Interest in Gloucestershire, notified in 1972. The site is listed in the 'Cotswold District' Local Plan 2001-2011 (on line) as a Key Wildlife Site (KWS) and a Regionally Important Geological Site (RIGS).

== Location and geology ==
The site lies in the Cotswold Area of Outstanding Natural Beauty and provides important exposures of White Limestone Formation (Middle Jurassic) in the county. The rocks have been interpreted as deposits which were laid down c.165 million years ago in a warm, shallow sea. The conditions for that exist today on the Bahama Banks in the Caribbean. There is a well-developed sedimentary structure with a variety of fossils.

The site is also important for the red fossil alga (Solenopora jurassica). This is called Beetroot Stone. Areas of hardened sea floor also occur. The site is a significant research area and has enabled geologists to reconstruct the environments of the ancient seas which covered much of Gloucestershire and Oxfordshire during the Middle Jurassic time interval.

== SSSI Source ==
- Natural England SSSI information on the citation
- Natural England SSSI information on the Foss Cross Quarry unit
