= Hornsleasow Roughs =

Biological Site of Special Scientific Interest in Gloucestershire, England

- Site of Special Scientific Interest
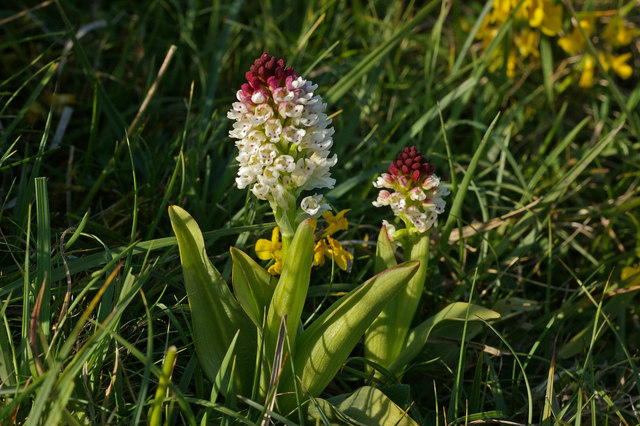
- Example - Burnt orchid (Orchis ustulata)

- Location within Gloucestershire
- Location of Hornsleasow Roughs.
- Area of search: Gloucestershire
- Grid reference: SP117323
- Coordinates: 51.989481°N 1.830298°W
- Interest: Biological
- Area: 28.24 ha (69.8 acres)
- Notification date: 1954

Hornsleasow Roughs (grid reference SP117323) is a 28.24-hectare (69.8-acre) biological Site of Special Scientific Interest in Gloucestershire, notified in 1954.

The site is listed in the 'Tewkesbury Borough Local Plan to 2011', adopted March 2006, Appendix 3 'Nature Conservation',' as a Key Wildlife Site (KWS).

== Location ==
The site lies in the Cotswold Area of Outstanding Natural Beauty and is nationally important Jurassic limestone grassland which supports locally rare plants. The majority of the site overlies old limestone workings, resulting in uneven terrain.

== Flora ==
The grassland is unimproved and varies according to depth of soil, angle of the slope and the aspect. This is an area which is grazed by sheep or cattle.

The site supports the nationally rare perfoliate pennycress and other rare plant life such as Curtis' mouse-ear, early gentian, field fleawort and burnt orchid. The Natural England assessment report of July 2011 indicates the range of orchid species expected for the site.

== Invertebrates ==
The site is also important for its butterflies and recorded are such species as green hairstreak.

== SSSI Source ==
- Natural England SSSI information on the citation
- Natural England SSSI information on the Hornsleasow Roughs unit
