= Scully Grove Quarry =

Site of Special Scientific Interest in Gloucestershire

- Site of Special Scientific Interest
- Location within Gloucestershire
- Location of Scully Grove Quarry.
- Area of search: Gloucestershire
- Grid reference: SO657186
- Coordinates: 51.86537°N 2.498805°W
- Interest: Geological
- Area: 0.4 ha (0.99 acres)
- Notification date: 1974

Scully Grove Quarry (grid reference SO657186) is a 0.4-hectare (0.99-acre) geological Site of Special Scientific Interest in Gloucestershire, England, notified in 1974.

The site is listed in the Forest of Dean Local Plan Review as a Key Wildlife Site (KWS).

== Location and geology ==
The quarry is in the north of the Forest of Dean near Mitcheldean, and is important for its unique features. The basal rock exposed is Crease Limestone which has been altered to dolomite. It represents a shallow water high energy deposit on a carbonate tamp. There is Whitehead Limestone (Chadian/Arundian) of up to 25 metres (82 ft) depth above the Crease Limestone. This shows a peritidal phase of deposition, and includes algal laminates, oncoid beds, thin soils and other features of a significant quality for research purposes. Above this is a small amount of fluvial deposits of the Drybrook Sandstone.

== Conservation ==
Natural England reported in March 2009 that scrub control was necessary to protect this site of geological interest.

== SSSI Source ==
- Natural England SSSI information on the citation
- Natural England SSSI information on the Scully Grove Quarry unit
