= Coaley Wood Quarries =

Site of Special Scientific Interest in Gloucestershire, England

- Site of Special Scientific Interest
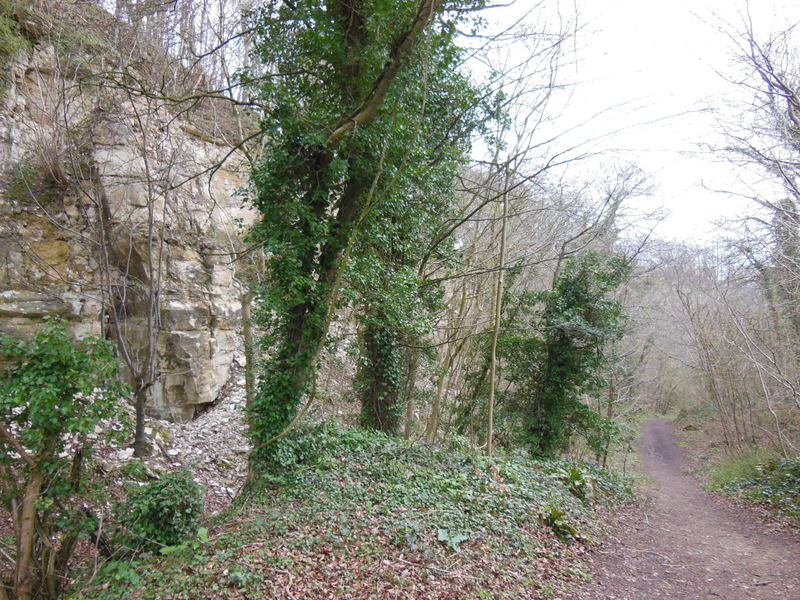
- Former quarries in Coaley Wood
- Location of Coaley Wood Quarries.
- Area of search: Gloucestershire
- Grid reference: ST786996
- Coordinates: 51.695188°N 2.310292°W
- Interest: Geological
- Area: 4.85 ha (12.0 acres)
- Notification date: 1974

Coaley Wood Quarries (grid reference ST786996) is a 4.85-hectare (12.0-acre) geological Site of Special Scientific Interest in Gloucestershire, notified in 1974.

The quarries lie within the Cotswold Area of Outstanding Natural Beauty. The site is listed in the ‘Stroud District’ Local Plan, adopted November 2005, Appendix 6 (online for download) as an SSSI and as a Regionally Important Geological Site (RIGS).

== Geology ==
The site is abundant with fossils of Lower Jurassic age in the stratum called the Cephalopod bed. There are particularly good examples of ammonites which allow greater accuracy in dating the rocks. The ammonites present indicate that the strata are of early striatulum Subzone age. The sunken lane cuttings provide exposures of the underlying Cotswold Sand Formation and a thin, isolated sandstone layer contains rare ammonites called Haugia.

== SSSI Source ==
- Natural England SSSI information on the citation
- Natural England SSSI information on the Coaley Wood Quarries unit
