= Turvey's Piece =

Biological SSSI in Gloucestershire, England

- Site of Special Scientific Interest
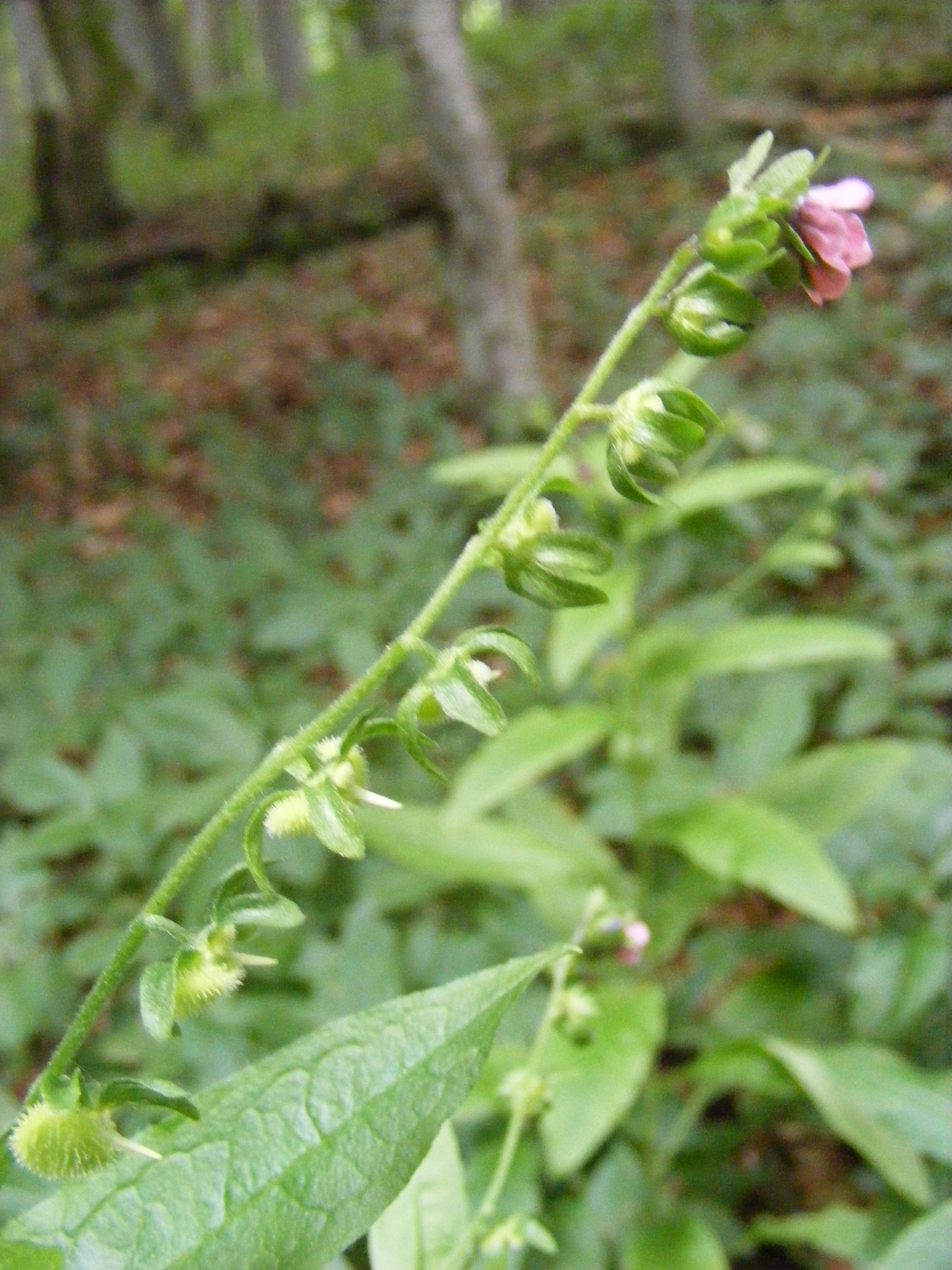
- Example - Green Hounds-tongue (Cynoglossum germanicum)

- Location within Gloucestershire
- Location of Turvey's Piece.
- Area of search: Gloucestershire
- Grid reference: SO882301
- Coordinates: 51.969696°N 2.172446°W
- Interest: Biological
- Area: 1.02 ha (2.5 acres)
- Notification date: 1993

Turvey's Piece (grid reference SO882301) is a 1.02-hectare (2.5-acre) biological Site of Special Scientific Interest in Gloucestershire near Deerhurst, notified in 1993.

== Location and habitat ==
The site is on the Lower Lias clays of the Severn Vale. It is a woodland plantation of long standing. It consists of Oak, Ash and the understorey is Hawthorn, Blackthorn, Elder, Field Rose and Crab Apple. The ground flora is mostly Common Nettle and Cow Parsley. Old ridge and furrow indications on the woodland floor mean that the previous use of the site was agricultural meadow.

== Flora ==
The site is special because of its nationally rare plants. Key is Green Hounds-tongue which is listed on Schedule 8 of the Wildlife and Countryside Act 1981 (as amended). This is the only site in Gloucestershire known to support this plant, and is the most western site of the population in Britain (there are twelve sites recorded nationally). This plant is a biennial which grows in woods and in hedgebanks, usually on disturbed or bare areas.

== Conservation ==
A Natural England assessment report of August 2010 indicates that the Green Hounds-tongue remains present, but states that the woodland is becoming denser.

== SSSI Source ==
- Natural England SSSI information on the citation
- Natural England SSSI information on the Turvey's Piece unit
