= Wood Green Quarry & Railway Cutting =

Site of Special Scientific Interest in Gloucestershire

- Site of Special Scientific Interest
- Location within Gloucestershire
- Location of Wood Green Quarry & Railway Cutting.
- Area of search: Gloucestershire
- Grid reference: SO694166
- Coordinates: 51.847604°N 2.444896°W
- Interest: Geological
- Area: 0.3 ha (0.74 acres)
- Notification date: 1966

Wood Green Quarry & Railway Cutting (grid reference SO694166) is a 0.3-hectare (0.74-acre) geological Site of Special Scientific Interest in Gloucestershire, notified in 1966.

== Location and geology ==
The site is in the Forest of Dean and is a significant research site.

The exposed section in the Ludlow Series of the Silurian period spans the Gorstian and Ludfordian stages. The type section is that for the Upper Flaxley Beds and the Lower and Upper Blaisdon Beds. Also visible is a continuous exposure to the Clifford's Mesne Sandstone of the Downtonian through the Longhope Beds.

The exposures shows the unconformity between the Lower Blaisdon Beds (top) and the Gorstian Upper Flaxley Beds. The site is a key stratigraphic locality for research of the Ludlow Series rocks of May Hill.

== SSSI Source ==
- Natural England SSSI information on the citation
- Natural England SSSI information on the Wood Green Quarry & Railway Cutting unit
