= Dixton Wood =

Protected area in Gloucestershire, England

- Site of Special Scientific Interest
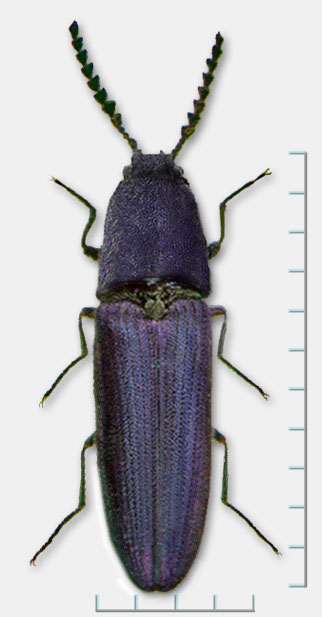
- Example - Violet Click Beetle (Limoniscus violaceus)

- Location within Gloucestershire
- Location of Dixton Wood.
- Area of search: Gloucestershire
- Grid reference: SO979313
- Coordinates: 51.980608°N 2.031257°W
- Interest: Biological
- Area: 13.14 ha (32.5 acres)
- Notification date: 2000

Dixton Wood (grid reference SO979313) is a 13.14-hectare (32.5-acre) biological Site of Special Scientific Interest in Gloucestershire, notified in 2000. Dixton Wood is recognised as a Special Area of Conservation (SAC) under the EU Habitats Directive.

== Location ==
The wood lies in the Cotswold Area of Outstanding Natural Beauty near Winchcombe and north of Cheltenham. It is a steep east facing woodland, which is surrounded by permanent grassland. It is in the foothills of the scarp and may be considered as a similar landscape feature as that of the nearby Bredon Hill which is a national nature reserve (NNR).

== Protected Species interest ==
The site is notified for its population of Violet Click Beetle (Limoniscus violaceus), and for a deadwood (saproxylic) beetle assemblage. The Violet Click Beetle is protected under Schedule 5 of the Wildlife and Countryside Act, 1981 (as amended) and listed on Annex IIa of the EC Directive 92/43/EEC on the conservation of natural habitats and of wild fauna and flora. Its presence indicates the great importance of the wood, and indicates habitat of a high quality for this special invertebrate group (deadwood beetle fauna).

The beetle is currently only known elsewhere in Britain on Bredon Hill NNR and in Windsor Forest. There are also some fifteen sites in central Europe.

== Woodland structure ==
There is a well-developed high forest structure and the management of the wood has yielded a number of large, low ash pollards and a range of deadwood. The moist clay soils, the eastern aspect and the ground and scrub maintain a humid microclimate. This is likely to enhance the decay process, which has resulted in a continuity of forest conditions.

Reports in by Natural England in November 2010 are detailed in the ageing of the trees, and planting needs to maintain the favourability of the site.

== SSSI Source ==
- Natural England SSSI information on the citation
- Natural England SSSI information on the Dixton Wood unit
