= Lydney Cliff =

Protected area in Gloucestershire, England

- Site of Special Scientific Interest
- Location within Gloucestershire
- Location of Lydney Cliff.
- Area of search: Gloucestershire
- Grid reference: SO654020
- Coordinates: 51.716106°N 2.501503°W
- Interest: Geological
- Area: 8.0 ha (20 acres)
- Notification date: 1990

Lydney Cliff (grid reference SO654020) is a 8.0-hectare (20-acre) geological Site of Special Scientific Interest in Gloucestershire, notified in 1990. Part of the site is included in the Severn Estuary SSSI.

== Geology ==
The site has exposures in the Raglan Marls (topmost) of the Lower Devonian time period (up to the level of the Psammosteus Limestone). The section includes calcrete profiles and a complex sand-body. The sandstone has fish fragments. The outcrop is significant for research in assessing the extent of marine tidal influence on the sequence in the Lower Old Red Sandstone (below the Psammosteus Limestone). The site has contributed significantly to the geological record (for calcrete soils).

The site has two important fish beds and the assemblage is regarded as proof of a marine incursion within environments which are predominantly estuarine to fluvial. Other fish beds present are fluvial. Species found are mixed. The location is significant for Sabrinacanthus arcuatus.

== SSSI Source ==
- Natural England SSSI information on the citation
- Natural England SSSI information on the Lydney Cliff units
