= Easter Park Farm Quarry =

Site of Special Scientific Interest in Gloucestershire

- Site of Special Scientific Interest
- Location within Gloucestershire
- Location of Easter Park Farm Quarry.
- Area of search: Gloucestershire
- Grid reference: SO810009
- Coordinates: 51.706963°N 2.27564°W
- Interest: Geological
- Area: 0.15 ha (0.37 acres)
- Notification date: 1986

Easter Park Farm Quarry (grid reference SO810009) is a 0.15-hectare (0.37-acre) geological Site of Special Scientific Interest in Gloucestershire, notified in 1986. The site is listed in the ‘Stroud District’ Local Plan, adopted November 2005, Appendix 6 (online for download) as an SSSI and a Regionally Important Geological Site (RIGS).

== Location and geology ==
The site is to the south west of Minchinhampton. It is important for the study of Middle Jurassic rocks of the Bathonian Stage. The exposed limestones contain a significant collection of fossil ammonites, which support them to be dated as morrisi zone. The rocks show the character change which occurs in rocks of this age from fine grained limestone to the coarser, oolitic limestones of Minchinhamption.

The limestones also contain fossil corals, echinoids, gastropods and bivalves.

== Conservation ==
Natural England reports in October 2011 that vegetation clearance is needed to maintain the favourability of the site.

== SSSI Source ==
- Natural England SSSI information on the citation
- Natural England SSSI information on the Easter Park Farm Quarry unit
