= Meezy Hurst =

- Site of Special Scientific Interest
- Location within Gloucestershire
- Location of Meezy Hurst.
- Area of search: Gloucestershire
- Grid reference: SO638089 to SO647091
- Coordinates: 51.778041°N 2.525381°W
- Interest: Geological
- Area: 4.3 ha (11 acres)
- Notification date: 1986

Meezy Hurst (SO638089 to SO647091) is a 4.3-hectare (11-acre) geological Site of Special Scientific Interest in Gloucestershire, notified in 1986.

The site is listed in the 'Forest of Dean Local Plan Review' as a Key Wildlife Site (KWS).

== Location and geology ==
The site is in the Forest of Dean and is at four separate locations. This is an area of disused quarries and dismantled railways. The exposures gives the lower part of the Westphalian succession of the Forest of Dean. The rocks were laid down some 310 million years ago in the Upper Carboniferous Period. The exposures provide a clear indication of contact with the underlying older rocks, and a good section through the whole of the Trenchard Group. The lower Pennant Group of the Upper Coal Measures are visible. The site is a significant research area for examination of how sedimentation spread into the area.

== SSSI Source ==
- Natural England SSSI information on the citation
- Natural England SSSI information on the Meezy Hurst unit
