= Campden Tunnel Gravel Pit =

Protected area in Gloucestershire, England

- Site of Special Scientific Interest
- Location of Campden Tunnel Gravel Pit.
- Area of search: Gloucestershire
- Grid reference: SP161408
- Coordinates: 52.065791°N 1.765825°W
- Interest: Geological
- Area: 0.2 ha (0.49 acres)
- Notification date: 1988

Campden Tunnel Gravel Pit (grid reference SP161408) is a 0.2-hectare (0.49-acre) geological Site of Special Scientific Interest in Gloucestershire, notified in 1988. The site is listed in the 'Cotswold District' Local Plan 2001-2011 (on line).

== Geology ==
The site exposes a mixture of gravels, sands and silts which make up the Campden Tunnel Drift (Pleistocene period). These are glacial sediments which fill a deep channel. The melt water is considered to have run from the ice-filled valley of the River Avon (north) to the drainage system of the River Evenlode (south east).

This links with the sequence of glacial deposits in the Midlands and the Upper Thames terraces (Evenlode Valley). The site also links with others in the Moreton-in-Marsh area, for example Stretton-on-Fosse.

== Conservation ==
The site is considered precious so it must only be used for research purposes.

== SSSI Source ==
- Natural England SSSI information on the citation
- Natural England SSSI information on the Campden Tunnel Gravel Pit unit
