= Notgrove Railway Cutting =

Protected area in Gloucestershire, England

- Site of Special Scientific Interest
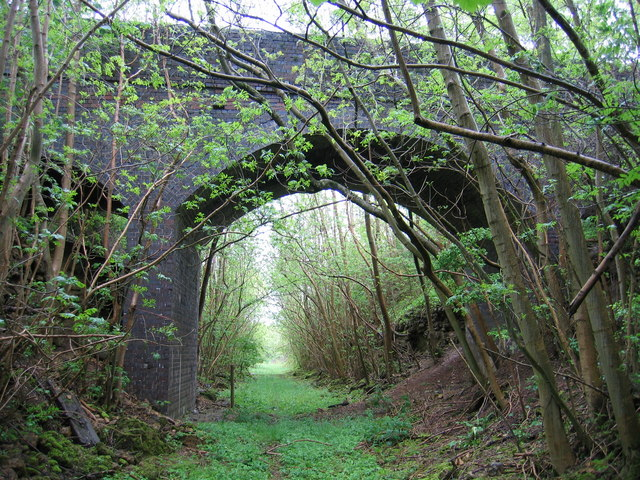
- Notgrove Railway Cutting

- Location within Gloucestershire
- Location of Notgrove Railway Cutting.
- Area of search: Gloucestershire
- Grid reference: SP086209
- Coordinates: 51.887042°N 1.875726°W
- Interest: Geological
- Area: 1.7 ha (4.2 acres)
- Notification date: 1974

Notgrove Railway Cutting (grid reference SP086209) is a 1.7-hectare (4.2-acre) geological Site of Special Scientific Interest in Gloucestershire, notified in 1974. The site is listed in the 'Cotswold District' Local Plan 2001-2011 (on line) as a Key Wildlife Site (KWS) and Regionally Important Geological Site (RIGS).

== Location and geology ==
The site (formerly Notgrove Railway Cuttings), near Notgrove and Salperton, is in the Cotswold Area of Outstanding Natural Beauty, and is a 'famous' geological site which yields excellent exposures of part of the Middle Jurassic, Upper Inferior Oolite period. Notgrove Freestone is the lowest formation which may be seen, and this is topped by a 'fine' example of 'hardground'. This is a thin layer of tough limestone (formed as a result of environmental changes). The tough limestone is overlain by Upper Trigonia Grit above which is approximately 12 m of Clypeus grit. The latter is considered to be the best, and most complete, section of such Grit in the Cotswolds, and is significant for research. There is a rich fossil fauna, and there have been several significant ammonite discoveries. The site is of national importance for geological research.

== SSSI Source ==
- Natural England SSSI information on the citation
- Natural England SSSI information on the Notgrove Railway unit
