= Boxwell SSSI =

Biological Site of Special Scientific Interest in Gloucestershire, England

Boxwell
- Site of Special Scientific Interest
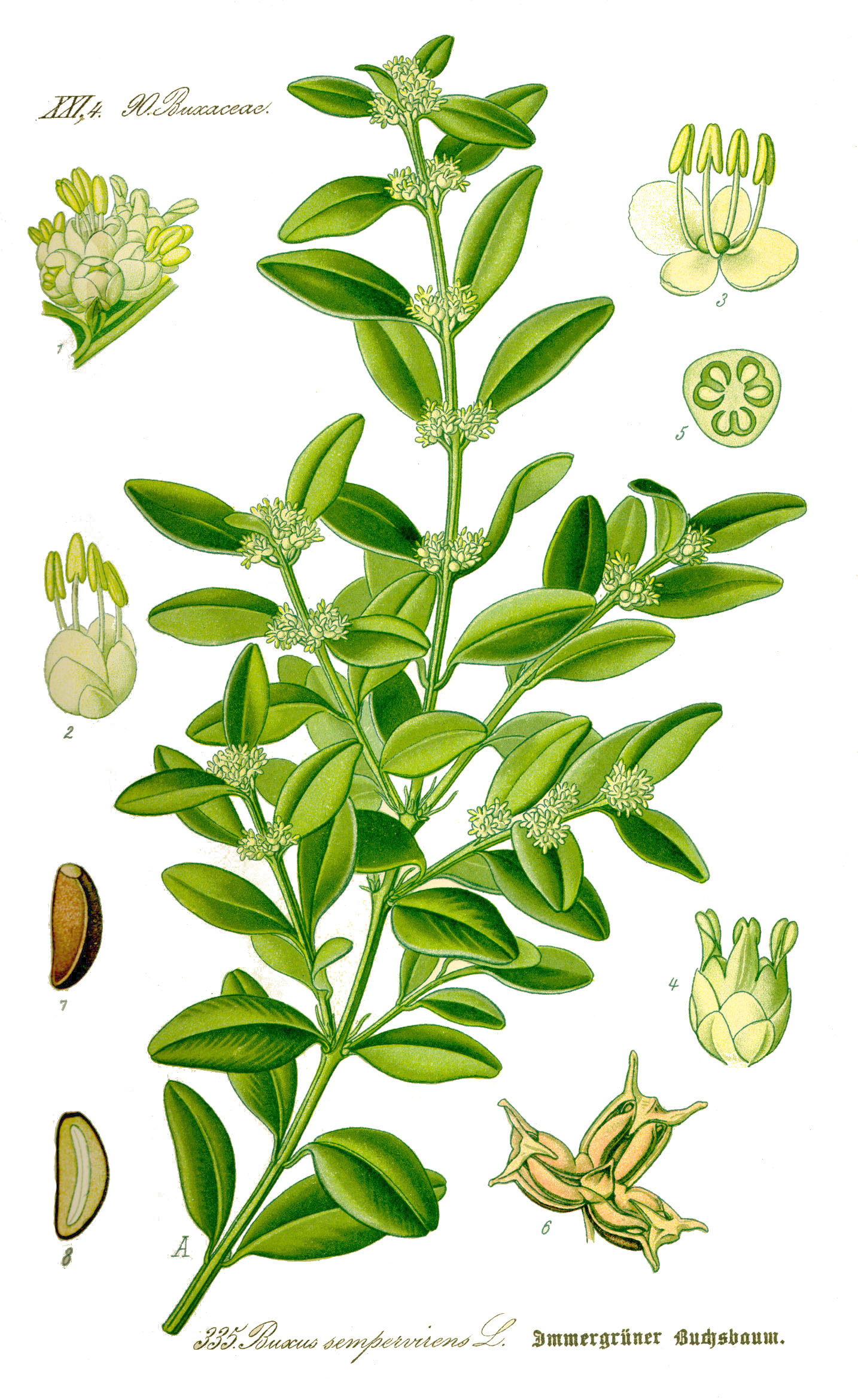
- Box (Buxus sempervirens)

- Location within Gloucestershire
- Location of Boxwell.
- Area of search: Gloucestershire
- Grid reference: ST816928
- Coordinates: 51.634156°N 2.266529°W
- Interest: Biological
- Area: 5.31 ha (13.1 acres)
- Notification date: 1954

Boxwell SSSI (grid reference ST816928) is a 5.31-hectare (13.1-acre) biological Site of Special Scientific Interest in Gloucestershire, notified in 1954. The site is listed in the 'Cotswold District' Local Plan 2001-2011 (on line) as a Key Wildlife Site (KWS).

== Location and habitat ==
The site is within the Cotswold Area of Outstanding Natural Beauty, and is situated on a steep south-west facing Jurassic limestone slope. The site is considered of national importance being one of only three in the country where Box (Buxus sempervirens) is believed to be native. The site represents the best example of tall scrub-woodland habitat in Britain.

== SSSI Source ==
- Natural England SSSI information on the citation
- Natural England SSSI information on the Boxwell unit
