= Land Grove Quarry, Mitcheldean =

Site of Special Scientific Interest in Gloucestershire

- Site of Special Scientific Interest
- Location within Gloucestershire
- Location of Land Grove Quarry, Mitcheldean.
- Area of search: Gloucestershire
- Grid reference: SO672185
- Coordinates: 51.864561°N 2.477012°W
- Interest: Geological
- Area: 3.8 ha (9.4 acres)
- Notification date: 1974

Land Grove Quarry, Mitcheldean (grid reference SO672185) is a 3.8-hectare (9.4-acre) geological Site of Special Scientific Interest in Gloucestershire, England, notified in 1974. The site is listed in the 'Forest of Dean Local Plan Review' as a Key Wildlife Site (KWS).

The site is a working quarry, but with only small scale quarrying being undertaken. This leaves good exposures as required by the designation.

== Location and geology ==
The site is on the north edge of the Forest of Dean and provides extensive exposures in the Brownstones of the Old Red Sandstone late Lower Devonian period. The sequence of muds, silts, sandstones and conglomerates provides a contrast with the sandstone sequences in the Brownstones (higher) and the Red Marls (lower). The size of the rivers appears to have increased during the Lower Old Red Sandstone period in South Wales. The proportion of channel sands which have been preserved have increased. The quarry shows a sequence which provides an illustration of an intermediate stage.

The quarry is a location for significant research and published papers reference the exposures of the site. The fossil fish remains are also of significant importance being rare in rocks of this age in this location (Welsh Borders and South Wales).

== SSSI Source ==
- Natural England SSSI information on the citation
- Natural England SSSI information on the Land Grove Quarry, Mitcheldean unit
