= Stony Furlong Railway Cutting =

Protected area in Gloucestershire, England

- Site of Special Scientific Interest
- Location within Gloucestershire
- Location of Stony Furlong Railway Cutting.
- Area of search: Gloucestershire
- Grid reference: SP063106
- Coordinates: 51.794466°N 1.909329°W
- Interest: Geological
- Area: 2.7 ha (6.7 acres)
- Notification date: 1987

Stony Furlong Railway Cutting (grid reference SP063106) is a 2.7-hectare (6.7-acre) geological Site of Special Scientific Interest in Gloucestershire, notified in 1987. The site is listed in the 'Cotswold District' Local Plan 2001-2011 (on line) as a Key Wildlife Site (KWS) and a Regionally Important Geological Site (RIGS).

== Location and geology ==
The site is located in east Gloucestershire, near Chedworth, and is significant as it shows an important section through the White Limestone (Bathonian, Middle Jurassic period). It is unique in the area for exhibition of the Shipton Member. The exposure demonstrates the south west passage of the Hampen Marly Beds. This links with similar exposures in Wiltshire, Oxfordshire and eastern Gloucestershire.

The site has produced significant findings of ammonites and a rarity of the morruisi Zone.

The site is a significant research resource.

== SSSI Source ==
- Natural England SSSI information on the citation
- Natural England SSSI information on the Stony Furlong Railway Cutting units
