= The Hudnalls =

Protected area in Gloucestershire, England

- Site of Special Scientific Interest
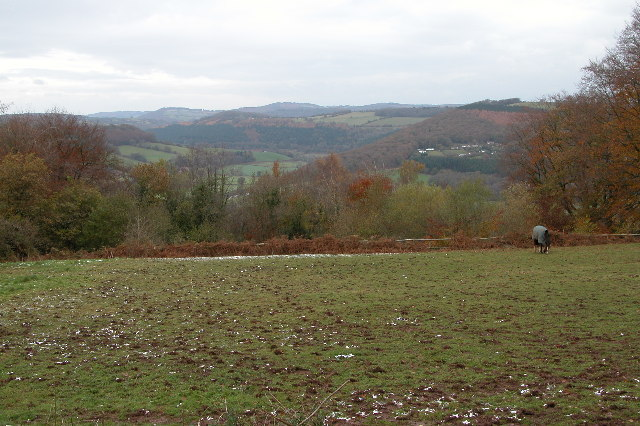
- View from The Hudnalls

- Location within Gloucestershire
- Location of The Hudnalls.
- Area of search: Gloucestershire
- Grid reference: SO533030 & SO540042 & SO545046
- Coordinates: 51.724218°N 2.67677°W
- Interest: Biological
- Area: 94.4 ha (233 acres)
- Notification date: 1972

The Hudnalls (SO533030 & SO540042 & SO545046 ) is a 94.4-hectare (233-acre) biological Site of Special Scientific Interest in Gloucestershire, notified in 1972. The site (including The Tuffs & The Nedge) is listed in the 'Forest of Dean Local Plan Review' as a Key Wildlife Site (KWS).

Wye Valley Woodlands/ Coetiroedd Dyffryn Gwy are recognised as a Special Area of Conservation (SAC) under the EU Habitats Directive.

== Location and habitat ==
There are eight separate units of assessment for this collection of woodlands which are in the Wye Valley Area of Outstanding Natural Beauty. Part of the site definition is registered as common land.

The Wye Valley is an important area in southern Britain for woodland conservation. The semi-natural woodland is plentiful, and continuous along the gorge. There are several other notified SSSIs in this region. The trees which make-up the woodlands are of many different types some of which are local, and there are rare species flourishing. There is unimproved grassland amongst the woodlands providing a rich mosaic and diverse habitats.

The Hudnalls is on steep slopes which face north and west, being valley sides along the River Wye, and a tributary, the Mork Brook. The site is between Bigsweir and Brockweir. There is some flat land at The Tuffs.

Old Red Sandstones, quartz conglomerate and other material contribute to the soil make-up which is mostly acidic. There are flushes, streams and springs where the soil is alkaline. Thus the rock formations and types of soil, together with how the area has been managed historically over the years, has contributed to the creation of one of the most interesting and diverse locations. Research has indicated a minimum of eleven different types of broadleaved woodland, which also means a ground flora which is different from wood to wood.

== Woodlands ==
There is beech woodland near the River Wye (ancient coppice). These woods included sessile oak and pedunculate oak, ash, small-leaved lime and silver birch. The shrub layer includes holly and hazel. The ground flora includes bramble, ivy and ferns. Wood fescue (Festuca altissima), which is nationally rare, is found in this location.

There is oak woodland as part of the notification complex. This is usually coppiced. The ground flora includes bilberry, bracken, and great wood-rush.

The Tuffs and Mocking Hazell Wood support dog's mercury and bluebell. In these woodlands a fern called Gymnocarpium dryopteris is recorded which is close to the southern limit of its geographic range.

The southern part of the notification complex is dominated by oak-lime woodland. There are few shrubs growing in this part, but the ground flora is plentiful and includes yellow archangel and wood fescue.

Alder grow along the sides of streams, particularly in The Tuffs.

Barbadoes Wood has a particular rich ground flora which includes ferns and saxifrages. There is hornbeam and alder buckthorn, both localised to the Wye Valley. There is an important bryophyte flora with a significant number recorded to date.

== Fauna ==
Woodlands support birdlife and breeding birds recorded are wood warbler, pied flycatcher, hawfinch, great spotted woodpecker and lesser spotted woodpecker. Hunting birds recorded are buzzard and sparrowhawk.

== SSSI Source ==
- Natural England SSSI information on the citation
- Natural England SSSI information on The Hudnall units
