= Range Farm Fields =

Biological Site of Special Scientific Interest in Gloucestershire, England

- Site of Special Scientific Interest
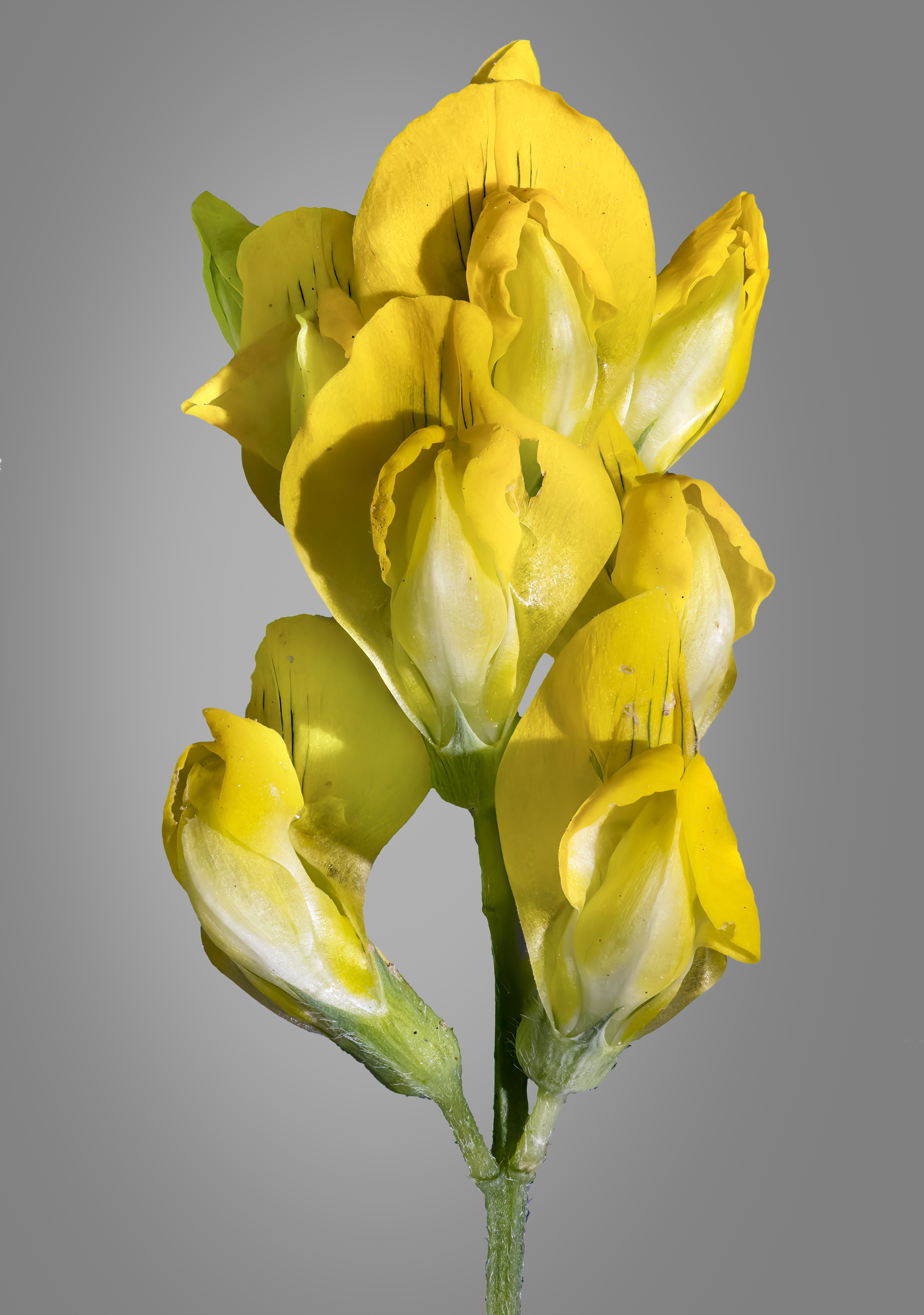
- Example – meadow vetchling (Lathyrus pratensis)

- Location within Gloucestershire
- Location of Range Farm Fields.
- Area of search: Gloucestershire
- Grid reference: SO850130
- Coordinates: 51.815876°N 2.218278°W
- Interest: Biological
- Area: 12.8 ha (32 acres)
- Notification date: 1996

Range Farm Fields (grid reference SO850130) is a 12.8-hectare (32-acre) biological Site of Special Scientific Interest in Gloucestershire, near to Gloucester City, notified in 1996.

== Location ==
The site lies in the Cotswold Area of Outstanding Natural Beauty and is in the Cotswold Hills Environmentally Sensitive Area (ESA). The geology is from the Jurassic time period which means it includes Lias Clay, silt, limestone and old landslip. The fields face north-west and are on a slope. There are four separate pastures with hedgerows. There is a relatively small area of bracken and woodland and it includes flushes and scrub areas.

== Habitat and flora ==
The site is a large flower-rich unimproved grassland area. Use and management has reduced the amount of this type of habitat nationally. The site is exceptional because of its size and the variations in the neutral grassland (acid to calcareous). Three grassland types are thus present – acidic, neutral and calcareous.

The unimproved grassland includes crested dog's-tail and common knapweed. There is heath-grass, meadow vetchling, lady's bedstraw. A large number of Cotswold sites was surveyed and Range Farm Fields was found to be the most diverse and to contain the three grassland types.

Herbs include oxeye daisy, devil's-bit scabious, yellow rattle and dyer's greenweed. One particular field has a large amount of great burnet. The latter is more common in flood meadows. Corky-fruited water-dropwort is also recorded.

Springs present encourage the species which flourish in such areas and these include sharp-flowered rush, marsh marigold, ragged robin, common spotted orchid and bird's-foot trefoil.

The site has significant wildlife value because of its many features such as mixed hedgerows, scrub and woodland as well as the grassland. Hedgerows are mainly hawthorn, bramble and field rose. The woodland is mainly ash and oak with a hazel understorey.

== SSSI Source ==
- Natural England SSSI information on the citation
- Natural England SSSI information on the Range Farm Fields unit
