= Dingle Wood =

Biological site of scientific interest

- Site of Special Scientific Interest
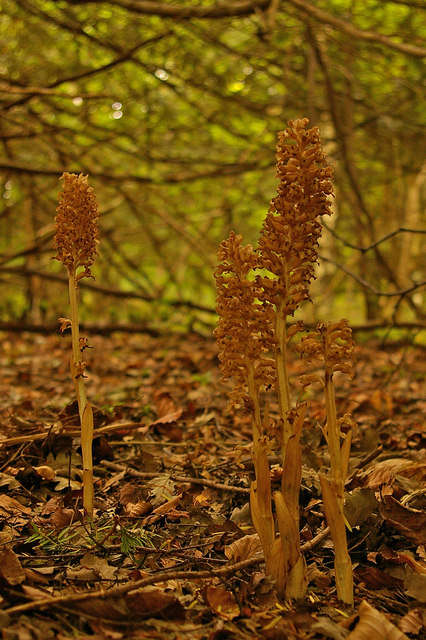
- Example - Bird's Nest Orchid (Neottia nidus-avis)
- Location of Dingle Wood.
- Area of search: Gloucestershire
- Grid reference: SO562115
- Coordinates: 51.800872°N 2.635862°W
- Interest: Biological
- Area: 9.95 ha (24.6 acres)
- Notification date: 1972

Dingle Wood (grid reference SO562115) is a 9.95-hectare (24.6-acre) biological Site of Special Scientific Interest in Gloucestershire, notified in 1972. The site is listed in the 'Forest of Dean Local Plan Review' as a Key Wildlife Site (KWS). The wood is located within the Forest of Dean Forest Park and the Wye Valley Area of Outstanding Natural Beauty.

== Location ==
The Forest of Dean has been an area for timber production for hundreds of years. This has been maintained by careful planting and woodland management regimes. There is a mosaic of woodland types. The central region of the Dean lies on Coal Measures of the Carboniferous time period. This supports Oak and the ground flora is lime-hating. Around this central area are the Carboniferous limestones and Devonian sandstones. These produce fertile soils and support a variety of woodland types with a richer ground flora.

== Woodland types and ground flora ==
Dingle Wood is a planted woodland but considered to be an example of the best type of woodland habitat. Types of trees include Oak, Ash, Beech, some Cherry and Rowan. Shrubs include Holly, Yew, Field Maple and Hazel.

The wood to the east is dominated by Bramble, Bluebell, Wood Anemone, Wood Sorrel and Ivy. The wood to the west has uneven terrain, and deep pits (Scowles) from old iron workings, and supports uncommon plants, for example Herb Paris, Common Wintergreen, Bird's Nest Orchid and the Greater Butterfly Orchid.

== SSSI Source ==
- Natural England SSSI information on the citation
- Natural England SSSI information on the Dingle Wood unit
