= Harford Railway Cutting =

Geological site in Gloucestershire, England

- Site of Special Scientific Interest
- Location within Gloucestershire
- Location of Harford Railway Cutting.
- Area of search: Gloucestershire
- Grid reference: SP135218 to SP141215
- Coordinates: 51.895037°N 1.804496°W
- Interest: Geological
- Area: 1.2 ha (3.0 acres)
- Notification date: 1974

Harford Railway Cutting (SP135218 to SP141215) is a 1.2-hectare (3.0-acre) geological Site of Special Scientific Interest in Gloucestershire, notified in 1974. The site is listed in the 'Cotswold District' Local Plan 2001-2011 (on line) as a Regionally Important Geological Site (RIGS).

== Location and geology ==
The site was formerly called Roundhill Railway Cuttings and lies within the Cotswold Area of Outstanding Natural Beauty near the River Windrush. The site exposures a critical Cotswold section in the Inferior Oolite of the Jurassic period spanning two stages and shows a sequence from the Aalenian Harford Sands and Tilestone of the Lower Inferior Oolite through the Clypeus Grit. Research publications report the site of prime importance in showing one of the few continuous sections through the Middle and Upper Inferior Oolite. This has resulted in a significantly complete set of records of consecutive ammonite faunas.

== SSSI Source ==
- Natural England SSSI information on the citation
- Natural England SSSI information on the Harford Railway Cutting unit
