= Innsworth Meadow =

Protected area in Gloucestershire, England

- Site of Special Scientific Interest
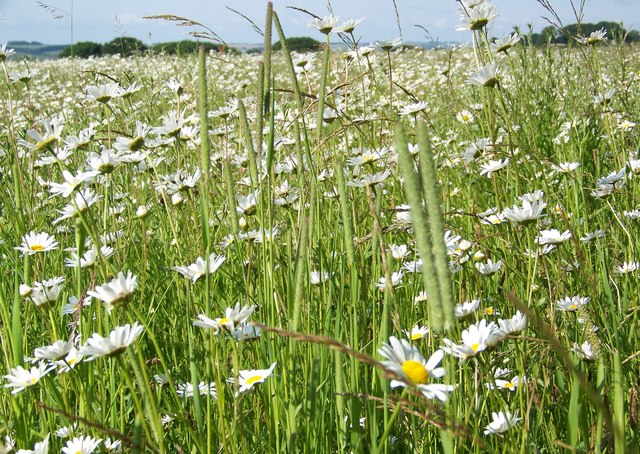
- Example - Meadow with Oxeye Daisies (Leucanthemum vulgare)

- Location within Gloucestershire
- Location of Innsworth Meadow.
- Area of search: Gloucestershire
- Grid reference: SO851216
- Coordinates: 51.8932°N 2.2172°W
- Interest: Biological
- Area: 2.9 ha (7.2 acres)
- Notification date: 1979

Innsworth Meadow (grid reference SO851216) is a 2.9-hectare (7.2-acre) biological Site of Special Scientific Interest in Gloucestershire, notified in 1979.

== Location and use ==
The meadow overlies Lower Lias clays. It is one example of a very small number of unimproved neutral grasslands remaining in the Severn Vale near Innsworth and Twigworth. It is used for the production of hay and stock grazing, and Natural England reports the status of this in September 2011.

== Flora ==
The meadow is old ridge and furrow grassland which has been traditionally managed. The dominant grasses are Common Bent, Red Fescue, Crested Dog’s-tail and Yorkshire Fog. Flowering herbs include Cowslip, Pepper Saxifrage, Yellow-rattle, Ox-eye Daisy, Great Burnet, the Green-winged Orchid and Corky-fruited Water Dropwort.

There are thick Hawthorn hedges, with some Ash trees on three sides.

== SSSI Source ==
- Natural England SSSI information on the citation
- Natural England SSSI information on the Innsworth Meadow unit
