= Walmore Common =

Nature reserve in Gloucestershire, England

- Site of Special Scientific Interest
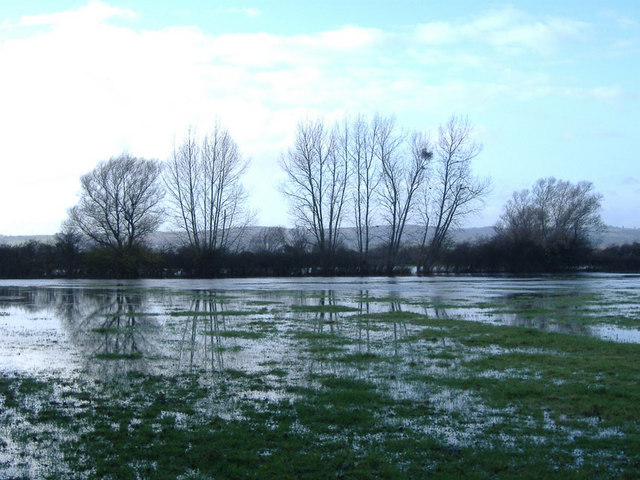
- Walmore Common

- Location within Gloucestershire
- Location of Walmore Common.
- Area of search: Gloucestershire
- Grid reference: SO740162 & SO745150
- Coordinates: 51.833476°N 2.370743°W
- Interest: Biological
- Area: 57.78 ha (142.8 acres)
- Notification date: 1966

Designations

Ramsar Wetland
- Official name: Walmore Common
- Designated: 5 December 1991
- Reference no.: 538

Walmore Common (grid reference SO740162 & grid reference SO745150) is a 57.78-hectare (142.8-acre) nature reserve on the flood-plain of the River Severn, west of the city of Gloucester in England and north of the village of Chaxhill. It was notified as a biological Site of Special Scientific Interest in 1966. The site is listed in the 'Forest of Dean Local Plan Review' as a Key Wildlife Site (KWS).

The common is recognised as a wetland area of international importance and is designated as a Ramsar site. The common is recognised as a Special Protection Area (SPA) under the EC Directive on the conservation of Wild Birds.

== Location and habitat ==
The site is in the Severn Vale and is subject to annual winter flooding. It is low-lying and comprises two sections. It overlies the only cited significant area of peat in Gloucestershire. It is a wetland site of local botanical and ornithological importance. The habitats are unimproved and improved neutral grassland, marshy grassland and open water ditches/rhynes.

== Flora ==
The eastern part of the designated area is dominated by wavy hair grass, marsh foxtail and creeping bent. The improved grassland is dominated by perennial rye grass, creeping bent and Timothy. The northern section is mostly marshy and comprises rush and sedge species. The marshes also support bog pimpernel and ragged robin. The ditches are significant as they are examples of a disappearing habitat. A wide range of wetland plants flourish with a large population of flote grass and several pondweeds. There are rarities including tubular water dropwort (Oenanthe fistulosa).

== Winter feeding ==
Its significance is as a winter feeding and roosting area for wildfowl. This includes Bewick's swans, wigeon, gadwall and shoveller.

== SSSI Source ==
- Natural England SSSI information on the citation
- Natural England SSSI information on the Walmore Common units
