= Winson Meadows =

Protected area in Gloucestershire, England

- Site of Special Scientific Interest
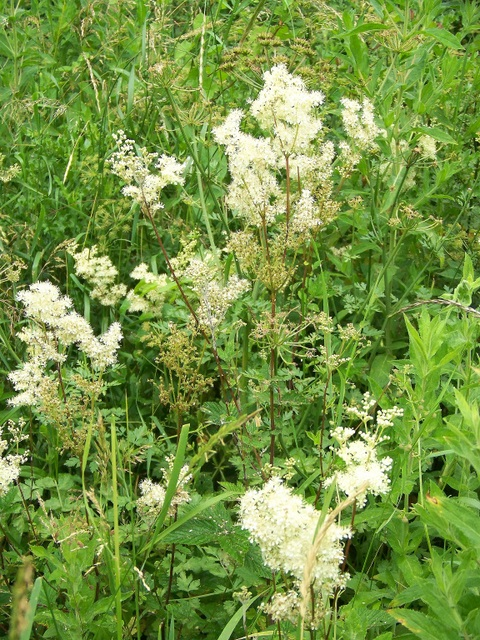
- Example - Meadowsweet growing in marsh (Filipendula ulmaria)

- Location within Gloucestershire
- Location of Winson Meadows.
- Area of search: Gloucestershire
- Grid reference: SP093081
- Coordinates: 51.771947°N 1.865896°W
- Interest: Biological
- Area: 7.93 ha (19.6 acres)
- Notification date: 1974

Winson Meadows (grid reference SP093081) is a 7.93-hectare (19.6-acre) biological Site of Special Scientific Interest in Gloucestershire, notified in 1974. The site is listed in the 'Cotswold District' Local Plan 2001-2011 (on line) as a Key Wildlife Site (KWS).

== Location and habitat ==
The site is in the Cotswold Area of Outstanding Natural Beauty and consists of two adjacent meadows on the floodplain of the River Coln. They are unimproved neutral grassland with marsh.

The southern meadow is continuously wet and can be considered a true water meadow. It shows evidence of previous management as a water meadow as it has a pattern of ditches. The northern meadow is not so wet. Both meadows include grasses such Meadow Foxtail, Yorkshire Fog, Crested Dog's-tail and Cocksfoot. There is some perennial Rye grass in partially improved areas.

The marsh vegetation includes Jointed Rush and Meadowsweet. Other species recorded are Yellow Flag Iris, Ragged Robin, Marsh Marigold and Southern Marsh Orchid.

== SSSI Source ==
- Natural England SSSI information on the citation
- Natural England SSSI information on the Winson Meadows unit
