= Veizey's Quarry =

Site of Special Scientific Interest in Gloucestershire

- Site of Special Scientific Interest
- Location within Gloucestershire
- Location of Veizey's Quarry.
- Area of search: Gloucestershire
- Grid reference: ST881944
- Coordinates: 51.648717°N 2.172668°W
- Interest: Geological
- Area: 1.4 ha (3.5 acres)
- Notification date: 1974

Veizey's Quarry (grid reference ST881944) is a 1.4 hectare geological Site of Special Scientific Interest near Tetbury in Gloucestershire, notified in 1974. It is in the Cotswold Area of Outstanding Natural Beauty. The site is listed in the 'Cotswold District' Local Plan 2001-2011 (on line) as a Key Wildlife Site (KWS) and a Regionally Important Geological Site (RIGS).

== Geology ==
The Quarry exposes the Upper Bathonian Athelstan Oolite and also the overlying Forest Marble. These are limestones of the Jurassic Period which was laid down 160 million years ago. This is considered the best example in the Tetbury area of the development of the Athelstan Oolite. This particular exposure is important in facies and stratigraphic interpretation of the Bathonian rocks.

== Sources ==
- Natural England SSSI information on citation, map and unit details
