= Brooks Head Grove =

Biological Site of Special Scientific Interest

- Site of Special Scientific Interest
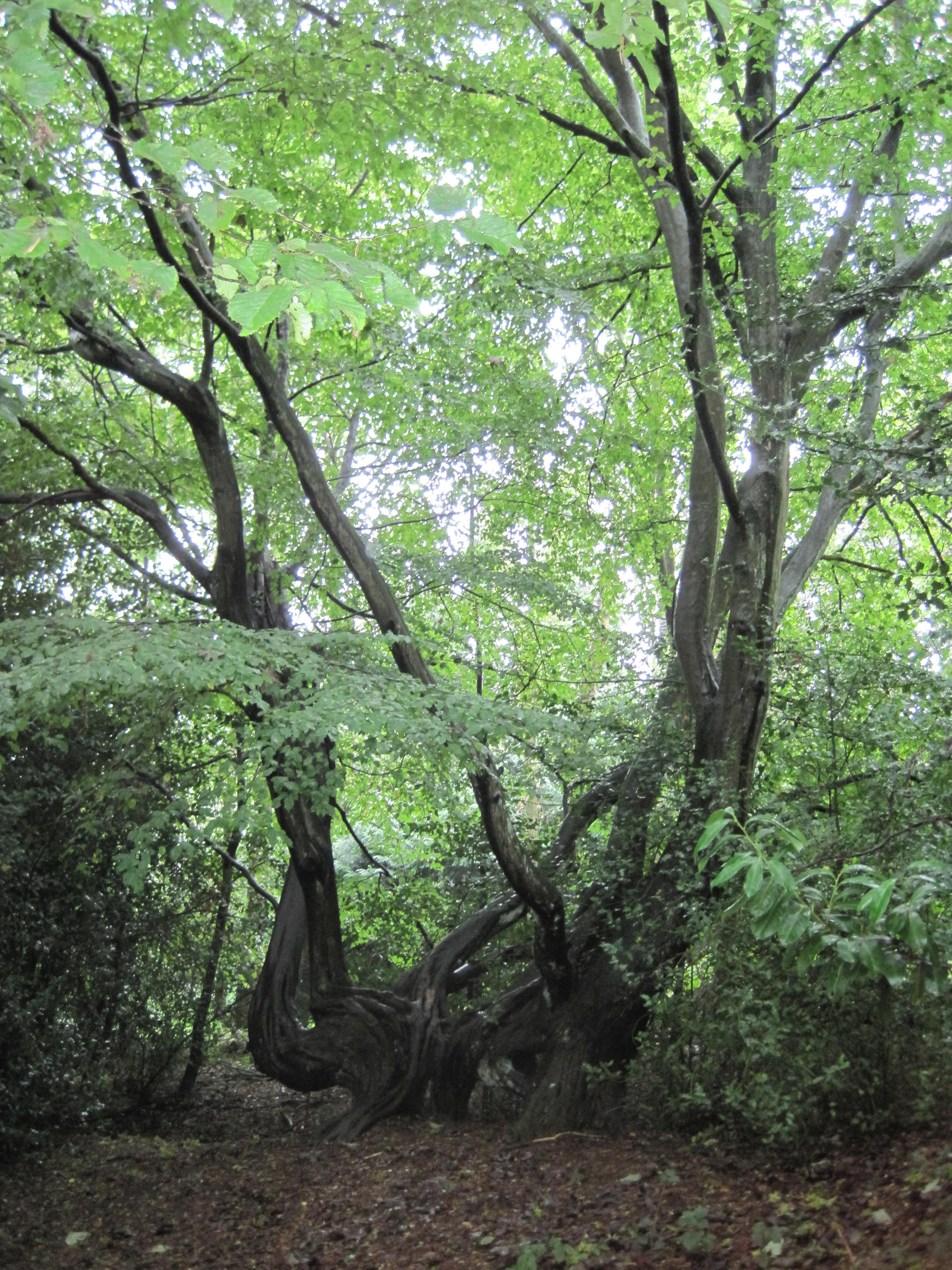
- Example - Hornbeam in a wood (Carpinus betulus)

- Location within Gloucestershire
- Location of Brooks Head Grove.
- Area of search: Gloucestershire
- Grid reference: SO586145
- Coordinates: 51.828027°N 2.601418°W
- Interest: Biological
- Area: 11.9 ha (29 acres)
- Notification date: 1986

Brooks Head Grove (grid reference SO586145) is an 11.9-hectare (29-acre) biological Site of Special Scientific Interest in Gloucestershire, notified in 1986. The site is listed in the 'Forest of Dean Local Plan Review' as a Key Wildlife Site (KWS).

== Location and habitat ==
It is situated within the Wye Valley Area of Outstanding Natural Beauty and is at the head of a small side valley of the River Wye south of English Bicknor. It overlies Carboniferous Lower dolomite and Lower Limestone Shales which produces calcareous soils. It is part of the range of ancient broadleaved woodlands in the Wye Valley. In this vast collection of woodland there are many rare and local species. These include Large-leaved Lime and Whitebeam, and trees near the edge of their European range such as Hornbeam.

== SSSI Source ==
- Natural England SSSI information on the citation
- Natural England SSSI information on the Brooks Head Grove units
