= Slade Brook =

Protected area in Gloucestershire, England

- Site of Special Scientific Interest
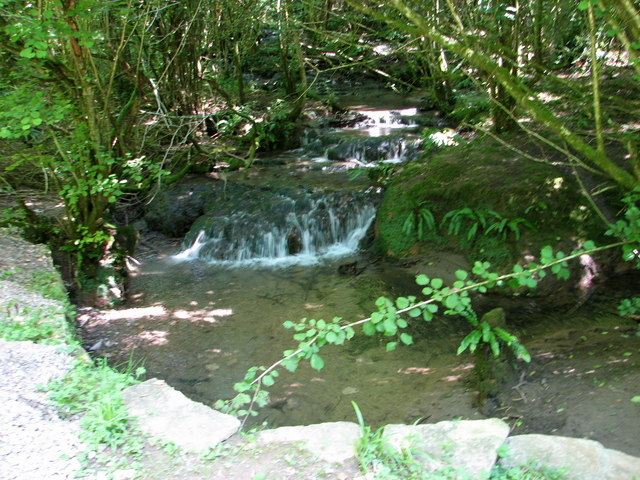
- Slade Brook showing tufa dams

- Location within Gloucestershire
- Location of Slade Brook.
- Area of search: Gloucestershire
- Grid reference: SO564055
- Coordinates: 51.746945°N 2.632207°W
- Interest: Biological/Geological
- Area: 3.63 ha (9.0 acres)
- Notification date: 2003

Slade Brook (grid reference SO564055) is a 3.63-hectare (9.0-acre) biological and geological Site of Special Scientific Interest in Gloucestershire, notified in 2003.

== Location and habitat ==
The site, which includes an active tufa-forming stream, is in the Forest of Dean plateau and Wye Valley Area of Outstanding Natural Beauty. The stream system has a series of tufa dams, plunge pools and connecting stream sections. This results from a combination of physical and chemical processes.

The Slade Brook rises on the Carboniferous Limestone of the Forest of Dean. It flows for two kilometres before joining the River Wye, which is also notified as an SSSI. Approximately a kilometre section of the stream includes the main focus of tufa deposition.

Rainwater (which percolates into sinkholes in the limestone), is enriched with dissolved calcium carbonate. When emerging from springs along the brook, the removal of carbon dioxide causes precipitation of calcium carbonate. The main deposits of the calcium carbonate are at a series of dam-like structures, which are constructed of tufa.

The process is assisted by vegetation (which includes tree litter such as twigs and branches), algae and mosses. The flow of the stream is slowed and photosynthesis encourages the removal of the carbon dioxide. The vegetation and debris then become the area for tufa accumulation.

The site is significant as tufa dams actively forming are relatively rare and this site has approximately sixty. They enable research into the origins of fossil tufa dams as well as modern formations

== Invertebrates ==
The white-letter hairstreak butterfly is recorded at this site.

== Conservation ==
Natural England reports in March 2009 that the site remains in a favourable active condition.

== SSSI Source ==
- Natural England SSSI information on the citation
- Natural England SSSI information on the Slade Brook unit
