= Garden Cliff =

Geological Site of Special Scientific Interest in Gloucestershire, England

- Site of Special Scientific Interest
- Garden Cliff near Westbury
- Location of Garden Cliff.
- Area of search: Gloucestershire
- Grid reference: SO718128
- Coordinates: 51.813566°N 2.409746°W
- Interest: Geological
- Area: 5.1 ha (13 acres)
- Notification date: 1954

Garden Cliff (grid reference SO718128) is a 5.1-hectare (13-acre) geological Site of Special Scientific Interest in Gloucestershire, notified in 1954.

== Location and geology ==
The site is near Westbury on Severn in the Forest of Dean district. This is an important research site for Rhaetic studies and was first described in some detail in 1822. It shows a complete local succession from the Tea Green Maria to the base of the Lower Lias. This is the type locality for the Westbury Bed and the site includes several bone beds. The site is important for comparative studies of the Rhaetic.

== Conservation ==
A Natural England report of August 2011 reports its good condition.

== SSSI Source ==
- Natural England SSSI information on the citation
- Natural England SSSI information on the Garden Cliff unit
