= Longhope Hill =

Protected area in Gloucestershire, England

- Site of Special Scientific Interest
- Location within Gloucestershire
- Location of Longhope Hill.
- Area of search: Gloucestershire
- Grid reference: SO693185
- Coordinates: 51.864681°N 2.446517°W
- Interest: Geological
- Area: 0.2 ha (0.49 acres)
- Notification date: 1989

Longhope Hill (grid reference SO693185) is a 0.2-hectare (0.49-acre) geological Site of Special Scientific Interest in Gloucestershire, notified in 1989.

== Location and geology ==
The site is in the Forest of Dean near Longhope in west Gloucestershire. The site is of particular importance for research of late Silurian rocks in the southern Welsh Borders region. The rock exposures show extensive and continuous section through the Lower and Upper Longhope Beds of the Ludfordian. These beds are overlain by Clifford's Mesne Sandstone. There are macrofaunas present and preserved marine microfloral assemblies.

== SSSI Source ==
- Natural England SSSI information on the citation
- Natural England SSSI information on the Longhope Hill unit
