= Edge Common =

Protected area in Gloucestershire, England

- Site of Special Scientific Interest
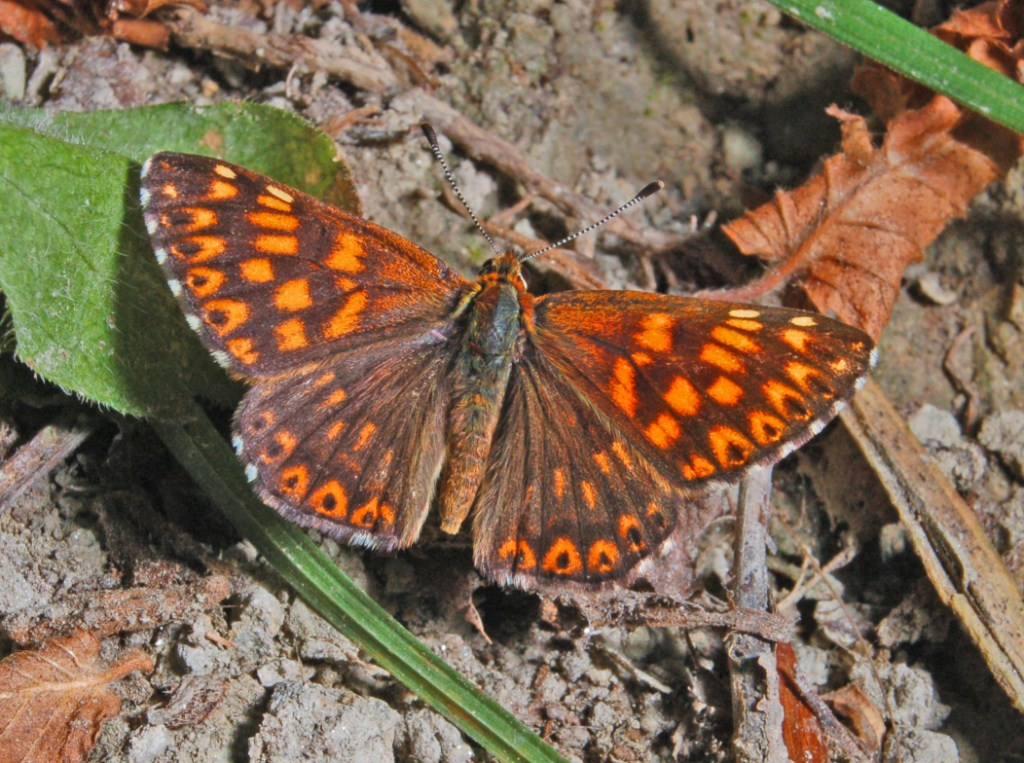
- Example - Duke of Burgundy (Hamearis lucina)
- Location of Edge Common.
- Area of search: Gloucestershire
- Grid reference: SO847092
- Coordinates: 51.781702°N 2.222462°W
- Interest: Biological
- Area: 20.47 ha (50.6 acres)
- Notification date: 1974

Edge Common (grid reference SO847092) is a 20.47-hectare (50.6-acre) biological Site of Special Scientific Interest in Gloucestershire, notified in 1974.

The Common is in the Cotswold Area of Outstanding Natural Beauty.

== Flora ==
The site is unimproved Jurassic limestone grassland. This is the type of grassland which was prevalent in the Cotswolds, and the site represents a good example. The grasses include Tor Grass, Upright Brome and there are typical calcareous herbs present. There is an area of Beech woodland, and Birch scrub, with scattered disused quarries.

== Invertebrates ==
It is a noted site for butterflies, particularly the Cotswold blues and the Duke of Burgundy. Grazing regimes are being managed to support this.

== SSSI Source ==
- Natural England SSSI information on the citation
- Natural England SSSI information on the Edge Common unit
