= Bushley Muzzard, Brimpsfield =

Protected area in Gloucestershire, England

- Site of Special Scientific Interest
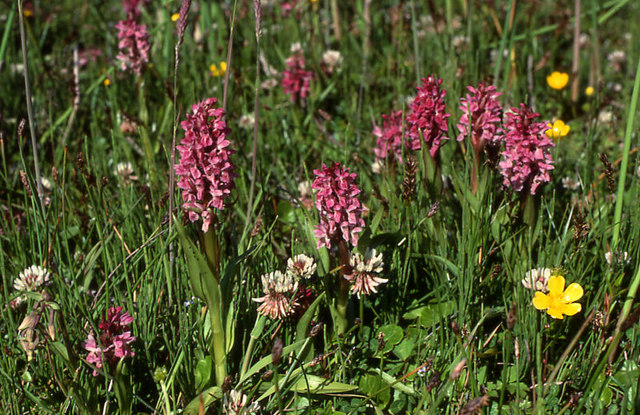
- Example: Early Marsh Orchids growing in a nature reserve
- Location of Bushley Muzzard, Brimpsfield.
- Area of search: Gloucestershire
- Grid reference: SO944133
- Coordinates: 51.818748°N 2.081921°W
- Interest: Biological
- Area: 1.13 ha (2.8 acres)
- Notification date: 1984

Bushley Muzzard, Brimpsfield (grid reference SO944133) is a 1.13-hectare (2.8-acre) biological Site of Special Scientific Interest in Gloucestershire, notified in 1984.

The site lies within the Cotswold Area of Outstanding Natural Beauty and was formerly called Watercombe Marsh. It is one of a limited number of marshes in the Cotswolds. There is a significant range of species, and a number of plants which are uncommon.

The site (name included of Brimpsfield Bog) is listed in the 'Cotswold District' Local Plan 2001-2011 (on line) as a Key Wildlife Site (KWS).

== Species ==
Whilst the designation is for the diversity of the species present, particular ones to note are some eight species of Sedge including Star Sedge (Carex echinata) and Yellow Sedge (C. lepidocarpa). Flat Sedge (Blysmus compressus) is recorded as abundant along with Marsh Arrowgrass, Water Mint and meadowsweet.

Orchid species include the Early Marsh Orchid (Dactylorhiza incarnata), and Hybrid Marsh Orchids such as D. fuchsii x incarnata and D. fuchsii x pratermissa.

== SSSI Source ==
- Natural England SSSI information on the citation
- Natural England SSSI information on the Bushley Muzzard, Brimpsfield unit
