= Nibley Knoll =

Geological Site of Special Scientific Interest in Gloucestershire

- Site of Special Scientific Interest
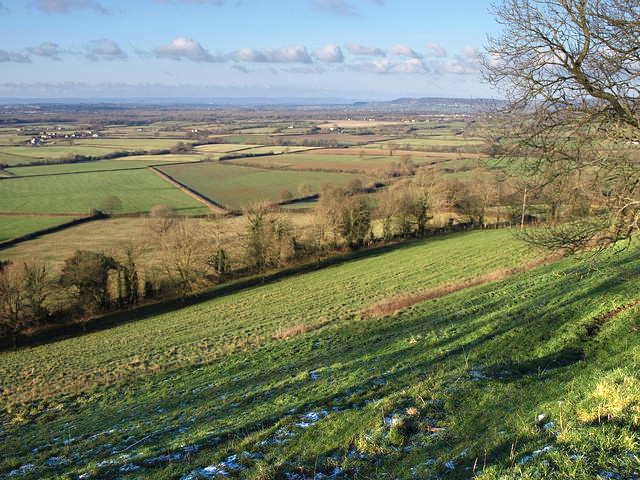
- Long distance view to Nibley Knoll and Wotton Hill

- Location within Gloucestershire
- Location of Nibley Knoll.
- Area of search: Gloucestershire
- Grid reference: ST744956
- Coordinates: 51.659048°N 2.370763°W
- Interest: Geological
- Area: 3.2 ha (7.9 acres)
- Notification date: 1974

Nibley Knoll (grid reference ST744956) is a 3.2-hectare (7.9-acre) geological Site of Special Scientific Interest in Gloucestershire, notified in 1974. The site is listed in the ‘Stroud District’ Local Plan, adopted November 2005, Appendix 6 (online for download) as an SSSI and a Regionally Important Geological Site (RIGS).

== Location and geology ==
The site is in the Cotswold Area of Outstanding Natural Beauty and is a significant geological location which shows a thick section of Lower and Middle Jurassic rocks. These span the junction between the Aalenian and Bajocian Stages. The lowest stratum which may be seen is the Cotswold Sand Formation of the Upper Lias. This is exposed in the sunken lane cuttings. The section above, which is the Cephalopod bed (top of the Aalenian Stage), is similar to the exposures on Wotton Hill. The Lower Inferior Oolite Freestones, are topped by 'hardground', which is a thin layer of tough limestone which is encrusted with fossil mollusc shells. One of the best fossiliferous sections is the Upper Trigonia Grit, which lies above the Freestone. There is an absence of Middle Inferior Oolite as a result of the effect of an important phase of uplift (warping) of the crust during the Lower Bajocian time interval. This demonstrates an important phase in earth movement in the region.

== SSSI Source ==
- Natural England SSSI information on the citation
- Natural England SSSI information on the Nibley Knoll unit
