= Kempley Daffodil Meadow =

Protected area in Gloucestershire, England

- Site of Special Scientific Interest
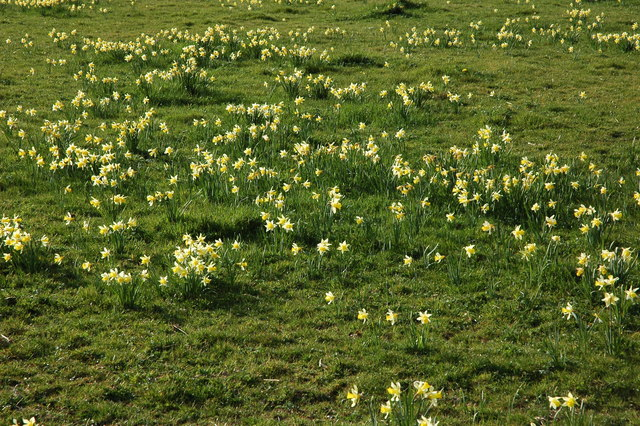
- Example of wild daffodils (Narcissus pseudonarcissus) in a meadow setting

- Location within Gloucestershire
- Location of Kempley Daffodil Meadow.
- Area of search: Gloucestershire
- Grid reference: SO676301
- Coordinates: 51.968875°N 2.472297°W
- Interest: Biological
- Area: 1.2 ha (3.0 acres)
- Notification date: 1986

Kempley Daffodil Meadow (grid reference SO676301) is a 1.2-hectare (3.0-acre) biological Site of Special Scientific Interest in Gloucestershire, notified in 1986.

The site is listed in the 'Forest of Dean Local Plan Review' as a Key Wildlife Site (KWS).

== Location and regional interest ==
The site is one of a limited number of similar meadows and woods in the Dymock and Newent areas which support the flowering of wild daffodil. The meadows are unimproved neutral grassland.

Dymock Woods is a nearby Site of Scientific Interest and supports flowering of wild daffodil, and there is a Daffodil Trail which incorporates a number of local nature reserves which support the conservation of the species.

== Flora and conservation ==
Natural England, in its report of May 2011, reports the coverage and density of the flowering as being 75% of the whole field and between 40% and 60% cover. Other species recorded in the meadow are lesser celandine, common sorrel, cuckooflower and creeping buttercup. The presence of a significant number of bumblebees was noted.

== SSSI Source ==
- Natural England SSSI information on the citation
- Natural England SSSI information on the Kempley Daffodil Meadow unit
