= Upham Meadow and Summer Leasow =

Common land in Gloucestershire, England managed for grazing and wildlife

- Site of Special Scientific Interest
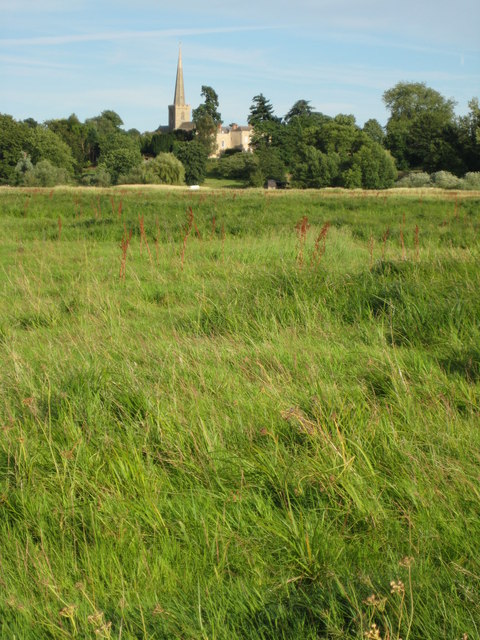
- Upham Meadow (known locally as Twyning Meadow)

- Location within Gloucestershire
- Location of Upham Meadow and Summer Leasow.
- Area of search: Gloucestershire
- Grid reference: SO917375
- Coordinates: 52.036291°N 2.121679°W
- Interest: Biological
- Area: 104.0 ha (257 acres)
- Notification date: 1991

Upham Meadow and Summer Leasow (grid reference SO917375) is a 104.0-hectare (257-acre) biological Site of Special Scientific Interest on the border between Gloucestershire and Herefordshire & Worcestershire, at Twyning and near Bredon, notified in 1991.

== Location and habitat ==
The site is common land (open access). The Meadows lie next to the River Avon on the border between counties. Upham Meadow is managed for a hay crop. Summer Leasow has restricted common grazing rights and is pasture. This land, which is semi-improved neutral grassland, is flooded in the winter. Thus the site is significant for its over-wintering waders and wildfowl, and breeding waders. This is a relatively large area, with a high water table and there is minimum disturbance. There are ditches and wet areas generally.

The photographs in the gallery below provide narrative on the use and rights.

== Flora ==
The site supports grasses and herbs which are typical of wet neutral meadows. Species include narrow-leaved water-dropwort (Oenanthe silaifolia), which is one of the largest populations in Great Britain. There is crested dog's tail, meadow foxtail, meadow buttercup, great burnet and meadow vetchling. The nationally scarce mousetail is recorded for this site (one of three locations in Gloucestershire).

== Birds ==
The site supports nationally significant numbers of breeding and over-wintering birds. Breeding birds include redshank, curlew, snipe and lapwing. The wet areas and ditches support reed warbler, sedge warbler, reed bunting and mallard.

Over-wintering sees the site used for feeding and roosting by large numbers of lapwing, dunlin, and golden plover. Recorded counts for golden plover indicate over two thousand. Recordings also show use by Bewick's swan in significant numbers. snipe, redshank and curlew over-winter at the site.

== SSSI source ==
- Natural England SSSI information on the citation
- Natural England SSSI information on the Upham Meadow And Summer Leasow units
