= Barton Bushes =

Biological Site of Special Scientific Interest in Gloucestershire, England

- Site of Special Scientific Interest
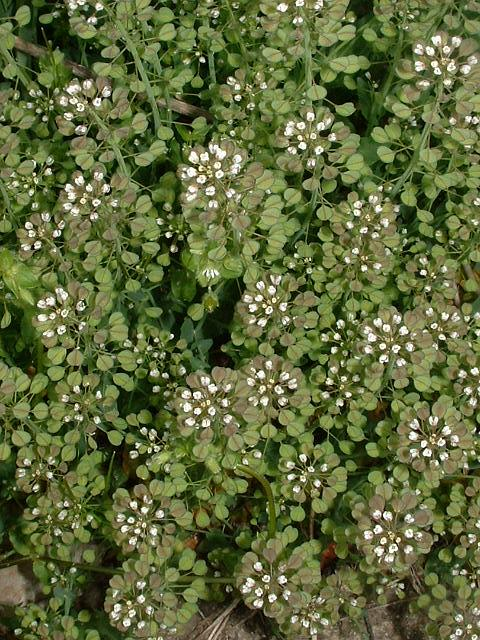
- Cotswold Pennycress (Thlaspi perfoliatum)

- Location within Gloucestershire
- Location of Barton Bushes.
- Area of search: Gloucestershire
- Grid reference: SP110259
- Coordinates: 51.931954°N 1.840696°W
- Interest: Biological
- Area: 5.7 ha (14 acres)
- Notification date: 1996

Barton Bushes (grid reference SP110259) is a 5.7-hectare (14-acre) biological Site of Special Scientific Interest in Gloucestershire, notified in 1996.

The site has local names being Barton Larches and Meadows Larches. It lies within the Cotswold Hills Environmentally Sensitive Area (ESA), and the Cotswolds Area of Outstanding Natural Beauty.

== Flora and fauna ==
The site is of special interest as it supports the nationally rare Cotswold Pennycress (Thlaspi perfoliatum), for unimproved limestone grassland and scrub and for its population of the nationally scarce Duke of Burgundy fritillary butterfly.

== SSSI Source ==
- Natural England SSSI information on the citation
- Natural England SSSI information on the Barton Bushes unit
