= Wildmoorway Meadows =

Protected area in Gloucestershire, England

- Site of Special Scientific Interest
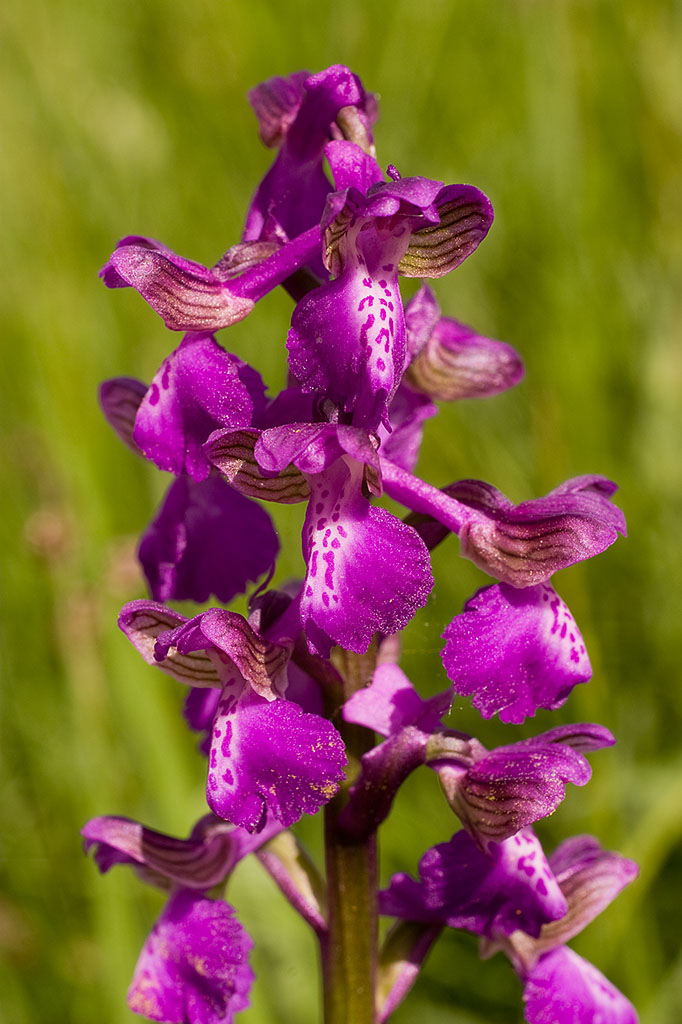
- Example - Green-winged Orchid (Orchis Morio)

- Location within Gloucestershire
- Location of Wildmoorway Meadows.
- Area of search: Gloucestershire
- Grid reference: SU066973
- Coordinates: 51.674881°N 1.905229°W
- Interest: Biological
- Area: 12.6 ha (31 acres)
- Notification date: 1989

Wildmoorway Meadows (grid reference SU066973) is a 12.6-hectare (31-acre) biological Site of Special Scientific Interest in Gloucestershire, to the east of Fairford, notified in 1989. The site is listed in the 'Cotswold District' Local Plan 2001-2011 (on line) as a Key Wildlife Site (KWS).

== Location and habitat ==
The site is between the River Churn and the disused Thames and Severn Canal. It is on the alluvium and gravels of the Thames floodplain. It is made up of a number of ancient, unimproved meadows and the old ridge and furrow remains visible. This is one of the largest remaining examples of its type in south-east Gloucestershire, and has been traditionally managed by hay cutting and grazing of stock.

== Flora ==
The grassland species include Crested Dog's-tail, Common Knapweed. There is an abundance of Quaking Grass and Sweet Vernal-grass. The species count of grasses and sedges is significant (more than 20). Typical herbs associated with old meadows are plentiful including Cowslip, Betony, Pepper Saxifrage and Ox-eye Daisy. Orchids include the Green-winged Orchid.

Meadowsweet, Ragged-robin and Reed Canary-grass are recorded in the wet areas. Orchids include Southern Marsh Orchid.

There is some scrub and individual old trees, particularly Black poplar, are present in the hedgerows.

== SSSI Source ==
- Natural England SSSI information on the citation
- Natural England SSSI information on the Wildmoorway Meadows unit
