= Wellacre Quarry =

Site of Special Scientific Interest in Gloucestershire

- Site of Special Scientific Interest
- Location within Gloucestershire
- Location of Wellacre Quarry.
- Area of search: Gloucestershire
- Grid reference: SP180370
- Coordinates: 52.031569°N 1.738308°W
- Interest: Geological
- Area: 12.3 ha (30 acres)
- Notification date: 1974

Wellacre Quarry (grid reference SP180370) is a 12.3 hectare geological Site of Special Scientific Interest in Gloucestershire, notified in 1974. It is within the Cotswold Area of Outstanding Natural Beauty and the site was formerly known as Blockley Station Brickworks. The site is listed in the 'Cotswold District' Local Plan 2001-2011 (on line) as a Key Wildlife Site (KWS) and a Regionally Important Geological Site (RIGS).

== Geology ==
The site is stated as providing the best exposures in Britain of part of the Lower Jurassic, Middle Lias rock succession. This is the subdivision called Luridum Subzone. In other places in Britain this subzone is thin and incomplete, but at Wellacre Quarry it is thick, richly fossiliferous, and there is full research documentation available.

The strata contain an abundant fossil fauna. This includes an important suite of ammonites. Specimens from this site have been the subject of research and have provided insight into the evolution and shape of ammonites.

== Conservation ==
A Natural England report, published in August 2011 (assessment date), states that the conditions of the site remain favourable. Wellacre remains a working quarry and exposures are being created constantly. The quarry remains in the original SSSI boundary and is deep. Restoration plans will eventually be needed.

== Sources ==
- Natural England SSSI information on citation
- Natural England SSSI information on the Wellacre Quarry unit
