= Jackdaw Quarry =

Site of Special Scientific Interest in Gloucestershire

- Site of Special Scientific Interest
- Location within Gloucestershire
- Location of Jackdaw Quarry.
- Area of search: Gloucestershire
- Grid reference: SP077309
- Coordinates: 51.976963°N 1.88858°W
- Interest: Geological
- Area: 4.78 ha (11.8 acres)
- Notification date: 1985

Jackdaw Quarry (grid reference SP077309) is a 4.78-hectare (11.8-acre) geological Site of Special Scientific Interest in Gloucestershire, notified in 1985.

== Location and geology ==
The site is in the Cotswold Area of Outstanding Natural Beauty to the north of the county. It provides significant exposures of a succession in the Inferior Oolite strata of the Middle Jurassic time interval. These exhibit characteristics unique to the north Cotswolds. They span the Junction between the Aalenian and Bajocian Stages.

The evidence shows that the site lay within an extensive area called the Moreton Swell. This was uplifted in early Bajocian times. The site is important for geological research, and of significant value in reconstruction of the geography of the Middle Jurassic time period.

== SSSI Source ==
- Natural England SSSI information on the citation
- Natural England SSSI information on the Jackdaw Quarry unit
