= Highbury Wood =

Protected area in Gloucestershire, England

- Site of Special Scientific Interest
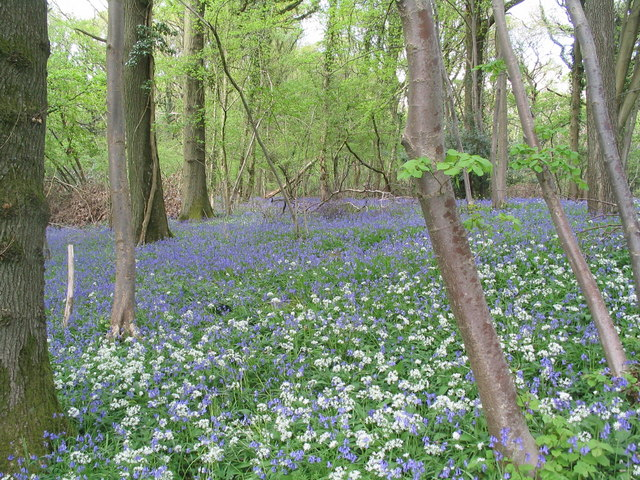
- Wild garlic and bluebells in Highbury Wood
- Location of Highbury Wood.
- Area of search: Gloucestershire
- Grid reference: SO540086
- Coordinates: 51.774623°N 2.667379°W
- Interest: Biological
- Area: 50.74 ha (125.4 acres)
- Notification date: 1983

Highbury Wood (grid reference SO540086) is a 50.74-hectare (125.4-acre) biological Site of Special Scientific Interest in Gloucestershire, notified in 1983.

The site is listed in the 'Forest of Dean Local Plan Review' as a Key Wildlife Site (KWS).

== Location ==
The site, which is also a national nature reserve (NNR), lies in the Wye Valley Area of Outstanding Natural Beauty. The woodlands of the lower Wye Valley are considered one of the most important areas for woodland conservation in Britain.

Wye Valley Woodlands/ Coetiroedd Dyffryn Gwy are recognised as a Special Area of Conservation (SAC) under the EU Habitats Directive.

== Flora ==
The woods are a variety of types which are localised to the particular soils of the area. Most of the woodlands are a rich mixture of varieties and are the same as the original natural woods of the Wye Valley. They include rare and local species and the rarities include large-leaved lime, whitebeam, and other trees close to the edge of their European range such as hornbeam and beech.

The wood lies in a matrix of unimproved grassland and other habitats which contributes to making the Wye Valley one of the significantly diverse and most attractive areas in southern Britain. Highbury Wood overlies mostly alkaline soils and contains a range of woodland species such as ash, oak and lime. It also has whitebeam which is on the western edge of its geographical range.

The ground flora is mostly bramble, dog's mercury, bluebell and wild garlic. There is a range of rarer species including the greater butterfly orchid.

== Fauna ==
Two rare molluscs are reported in the wood being Phenacolimax major and Macrogastra rolphi. It is an ideal site for invertebrates; butterflies recorded include the silver-washed fritillary.

== SSSI Source ==
- Natural England SSSI information on the citation
- Natural England SSSI information on the Highbury Wood units
