= Cotswold Commons and Beechwoods =

Biological Site of Special Scientific Interest in Gloucestershire, England

- Site of Special Scientific Interest
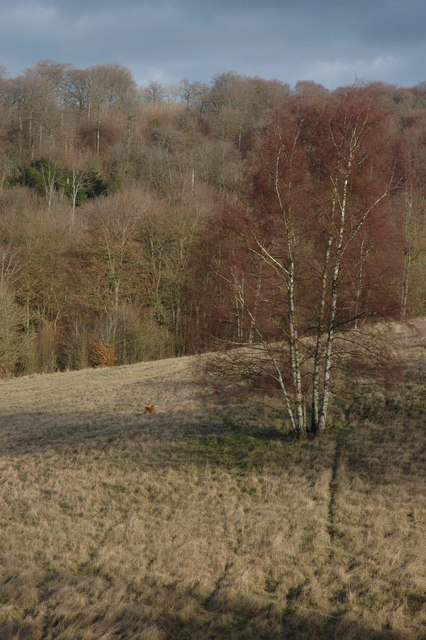
- Cranham Common
- Location of Cotswold Commons and Beechwoods.
- Area of search: Gloucestershire
- Grid reference: SO900130
- Coordinates: 51.815989°N 2.145745°W
- Interest: Biological
- Area: 665.5 ha (1,644 acres)
- Notification date: 1954

Cotswold Commons and Beechwoods (grid reference SO900130) is a 665.5-hectare (1,644-acre) biological Site of Special Scientific Interest in Gloucestershire, notified in 1954.

The Commons and Beechwoods lie within the Cotswold Area of Outstanding Natural Beauty. The site includes the Cotswold Commons and Beechwoods National Nature Reserve and Cooper's Hill Local Nature Reserve. It is part registered as common land and part owned by National Trust.

The Cotswold Beechwoods are recognised as a Special Area of Conservation (SAC) under the EU Habitats Directive.

== Location ==
The site comprises ancient Beech woodland and unimproved grassland. It overlies Jurassic limestones and is at the western edge of the Cotswolds. It is located around the villages of Sheepscombe and Cranham, and along the top of the scarp between Painswick and Birdlip.

== Species ==
The woodlands are diverse in their species, and the grasslands are typical of unimproved calcareous pastures well known for the area. The area supports many rare species of plants (including several varieties of orchid) and is an exceptional area for invertebrates. There are some disused limestone mines which are used as winter roosts by several bat species.

== Woodland ==
The beechwoods are currently developed as a high forest structure, but have a long history of management for timber.

== Commons ==
The unimproved limestone grassland is mainly the common lands at Painswick Beacon, Cranham and Sheepscombe.

== Publications ==
- Natural England publication on 'Buckholt Wood: Cotswold Commons and Beechwoods National Nature Reserve, (NE335), July 2012

== SSSI Source ==
- Natural England SSSI information on the citation
- Natural England SSSI information on the Cotswold Commons and Beechwoods units
