= Ridley Bottom, Tidenham =

Nature reserve in Gloucestershire, England

Ridley Bottom
- Location within Gloucestershire
- Type: Gloucestershire Wildlife Trust nature reserve
- Location: Forest of Dean edge, Wye Valley, near Tidenham
- Coordinates: 51°41′2.41″N 2°37′58″W
- Area: 2.58 acres (1.04 ha)
- Created: 1985
- Operator: Gloucestershire Wildlife Trust
- Status: Open all year

Ridley Bottom (grid reference ST563985) is a 1.1-hectare (2.7-acre) nature reserve in Gloucestershire. The site is listed in the 'Forest of Dean Local Plan Review' as a Key Wildlife Site (KWS).

The site is owned and managed by the Gloucestershire Wildlife Trust. It is one of the Gloucestershire Wildlife Trust's first nature reserves and was given to the Trust in 1985 in memory of Mr. K. Ridley, naturalist and supporter of the activities of the Wildlife Trust.

== Location and habitat ==
The reserve is secluded and small and is between Parson's Allotment and Turnips Grove in Tidenham. It is made up of three small fields and coppiced woodland. It is on a gentle north facing slope on Carboniferous limestone and Red Sandstone. The fields have not been 'agriculturally improved'. The management regime is hay cutting in July/August and grazing by sheep from August to the year end.

== Meadow flora ==
The meadows are surrounded by old lime hedgerows. Meadow plants include cowslip, lady's bedstraw, common milkwort, salad burnet, field scabious, yellow-wort and fragrant orchid. Woodland type plants still grow, such as wood anemone and primrose, indicating that the fields had a wooded past.

Heath spotted-orchid, lesser butterfly-orchid and adder's-tongue have been recorded. Recorded also are common cow-wheat, lousewort, bitter-vetch and tormentil.

== Woodland coppice and flora ==
The wooded part is a relic of ancient woodland and is small-leaved lime, ash, oak and birch. Hazel, holly, yew, dogwood, field maple and whitebeam are found within the shrub layer. Spring flowers included bluebell, early purple orchid, wood anemone, herb paris, primrose, snowdrop, woodruff and yellow archangel.

== Birds and invertebrates ==
The reserve supports woodland and grassland species such as blackcap, linnet, tree pipit, coal tit, goldcrest, turtle dove, great spotted woodpecker, pied wagtail and jackdaw.

Butterflies recorded include holly blue, speckled wood, peacock and the pearl-bordered fritillary.

== Conservation ==
As well as the grazing and hay cutting regimes, thinning is necessary in the woodland, and hedges need to be trimmed and layered at intervals.

== Walks ==
There is a publication which details a walk for recreation, observing wildlife and notable views in the Wye Valley. This includes information on Offa's Dyke Path, the Gloucestershire Way, and includes information on Devil's Pulpit (Tintern), Lippets Grove, Passage Grove, Caswell Woods SSSI, Oakhill Wood, East Wood nature reserve, Ridley Bottom nature reserve, and Poor's Allotment SSSI.

== Publications ==
- Kelham, A, Sanderson, J, Doe, J, Edgeley-Smith, M, et al., 1979, 1990, 2002 editions, 'Nature Reserves of the Gloucestershire Trust for Nature Conservation/Gloucestershire Wildlife Trust'
- 'Nature Reserve Guide – discover the wild Gloucestershire on your doorstep' - 50th Anniversary, January 2011, Gloucestershire Wildlife Trust
- 'Where to see Wildlife in the Forest of Dean', January 2012, Gloucestershire Wildlife Trust
- 'Tidenham Wildlife Walk', March 2012, Gloucestershire Wildlife Trust
