= East Wood, Tidenham =

Nature reserve in Gloucestershire, England

East Wood
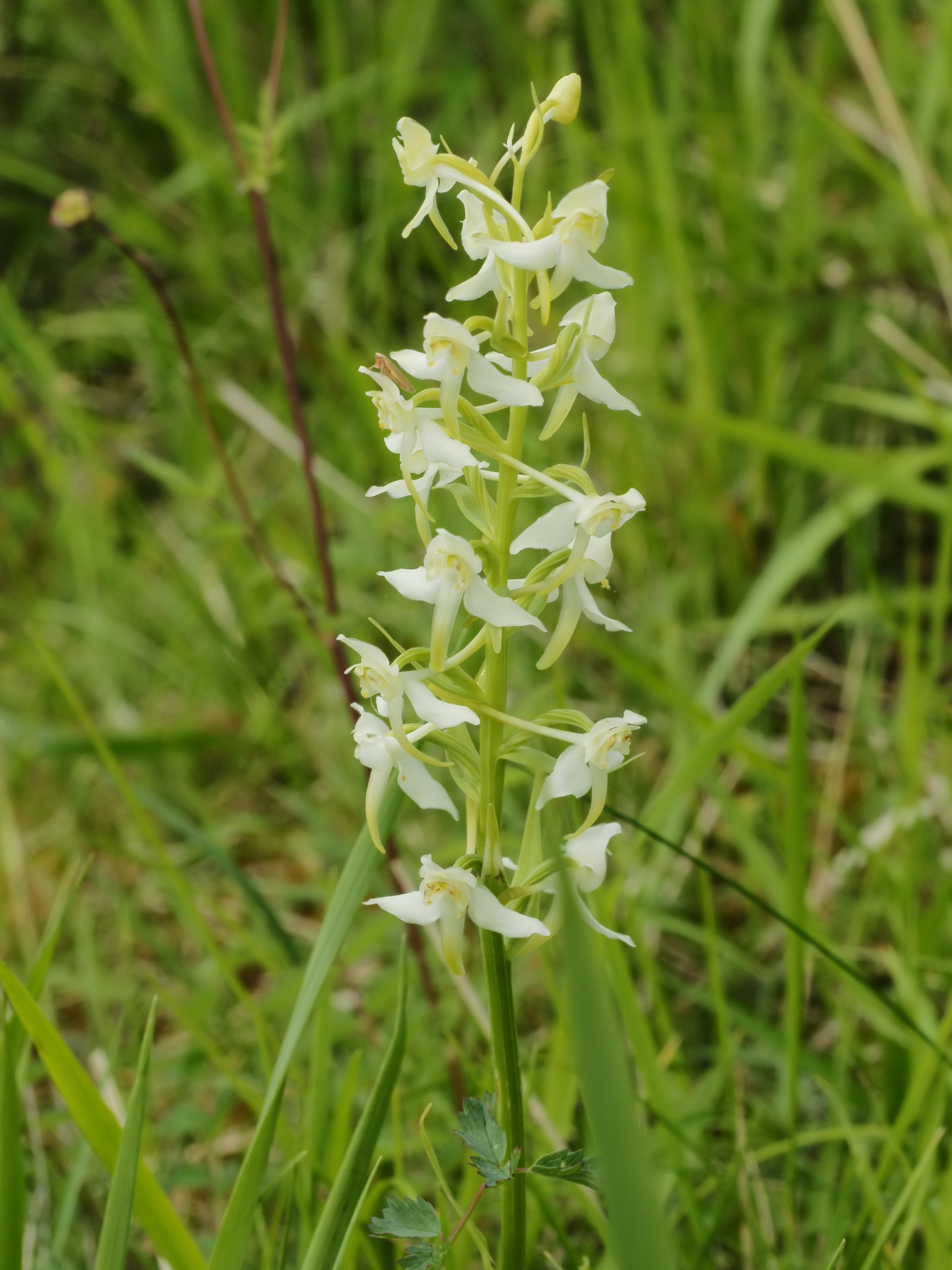
- Example - Greater Butterfly Orchid (Platanthera chlorantha)

- Location within Gloucestershire
- Type: Gloucestershire Wildlife Trust nature reserve
- Location: Forest of Dean edge, Wye Valley, near Tidenham
- Coordinates: 51°41′54.14″N 2°38′9.13″W
- Area: 2 acres (0.81 ha)
- Created: 1986
- Operator: Gloucestershire Wildlife Trust Forestry Commission
- Status: Open all year

East Wood (grid reference SO561001) (west site) and (grid reference SO563001) (east site) is a 0.82-hectare (2.0-acre) nature reserve in Gloucestershire, England. The west site is 0.45-hectare (1.1-acre). The east site is 0.37-hectare (0.91-acre). It is part of a larger area of woodland called East Wood, which is adjacent to Oakhill Wood (to the north west) and Woolaston Wood (east). The site was leased from the Forestry Commission in 1986 and is managed by the Gloucestershire Wildlife Trust. The site is listed in the 'Forest of Dean Local Plan Review' as a Key Wildlife Site (KWS).

== Location and habitat ==
The reserve is on the southern fringe of the Forest of Dean and to the east of the Wye Valley. It consists of two relatively small felled areas which are sited on Carboniferous Drybrook limestone. These are about 220 yards apart with an access track to them. They are between Tidenham and Hewelsfield and lie within a relatively large area of Forestry Commission woodland which is mostly conifers.

In the 1980s the two sites, which comprise this nature reserve, were cleared of soil and scrub. This has exposed the limestone pavements. The clearance is to encourage plants which require this open habitat. The southern area of East Wood is an ancient woodland site and this is shown in the diversity of plants present.

== Flora ==
The richness of the reserve is demonstrated by the recorded species which include Columbine, Greater Butterfly-orchid, Wood Anemone, Bluebell, Yellow Archangel, Primrose, Early Purple Orchid, Cowslip and the Early Dog-violet in the spring. Summer species include Common Milkwort, Oxeye Daisy, Common Knapweed and the Bulbous Buttercup. Also recorded are Foxglove, Rosebay Willowherb and flowerings of the rare Martagon Lily. Ferns grow between the stones such as Black Spleenwort and Hart's-tongue Fern.

There is some Beech woodland in the west site. The sites also support Hawthorn, Hazel, Dogwood and Broom. There are coppicing stumps of Oak, Ash, Field Maple and Birch.

== Historical interest ==
The King Yew, which is considered to be 400 to 500 years old, is sited a few hundred yards to the east of the reserve in Woolaston Wood.

== Conservation ==
The exposures need regular maintenance to keep them clear of invasive species such as Bramble. The areas are being enlarged, but there is a gentle transition between open habitat and the denser, darked conifer woodland.

== Walks ==
There is a publication which details a walk for recreation, observing wildlife and notable views in the Wye Valley.' This includes information on Offa's Dyke Path, the Gloucestershire Way, and includes information on Devil's Pulpit (Tintern), Lippets Grove, Passage Grove, Caswell Woods SSSI, Oakhill Wood, East Wood nature reserve, Ridley Bottom nature reserve, and Poor's Allotment SSSI.

== Publications ==
- Kelham, A, Sanderson, J, Doe, J, Edgeley-Smith, M, et al., 1979, 1990, 2002 editions, 'Nature Reserves of the Gloucestershire Trust for Nature Conservation/Gloucestershire Wildlife Trust'
- ‘Nature Reserve Guide – discover the wild Gloucestershire on your doorstep’ - 50th Anniversary, January 2011, Gloucestershire Wildlife Trust
- 'Where to see Wildlife in the Forest of Dean', January 2012, Gloucestershire Wildlife Trust
- 'Tidenham Wildlife Walk', March 2012, Gloucestershire Wildlife Trust
