= Wyndcliff =

Limestone cliff in Monmouthshire, Wales

Coordinates: 51°40′25″N 2°40′58″W

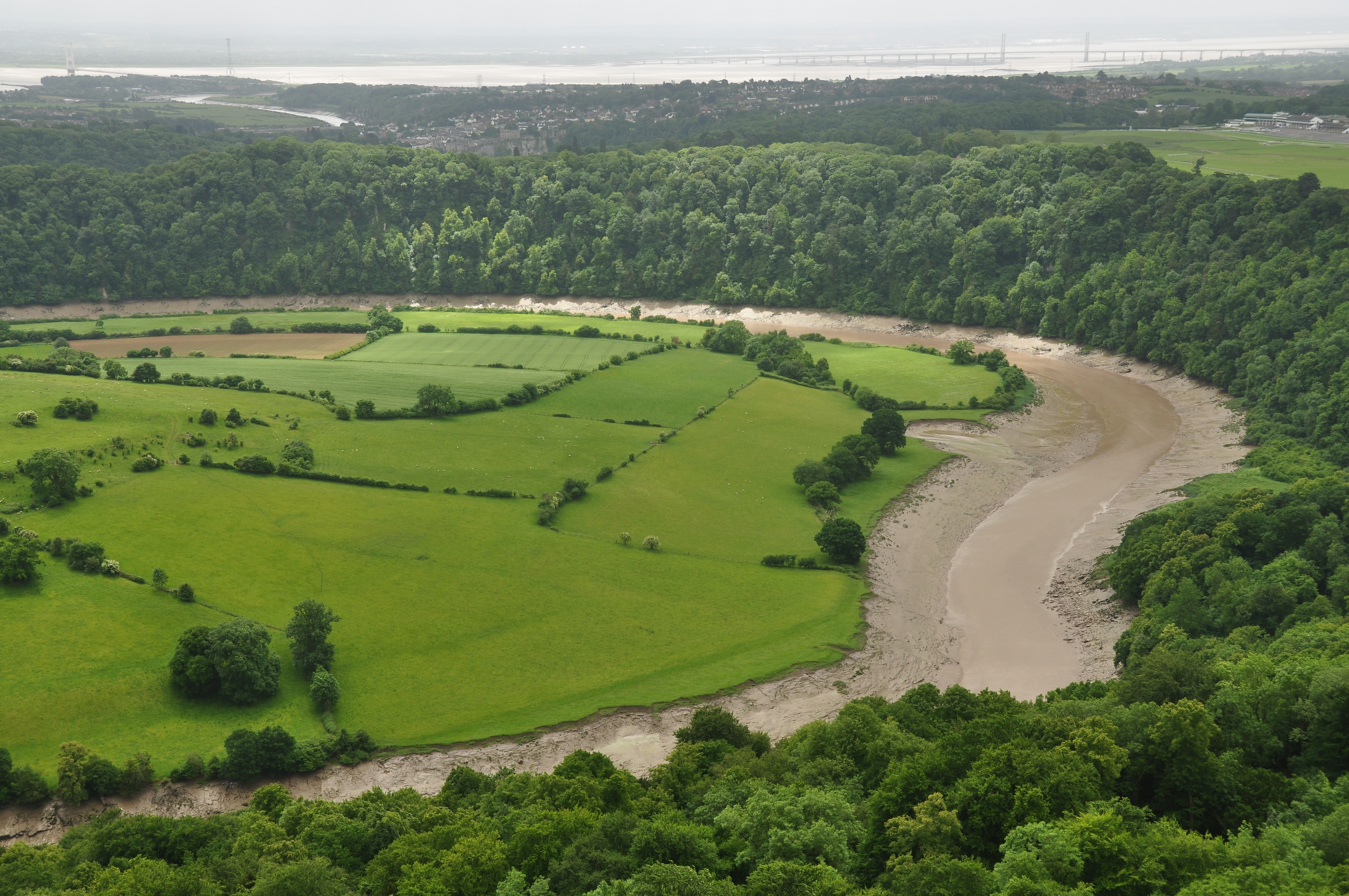
View from the Eagle's Nest at Wyndcliff, looking downstream towards Lancaut, Chepstow, and the Severn estuary

The Wyndcliff or Wynd Cliff (historically sometimes spelt Wyndcliffe) is a steep limestone cliff rising above the western bank of the River Wye in Monmouthshire, Wales, some 1 mile (1.6 km) north-east of the village of St Arvans, 2.5 miles (4.0 km) south of Tintern, and 3.5 miles (5.6 km) north of the town of Chepstow, within the Wye Valley Area of Outstanding Natural Beauty. The cliff rises to 771 feet (235 m) at its summit, the highest point on the Monmouthshire bank of the Wye. The area is traversed by the Wye Valley Walk, and is also a popular venue for rock climbing. Access is provided by the A466 road which passes along the valley immediately below the cliff face.

The site has been appreciated by visitors since the time of the Wye Tour in the late eighteenth and early nineteenth centuries. It contains several viewing points constructed so that visitors can gain a full appreciation of the area's Picturesque landscape, including the Eagle's Nest viewpoint which was built in 1828 for its landowner the Duke of Beaufort as an extension to the walking path network already developed around the nearby Piercefield estate. It has been described as "one of the most impressive viewpoints in the British Isles".

== Name and listing designation ==
According to Joseph Bradney, the location was mentioned by Nennius as Huit gwynt, from the Welsh words Chwyth gwynt meaning "the blowing of the wind", and this gives the origin of the feature's modern name rather than it being derived from the words "Wye" and "cliff". Wyndcliff is listed, jointly with the park at Piercefield House, at Grade I on the Cadw/ICOMOS Register of Parks and Gardens of Special Historic Interest in Wales. Wyndcliff gives its name to Wyndcliffe Court, a country house about 1 kilometre (0.62 mi) to the west of the Eagle's Nest.

== Geology and ecology ==
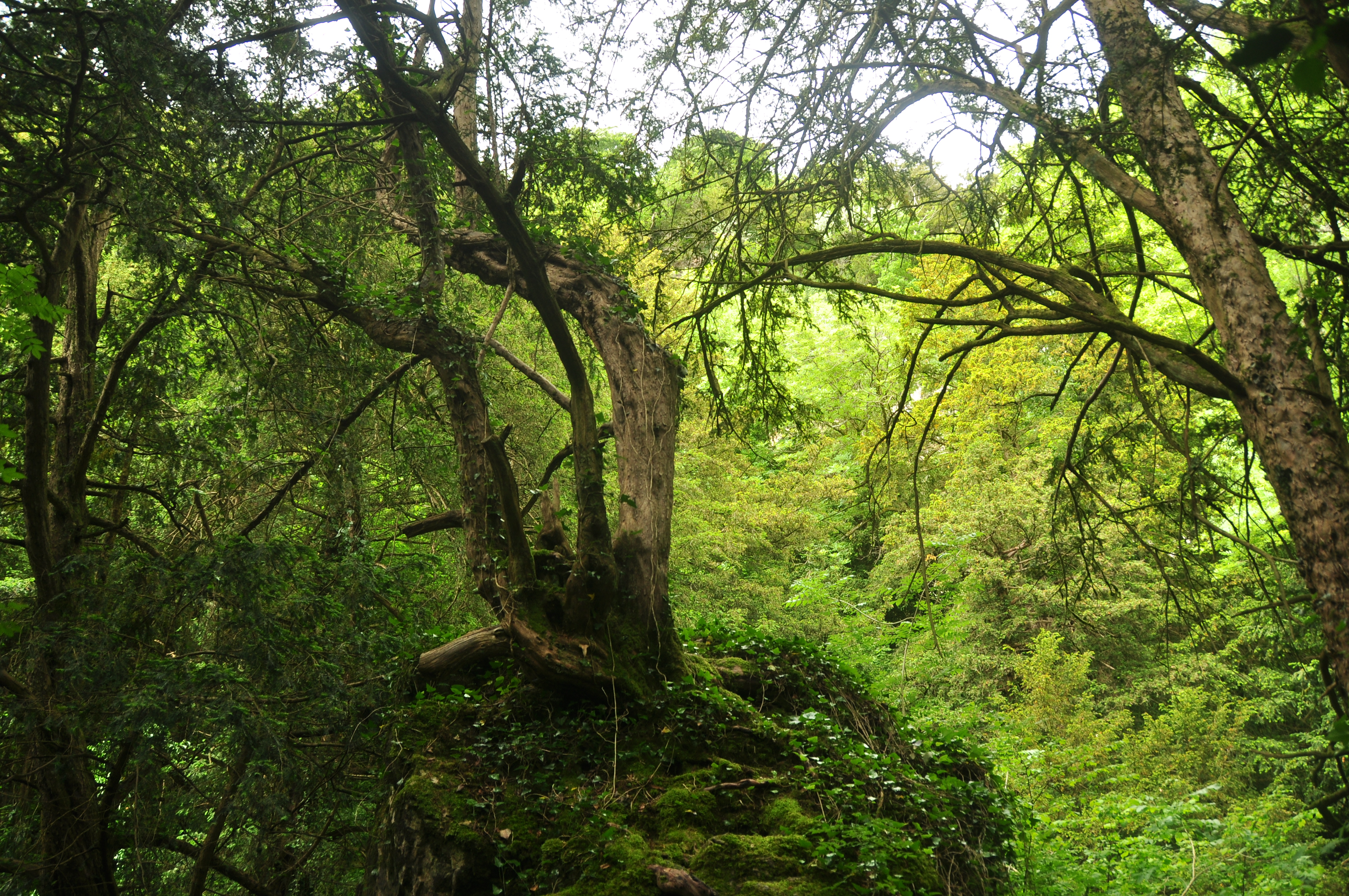
Ancient woodland on the Wyndcliff

Like nearby Black Cliff, the crag is formed from strata of the Black Rock Limestone Subgroup (traditionally referred to as the 'Lower Dolomite'). It sits atop the less competent strata of the Avon Group (traditionally the 'Lower Limestone Shale') which have collapsed under the loading. The broad landslide mass extends to the riverbank. The area is largely covered by formerly coppiced but ancient woodland. Wyndcliff Wood is regarded as a high quality example of gorge woodland, with beech, yew, lime, ash and hazel trees, as well as varieties of whitebeam.

== Viewpoints ==
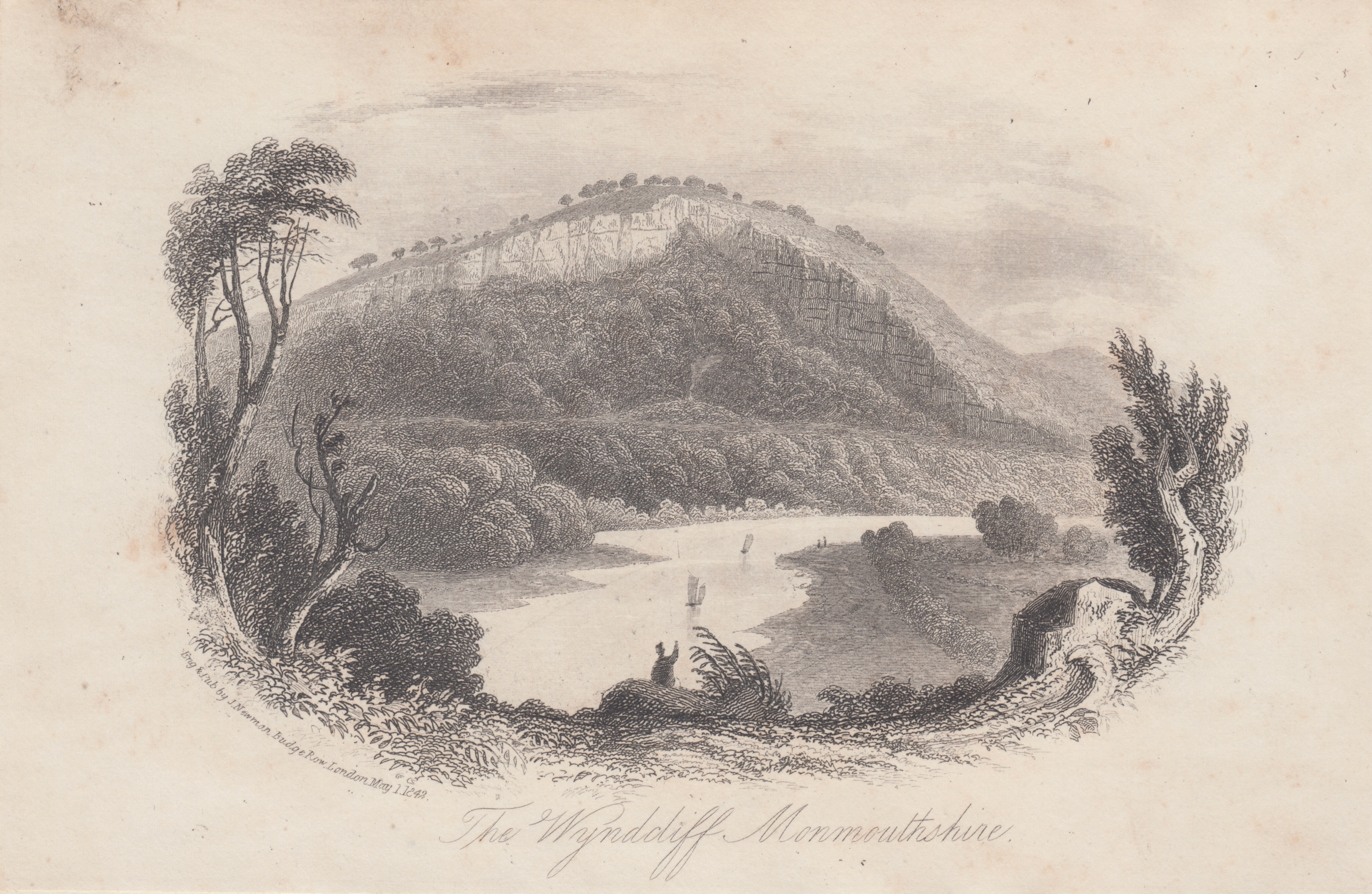
The Wyndcliff (1842)

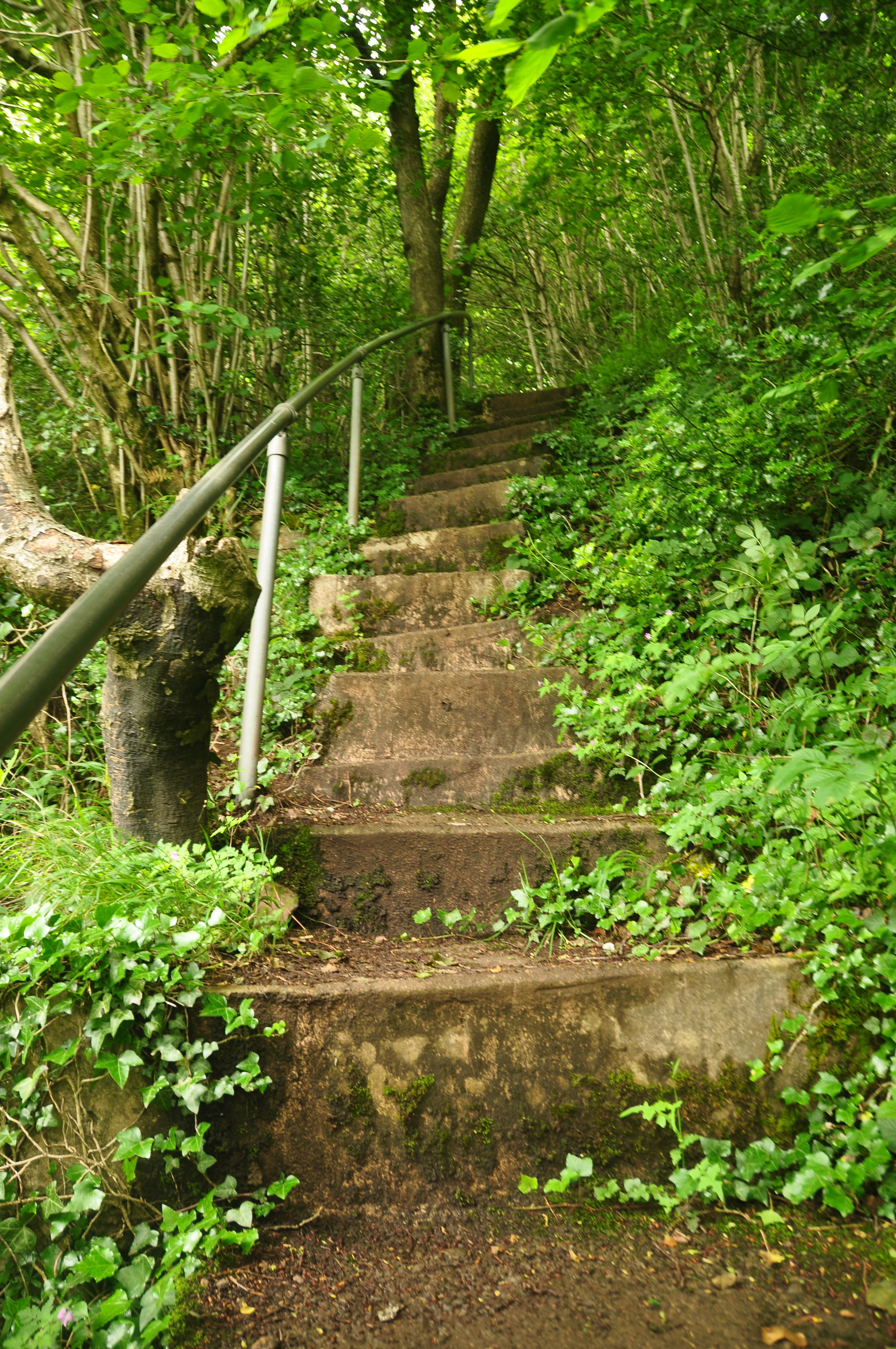
Some of the 365 Steps

Until the nineteenth century, the only access to the site was on foot from the river or from St Arvans (to the west) or Porthcasseg (to the north). From 1824, the building of a new turnpike road between St Arvans and Redbrook allowed greater ease of access to the Wyndcliff area through which the road passed. It became the focus of carriage trips by tourists wishing to see the views, and numbers grew in particular with the establishment of steam packet services between Bristol and Chepstow which allowed day trips to be made.

The Duke of Beaufort, who owned the land, was responsible through his steward Osmond Wyatt for installing a path known as the 365 Steps (though the modern number of steps is closer to 300) from the road to the top of the cliff. There, Wyatt constructed a split-level viewing platform called the Eagle's Nest, in 1828. A small building, Moss Cottage, where refreshments and informal entertainment were provided, was also built beside the path, with a table made from a slab of walnut tree from inside Chepstow Castle. The cottage later fell into disrepair and was demolished in the 1950s. In 1834, there was a proposal to build an observatory on the site, but it was never constructed.

The view from the Eagle's Nest includes the farmland on the opposite bank of the Wye at Lancaut; the cliff face at Wintour's Leap; Chepstow Castle and the adjoining town; the mouth of the Wye at Beachley; the Severn estuary, Severn Bridge and Second Severn Crossing; and the Cotswold Hills beyond. Prince Puckler-Muskau, who visited the Eagle's Nest in 1828, said: "The grouping of this landscape is perfect ... I know of no picture more beautiful." Samuel Taylor Coleridge described the view as "the whole world imaged in its vast circumference". The writer C. J. O. Evans, in the early 1950s, wrote: "In whichever direction the gaze travels, a sublime prospect is unfolded and the claim that nine counties are visible on a clear day is not more enthralling than the grandeur of the face of nature in all its rich variety of scenes so beautifully displayed."

== Leisure ==
The Wye Valley Walk passes through Wyndcliff Wood, and several public footpaths divert from the main path. The area is popular for rock climbing, with a large number of both traditional and sport climbing routes available.

== Access ==
Access to the Wyndcliff is through the Lower Wyndcliff car park on the A466; or the Upper Wyndcliff car park accessed by a lane off the A466 to the east of St Arvans. The latter parking area is close to the Eagle's Nest viewpoint.
