= John Wintour =

John Wintour may refer to:

- John Wintour (Gunpowder Plot) (executed 1606), member of the Gunpowder Plot
- John Winter (Royalist) (c. 1600–1676), ironmaster and landowner
