= NDAC =

NDAC may refer to:

- The U.S. National Defense Advisory Commission of the Office for Emergency Management, set up during the administration of President Franklin D. Roosevelt
- National Diving and Activity Centre, England
- North Dakota Agricultural College, now known as North Dakota State University
- Neodymium acetate, a compound where Nd is neodymium and Ac is a trivial symbol for acetate.
