= Woodcroft, Gloucestershire =

Village in Gloucestershire, England

Coordinates: 51.66029°N 2.66269°W

Woodcroft
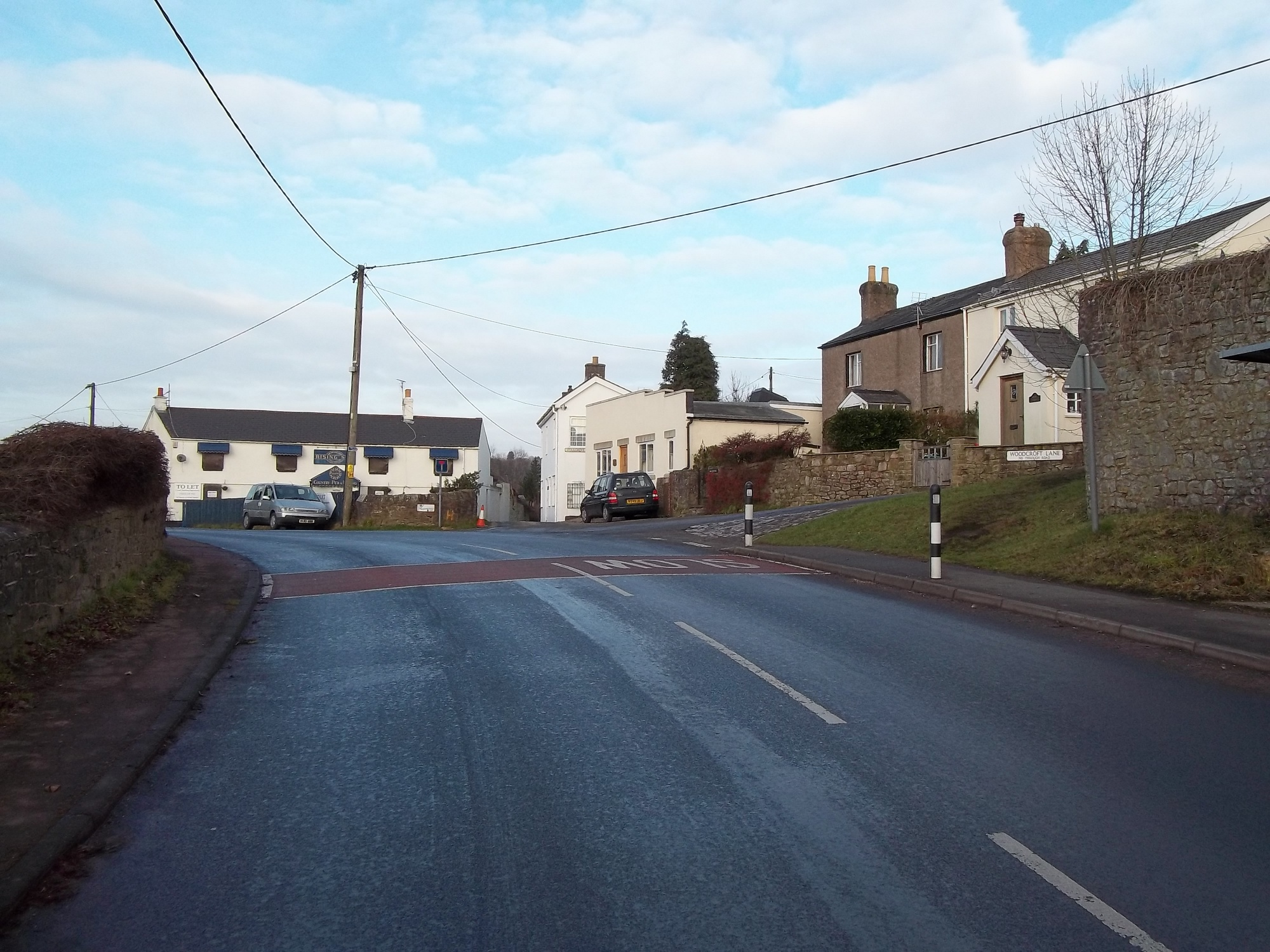

- Location within Gloucestershire
- Population: 284
- OS grid reference: ST542959
- District: Forest of Dean
- Shire county: Gloucestershire
- Region: South West
- Country: England
- Sovereign state: United Kingdom
- Post town: CHEPSTOW
- Postcode district: NP16
- Dialling code: 01291
- Police: Gloucestershire
- Fire: Gloucestershire
- Ambulance: South Western

Woodcroft is a small village in the Forest of Dean district of Gloucestershire, England. It is located on the eastern bank of the River Wye, opposite Piercefield House, two miles north of the Welsh town of Chepstow. The village is immediately north of Tutshill, within the parish of Tidenham. The population in 2011 was 284.

== History ==
Woodcroft was originally common land in "Bishton tithing" to the south of Tidenham Chase. Powder House Farm standing east of the road between Tutshill and Woodcroft was one of the farm-houses on the Tidenham manor estate in 1769 and was a stone house with a thatched roof in 1813. At least one cottage had been built on the common east of the road at Woodcroft by 1712, and by 1815 there was a small settlement of six or seven cottages.

Woodcroft became a sizable hamlet by the end of the 19th century with cottages, somewhat scattered, covering much of the area of the former common, and some more widely spaced along the road to the north. In the mid-20th century numbers of detached houses were built along the road running northwards from Woodcroft and up onto the former chase, their owners attracted by the views over the River Severn to the east and the River Wye to the west.

In the 1870s Sophia Morgan of Tidenham House was organizing evangelical services with coffee at a building in Woodcroft, partly in an attempt to combat drunkenness among the Irish labourers building the Wye Valley Railway. The Memorial Temperance Hall, a two-story stone building erected at Woodcroft by Christiana Morgan in 1887 in memory of her husband T. H. Morgan, was used for religious services, coffee rooms, and reading rooms, etc.

== Features ==
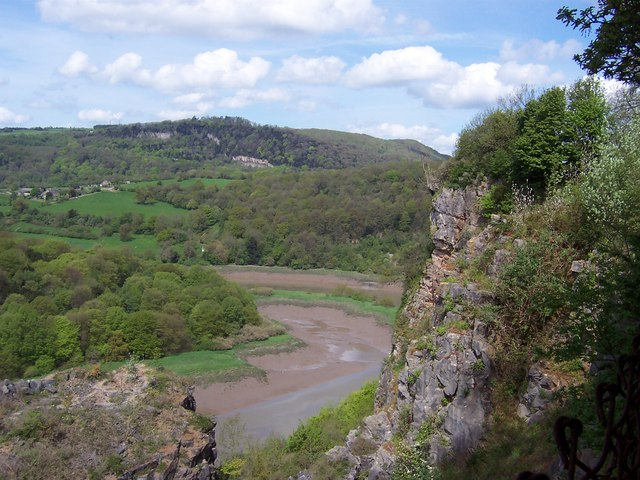
General view of Wintour's Leap, overlooking the River Wye at Woodcroft

One of the main attractions in the area is Gloucestershire Wildlife Trust's Lancaut Nature Reserve. Within the SSSI Nature Reserve is a cliff face called Wintour's Leap, enjoyed by walkers, naturalists and rock climbers. Access to cliffs is by permission of the Gloucestershire Wildlife Trust managed in conjunction with the British Mountaineering Council for rock climbing The reserve provides important nesting habitat for peregrine falcons that enjoy commanding views over the Wye Valley. The village straddles the boundary of the Wye Valley Area of Outstanding Natural Beauty, and the Offa's Dyke Path passes through it.
