= Lippets Grove =

Nature reserve in Gloucestershire, England

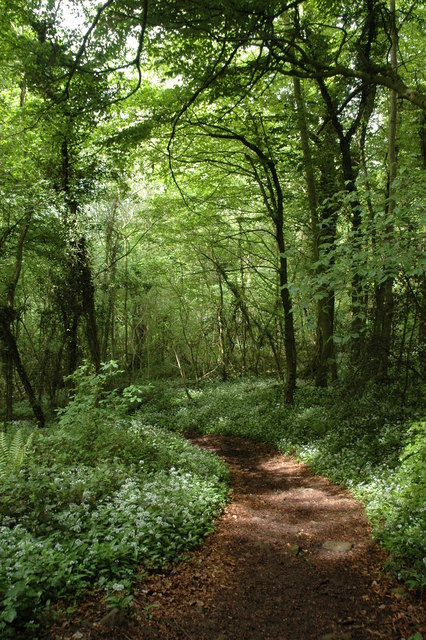
- Footpath near Lippets Grove

- Location within Gloucestershire
- Type: Gloucestershire Wildlife Trust reserve
- Location: Wye Valley AONB, near Brockweir
- Coordinates: 51°41′50.3″N 2°39′58.46″W
- Area: 12.3 acres (5.0 ha)
- Created: 1987
- Operator: Gloucestershire Wildlife Trust Forestry Commission
- Status: Open all year

Lippets Grove (grid reference SO540000) is a 5-hectare (12-acre) nature reserve in Gloucestershire. The site was leased from the Forestry Commission in 1987 and is managed by the Gloucestershire Wildlife Trust. The site is listed in the 'Forest of Dean Local Plan Review' as a Key Wildlife Site (KWS).

== Location and access ==
The reserve is in the Wye Valley Area of Outstanding Natural Beauty and is half a mile south of Brockweir. It is adjacent to the Shorn Cliff And Caswell Woods SSSI. It is part of an extensive area of ancient woodland which includes Caswell Wood and Passage Grove. The Offa's Dyke Path passes below the northern and western boundaries of the nature reserve and is the means of access to the reserve. The reserve is on Black Rock Dolomite limestone and is a flat area.

== Significant interest ==
The site is considered to be the best site in the county for the Martagon Lily, which is a naturalised plant and is uncommon in Gloucestershire. The plant grows throughout the reserve and is mentioned in the Natural England citation for Shorn Cliff and Caswell Woods.

== Plants ==
The nature reserve in spring supports Wood Anemone, Cuckooflower, Bluebell, Ramsons, Herb-Paris and frequent Toothwort which is parasitic on the mature hazel coppice.

== Woodland management ==
The Forestry Commission replanted the grove in 1966. The grove was previously an area of coppicing (as are many of the woods in the Wye Valley). The replanting consisted of Beech and Corsican Pine. Since that time natural loss has encouraged replacement with Ash, Wild Cherry, Silver Birch and Sycamore. Some of this has been coppice regeneration. There is a varied shrub underlayer which includes Goat Willow, Elder and Hazel, with plentiful Traveller's-joy

== Conservation ==
A high forest canopy and limited scrub were originally considered to be the best conditions to support and to spread the Martagon Lily. The management programme now looks to release the derelict coppice by removal of the crowded Corsican pines. Lily Beetle and browsing Fallow Deer have been noted as the biggest hindrance to Martagon Lily, which despite this, is still found in good numbers.

== Walks ==
There is a publication which details a walk for recreation, observing wildlife and notable views in the Wye Valley. This includes information on Offa's Dyke Path, the Gloucestershire Way, and includes information on Devil's Pulpit (Tintern), Lippets Grove, Passage Grove, Caswell Woods SSSI, Oakhill Wood, East Wood nature reserve, Ridley Bottom nature reserve, and Poor's Allotment SSSI.

== Publications ==
- Kelham, A, Sanderson, J, Doe, J, Edgeley-Smith, M, et al., 1979, 1990, 2002 editions, 'Nature Reserves of the Gloucestershire Trust for Nature Conservation/Gloucestershire Wildlife Trust'
- ‘Nature Reserve Guide – discover the wild Gloucestershire on your doorstep’ - 50th Anniversary, January 2011, Gloucestershire Wildlife Trust
- 'Tidenham Wildlife Walk', March 2012, Gloucestershire Wildlife Trust
