= Slaughter Stream Cave =

Cave system in Berry Hill, England

Slaughter Stream Cave / Wet Sink
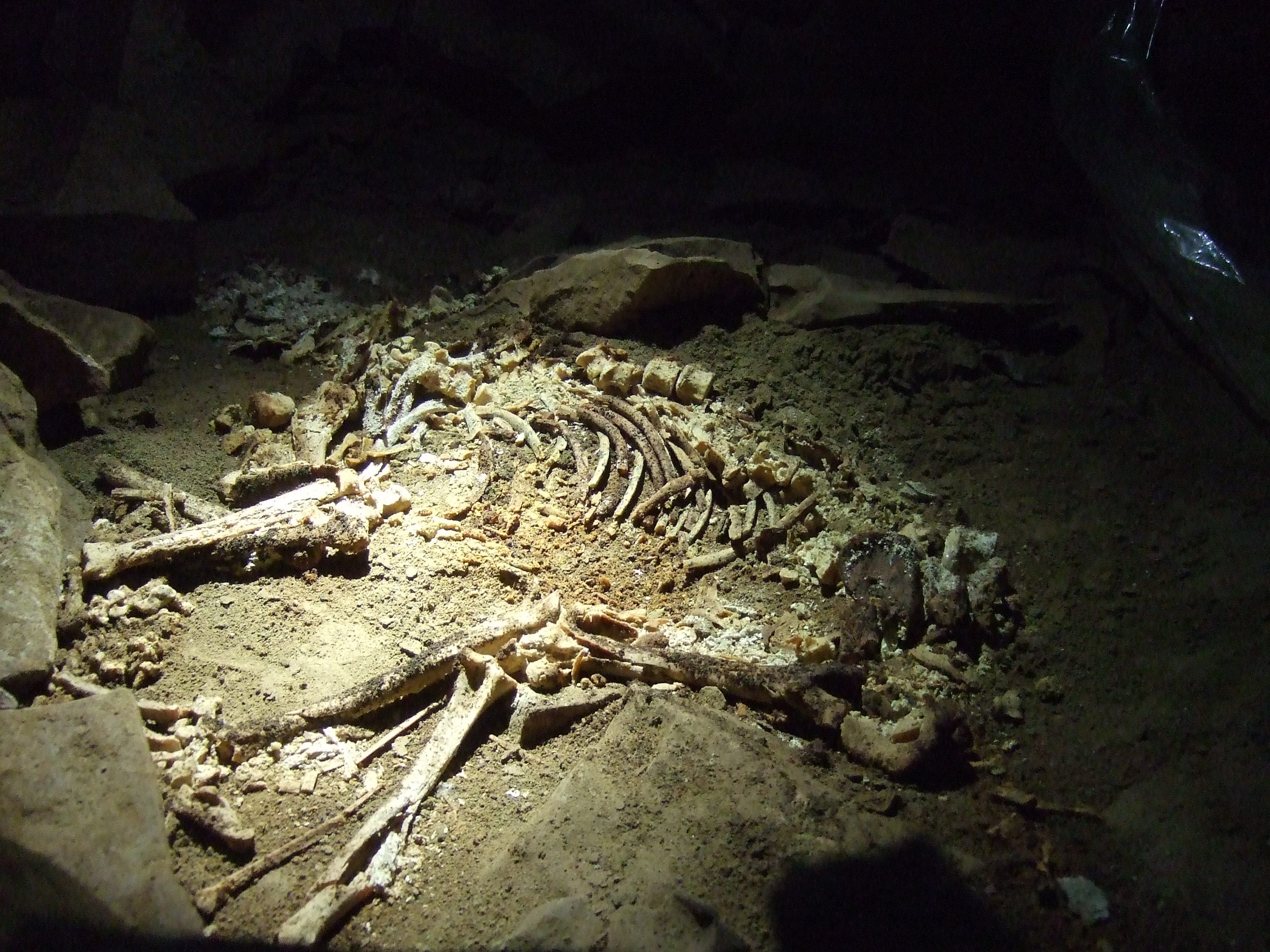
- Skeleton in dog Graveyard Passage

- Location within Gloucestershire
- Location: Berry Hill, Forest of Dean, United Kingdom
- Coordinates: 51°49′15″N 2°36′28″W
- Depth: 100 m (330 ft)
- Length: 13 kilometres (8.1 mi)
- Geology: Limestone
- Entrances: 1
- Difficulty: Grade 3. Mainly walking passage, some crawling/stooping. Some easy single rope technique (SRT).
- Hazards: Sewage discharge into streamway
- Access: Gated. Key and permit required. Contact RFDCC.

Slaughter Stream Cave, also known as Wet Sink, is a cave system in the Wye Valley, Forest of Dean.

A series of fixed ladders and two pitches lead to sporting streamways, sandy crawls and fossil passages. The cave also contains some interesting archaeological finds, many historic bones were found in the cave – the most prominent of which is 'Norman', a dog who was trapped in the cave many years ago and whose footprints and skeleton can be seen in Dog's Graveyard passage.

An episode of the Channel 4 documentary Extreme Archaeology was filmed in this cave.

It is the longest cave system in the Forest of Dean followed by Miss Grace's Lane.

== Description ==
=== Entrance series ===
The cave requires ladder and line or single rope technique (SRT) kits — a single 50 metres (160 ft) rope and 6 maillons/krabs is recommended.

A wide variety of trips are possible, this is a good cave to visit in lieu of nearby Otter Hole when the sump is closed. The entrance is vertical, but fixed ladders are installed. After the ladders a short crawl through a precarious boulder choke (take care not to touch the scaffolding) leads to a concreted climb down with a scaffold bar sticking out of it. There is a p-hanger on the right at the bottom of this climb for a traverse line to the next climb. This next climb, although only around 4 metres (13 ft), is p-hangered and should be rigged; several accidents have occurred here, and less confident climbers should treat it like a pitch. The climb leads down to a large ledge, and a 10 metres (33 ft) pitch. SRT kits can be left at the bottom of this pitch. After a further 4 metres (13 ft) climb down the passage closes down into a crawl, in which the roar of the streamway can be heard. Once you meet the water continue along the streamway to enter the main section of the cave. Care should be taken not to swallow any water in the streamway as sewage is discharged into it.
