= Piercefield House =

Neoclassical country house in Wales

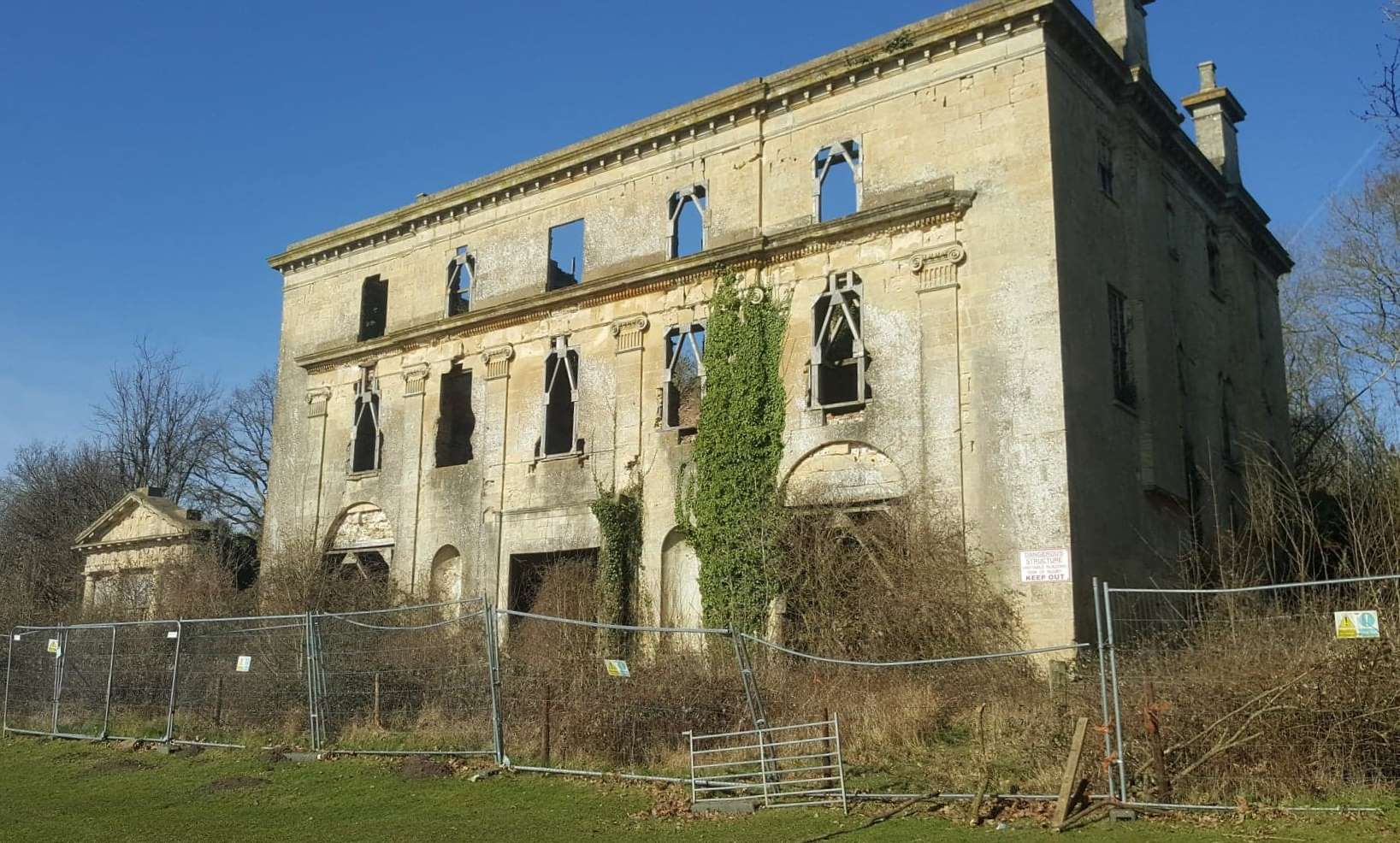
- The ruined Piercefield House in 2021

- Location within Monmouthshire
- 51.6579°N 2.6836°W
- Type: House
- Location: St Arvans, Monmouthshire

History
- Built: 1792–1799
- Built for: George Smith – (Central block) / Colonel Mark Wood – (Pavilions)

Site notes
- Architect: Sir John Soane (Pevsner) or George Vaughan Maddox (Cadw) – (Central block) / Joseph Bonomi the Elder – (Pavilions)
- Architectural style: Neoclassical
- Governing body: Privately owned

Listed Building – Grade II*
- Official name: Ruins of Piercefield House (Central Block)
- Designated: 14 February 2001
- Reference no.: 2013

Listed Building – Grade II*
- Official name: Ruins of Piercefield House, Left Hand or West Pavilion
- Designated: 14 February 2001
- Reference no.: 24754

Listed Building – Grade II*
- Official name: Ruins of Piercefield House, Right Hand or East Pavilion
- Designated: 14 February 2001
- Reference no.: 24755

Cadw/ICOMOS Register of Parks and Gardens of Special Historic Interest in Wales
- Official name: Piercefield and the Wyndcliff
- Designated: 1 February 2022
- Reference no.: PGW(Gt)40(Mon)
- Listing: Grade I

Piercefield House is a largely ruined neo-classical country house near St Arvans, Monmouthshire, Wales, about 1.5 miles (2.4 km) north of the centre of Chepstow. The central block of the house was designed in the very late 18th century, by, or to the designs of, Sir John Soane. It is flanked by two pavilions, of slightly later date, by Joseph Bonomi the Elder. The house sits within Piercefield Park, a Grade I listed historic landscape, that was created in the 18th century as a notable Picturesque estate.

The estate has links to colonialism and slavery. After long ownership by the Walter family, in 1740 it was bought by Valentine Morris, a slaver and planter from Antigua. His son, also Valentine, developed the park and grounds into one of the 18th century’s most famous Picturesque landscapes. His prodigality ruined him, and the estate was sold to a banker, George Smith, who began the present house. He was in turn bankrupted and Piercefield was bought by Sir Mark Wood, a nabob who had made his fortune in Bengal. In 1802, the estate was bought by Nathaniel Wells, son of William Wells, a slaver from Saint Kitts, and Juggy, later Joardine Wells, his enslaved house servant. Nathaniel and his mother both received their freedom and he inherited the bulk of his father’s wealth. Establishing himself at Piercefield, Nathaniel Wells became, in turn, a Justice of the Peace, a Lieutenant in the Chepstow Yeomanry, and deputy lieutenant and high sheriff of Monmouthshire, a notable series of firsts, or near firsts, for a black man in Georgian England. In 1861 the Estate was purchased by Henry Clay, a banker and brewer from Burton-on-Trent.

The house is now a shell, along with its extensive stable block, but its status as a Grade II* listed building reflects its importance. It is currently owned by the Reuben brothers, London-based property developers. A campaign to save and restore the building was launched by SAVE Britain's Heritage in 2013. The house has been repeatedly marketed for sale since the early 2000s but no sale has been concluded. Despite emergency stabilising work in 2008/9, the condition of the house continues to deteriorate.

== History ==
=== 18th–19th centuries ===
Records since the 14th century refer variously to Peerfield, Peersfield, Persfield and Piersfield, the area taking its name, according to some sources, from the nearby manor of St Pierre. The land was owned by the influential Walter family from medieval times until the 18th century. Local historians report an enlargement of the existing house in the 1630s under John Walter (the Sheriff of Monmouthshire in 1629), and a later extension around 1700 is believed to have been the work of the architect William Talman, also responsible for Chatsworth House.

In 1727, the estate was sold for £3,366, 5.6d to Thomas Rous of Wotton-under-Edge. His son then sold it again in 1740, for £8,250, to Colonel Valentine Morris. Morris (c 1678–1743) was born in Antigua, the son of a slave owner, sugar planter and merchant. The estate was inherited by his son, also Valentine Morris (1727–1789), who began living at Piercefield with his family in 1753. At this time, the Piercefield estate was predominantly farmland and tourism to the Wye Valley was in its infancy. Morris, working with Richard Owen Cambridge, landscaped the grounds around the house in the style of Capability Brown. The work was largely undertaken by architect Charles Howells and builder William Knowles of Chepstow, who had also undertaken work at nearby Tintern for the Duke of Beaufort. Piercefield was developed into a park of national reputation, as one of the earliest examples of picturesque landscaping. Morris laid out walks through the woodland, and included a grotto, druid's temple, bathing house and giant's cave. He also developed viewpoints along the clifftop above the River Wye, and opened the park up to visitors. One of the many tourists to marvel at this view was the poet Coleridge, who wrote: "Oh what a godly scene....The whole world seemed imaged in its vast circumference". The scientist and traveller Joseph Banks wrote: "I am more and more convinced that it is far the most beautiful place I ever saw".

In the 1770s Valentine Morris's gambling, business and political dealings bankrupted him, and he was forced to leave Piercefield for the West Indies. (Note: Morris's fortunes revived in Antigua, until its seizure by the French. Again heavily indebted, and with his wife insane, Morris was incarcerated in a debtors' prison.) In 1785, Piercefield was sold again, for £26,200, to George Smith, a Durham banker, father of the linguist Elizabeth. Smith continued to open the walks, but straightened some of them. He also commissioned a young architect, John Soane to design a new mansion in the neo-classical style, which would incorporate Morris's house. Work began in 1792, and the new three-storey stone building had reached roof level when the Monmouthshire Bank, which Smith had helped found, failed and he became bankrupt. His creditors sold Piercefield in 1794 to Colonel Mark Wood, Member of Parliament for Newark-on-Trent, who continued and modified the work with architect Joseph Bonomi, incorporating a Doric portico and wings, and commissioning the long stone wall which runs along the western edge of the estate. Wood was also the owner of Llanthony Priory. In 1798, the Chepstow Volunteer Cavalry was raised as part of the war effort against Napoleon, and received their standard at Piercefield from Mrs Wood.

In 1802, Wood in turn sold the house and estate to the planter and slave owner Nathaniel Wells. Wells was born in St Kitts, the son of William Wells, a sugar merchant and planter originally from Cardiff, and Juggy, one of his house slaves. With his inherited fortune, Wells continued to add to the Piercefield estate until it reached almost 3,000 acres (12 km^{2}). In 1818 he became Britain's only known black sheriff when he was appointed Sheriff of Monmouthshire. Wells put the estate up for sale in 1825 after discovering dry rot, but it failed to sell. The number of tourists in the area increased considerably after the opening of the new Wye valley turnpike road in the mid-1820s, and thereafter Wells only lived at Piercefield intermittently, at times letting it out to tenants.

It is rumoured that Admiral Nelson spent a night at Piercefield House on one of his visits to Monmouthshire. Nelson was closely connected to the town of Monmouth through his mistress Lady Hamilton. It is possible that he stayed in the summer of 1802 with her and her elderly husband Sir William Hamilton, on a journey to a friend's Pembrokeshire estate via Monmouth and Kymin Hill.

A splendid seat, the views are remarkably magnificent, and embrace numerous reaches of the Wye, the Severn, and a great range of the surrounding country. The mansion, situated on an eminence, in the midst of fine plantations, is a superb elevation of freestone, consisting of a centre and two wings, and much admired for its tasteful architecture.

— Samuel Lewis describing Piercefield in his Topographical Dictionary of England (1848)

Wells left the area in the 1840s and his tenants closed the walks to the public. In the late 1840s the estate was leased to John Russell (1788–1873) the coal and ironmaster (appointed High Sheriff of Monmouthshire in 1855), who owned the neighbouring estate of Wyelands. In 1856, following Nathaniel Wells' death in 1852, Russell purchased the estate. The walks were occasionally reopened to the public, but for a charge. Around this time suggestions were made in the national press that the estate would be a suitable residence for the Prince of Wales. However, following the explosion at his Risca Blackvein Colliery, Russell sold the estate in 1861 to Henry Clay, a banker and brewer from Burton-on-Trent. In 1863, Piercefield was the site of a parade and mock battle between volunteers from Monmouthshire and Gloucestershire recruited in the patriotic fervour after the Crimean War; the exercise involved some 1,500 troops and was watched by a crowd of at least 12,000. In 1874 the estate passed to Clay's eldest son, also Henry Clay, who lived there until his death in 1921 aged 96. In 1882, a cricket match took place at Piercefield between a Chepstow and District team and an England eleven including E. M. Grace; the Chepstow team won.

=== 20th and 21st centuries ===
Henry Clay's son, (Henry) Hastings Clay (1864–1943), was 57 when his father died, so he already had a home of his own, at Wyndcliffe Court. Piercefield House had no bathrooms, and would have been very expensive to bring up-to-date. Just after the end of the First World War, money was tight, and taxes were high. And there were death duties to pay, so he stripped the house of "anything valuable" such as the Adam fireplaces, and most went to America. In 1925 he sold the house and much of the estate to the Chepstow Racecourse Company, of which the directors were all members of the Clay family. The new racecourse on the estate was opened in 1926. The house, already in a poor state of repair, was abandoned and stripped, gradually decaying to its current ruinous condition, with just the main walls still standing. During World War II the area was used by US forces training before the Normandy landings and the house was damaged during live fire exercises. (Note: John Newman considers the claim that the house was used for target practice to be apocryphal.) The woods overlooking the river became established as a nature reserve, and footpaths which now form part of the Wye Valley Walk were reopened in the 1970s. Plans to develop the site as a hotel or outdoor pursuits centre have so far been unfulfilled, with emergency repairs to the house carried out in 2008–09.

The estate was put up for sale in October 2005 with Jackson-Stops for an asking price of £2 million. It came into the possession of David and Simon Reuben in 2006 through their ownership of Northern Racing. All subsequent attempts at marketing have failed to conclude a sale and the condition of the house continues to deteriorate. In July 2013, a campaign was launched by Marcus Binney of SAVE Britain's Heritage to seek protection for the building.

The park has been the site for the Green Gathering, an environmental festival, since 2011.

== Architecture and description ==
The available sources agree that George Smith commissioned designs for rebuilding from Sir John Soane in 1784–85. (Note: Ivor Waters, in his study The Unfortunate Valentine Morris, published in 1964, records that 20 designs for the house, some of them showing a completely new building, and some showing elements of the earlier structure incorporated into the new house, are held at Sir John Soane’s Museum in London.) The architectural historian John Newman suggests that Soane produced further designs, for a completely new house, in 1792 and that construction commenced, to this design, in 1793. Cadw disagrees, contending that the new building, begun in the late 1780s, was undertaken under the direction of George Vaughan Maddox. Cadw's designation report acknowledges that the design was "very dependent on Soane's ideas" and closely followed his design for Shotesham Park, Norfolk, which was built between 1785 and 1788. The central block is a Grade II* listed building. There is agreement that the West and East pavilions, which flank the main mansion, were undertaken to the designs of Joseph Bonomi the Elder for the new owner, Colonel Wood, in 1795 to 1799. Both the West and East pavilions are also listed structures, at Grade II*.

The house comprises the central block, with two flanking wings. The walls are of brick, externally faced with limestone ashlar. The pavilions were originally joined to the main house by corridors but these have been demolished. Both pavilions were built in the form of Greek temples and were originally surmounted by statues. The main house was of two full storeys, with an attic tier above, five bays, and a porch with Doric columns added by Bonomi. Internally, Newman records traces of masonry which indicate that the new house incorporated elements of the earlier, original building. William Coxe, in the second of his two-volume journal, An Historical Tour in Monmouthshire, published in 1801, gave a detailed description of the interior layout. The saloon, through which the house was entered, was an "oblong octagon". A "grand" staircase led to the upper floor. Either side of the saloon were the withdrawing room and the dining room. These led to the breakfast and billiard rooms, which were linked to the pavilions that housed the library and the music room, through corridors which Coxe describes as conservatories. When Coxe visited in 1799, he recorded the internal decoration as being in an "unfinished state". (Note: A chimneypiece from Piercefield is now held in the collection of the Philadelphia Museum of Art.)

Other listed structures within the estate include: the Lion Gates and lodges, formerly the main gateway into the Piercefield estate and which now form the entrance to Chepstow Racecourse; two milestones set into the estate wall; the entrance gates and gatepiers at Middle Lodge; Cliff Lodge; the Temple Doors gate; the walled garden, bothies and cottage; a barn and byre; and a dam.

== Piercefield Park ==
The Royal Commission on the Ancient and Historical Monuments of Wales describe the park at Piercefield as "the par excellence outstanding example of an early sublime landscape". Developed initially by Valentine Morris and subsequently by George Smith, it became a key feature of the Wye Tour. Such tours began in the mid-18th century and reached their peak during the later 18th and early 19th centuries, when the French Revolution and the Napoleonic Wars restricted travel to Continental Europe. Their popularity was confirmed in the account of a tour undertaken in 1770 by William Gilpin, a founder of the Picturesque movement. He wrote of Piercefield; "Mr Morris's improvements are generally thought as much worth a traveller's notice as anything on the banks of the Wye". On his visit in 1760, when the first iteration of the park was largely complete, Edward Knight, cousin of another devotee of the picturesque, Richard Payne Knight, recorded twenty-six structures in the park, including a Chinese Bridge, a Druid's Temple and a tower. By the time of Coxe's tour, some forty years later, only nine remained.

The views created were not universally admired. The River Wye is tidal at Lancaut, leading to the deposit of mudflats. Francis Kilvert, who visited in 1875, disliked the result; "I was disappointed in the famous view of the Wynd Cliff…any view would be spoilt by the filthy ditch which they call the Wye, a scene of ugly foreshore and wastes of hideous mud banks with a sluggish brown stream winding low in the bottom".

Piercefield Park is listed, jointly with the Wyndcliff, at Grade I on the Cadw/ICOMOS Register of Parks and Gardens of Special Historic Interest in Wales. A number of features within the park and grounds are scheduled monuments. These include the Cold Bath, the Alcove, the Giant's Cave, the Platform, and the Grotto.

== Gallery ==
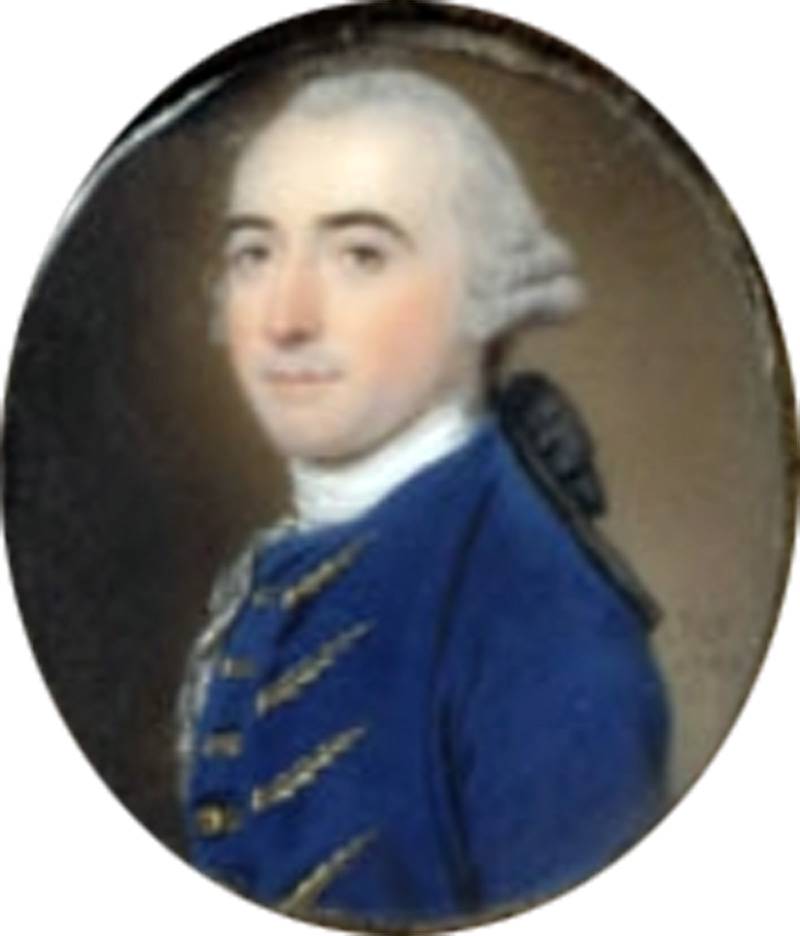
Valentine Morris circa 1765

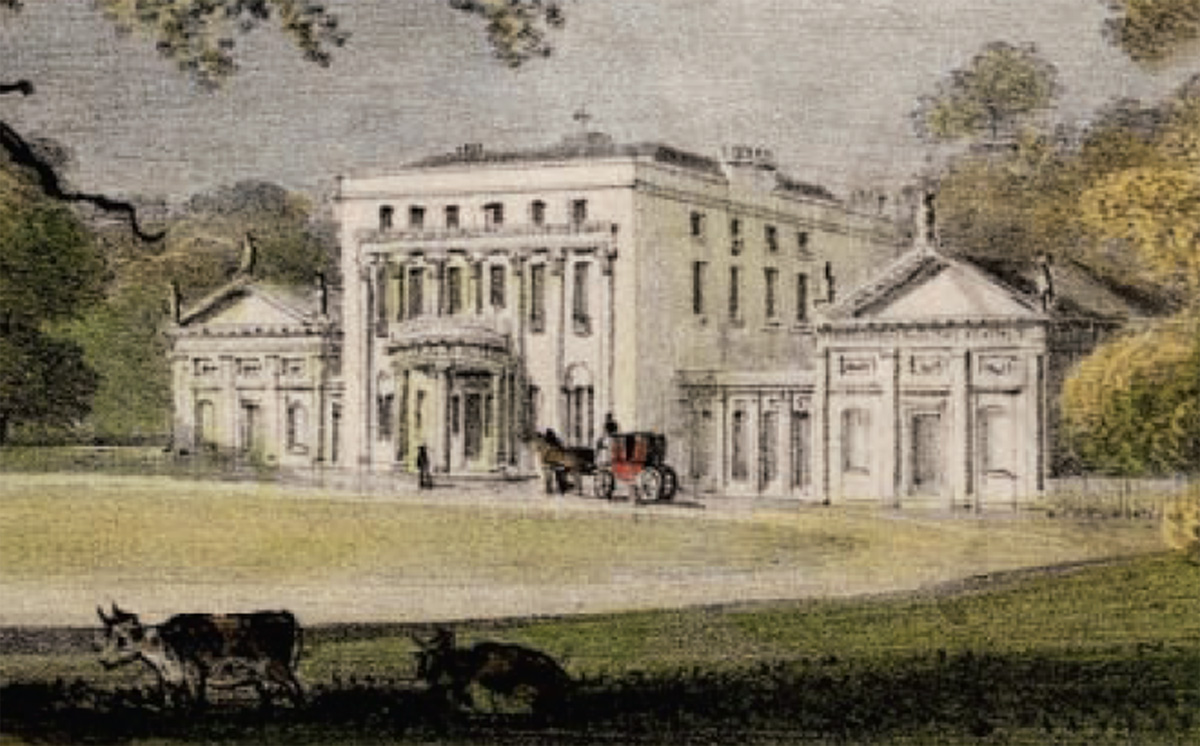
Piercefield House circa 1840 from a painting by George Eyre Brooks

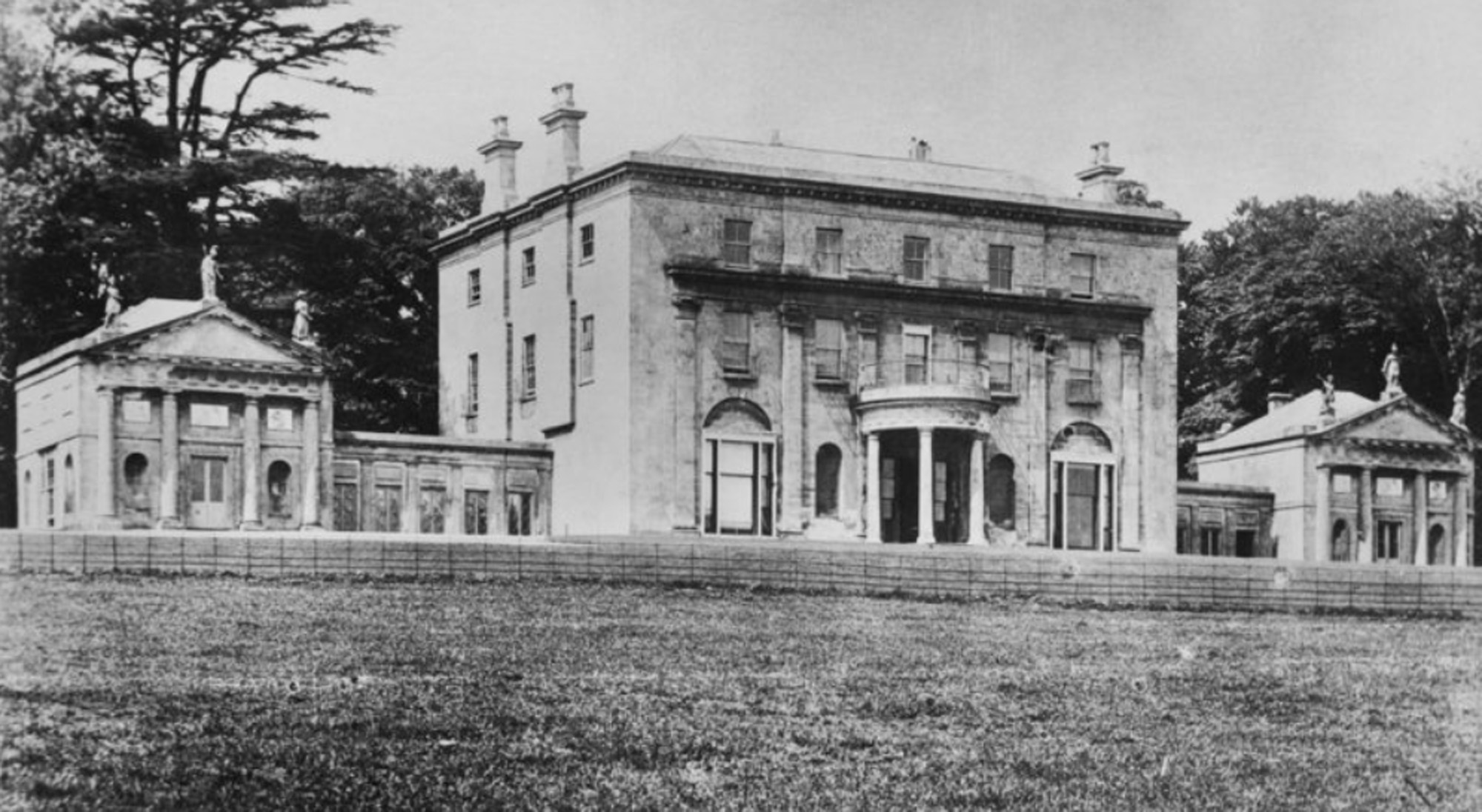
Piercefield House circa 1920

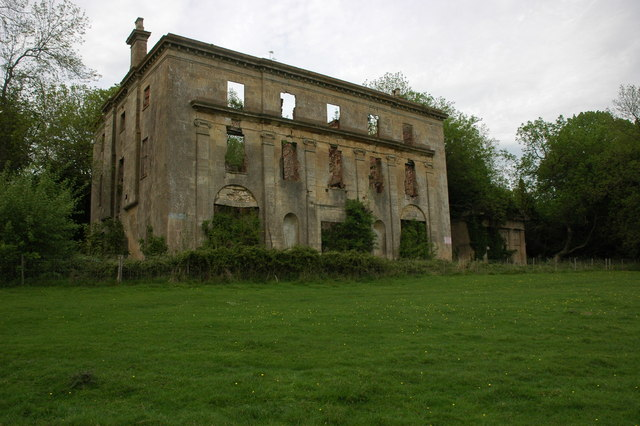
The central block

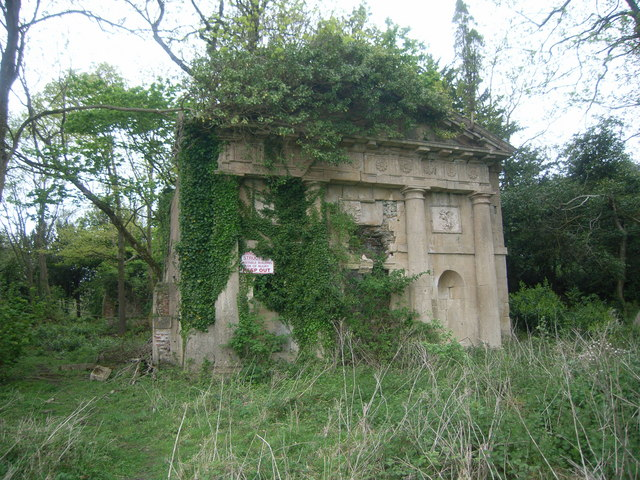
East pavilion

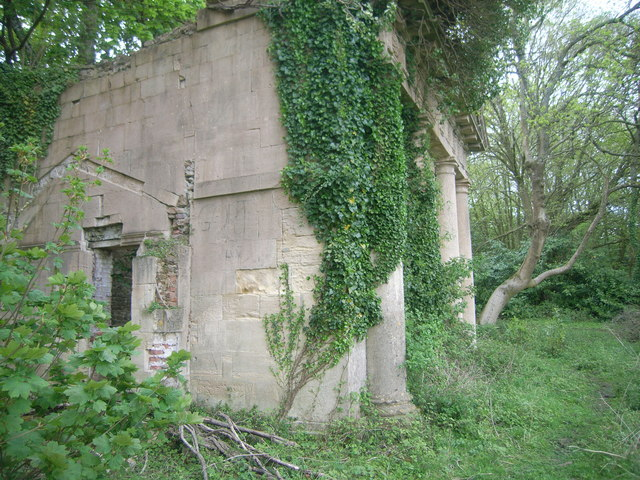
West pavilion

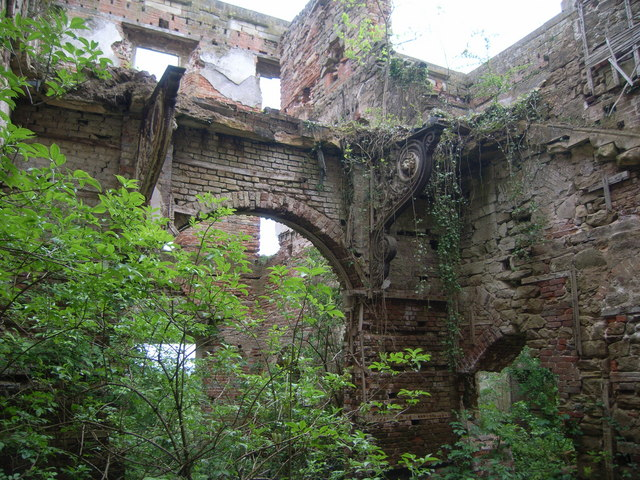
The entrance saloon

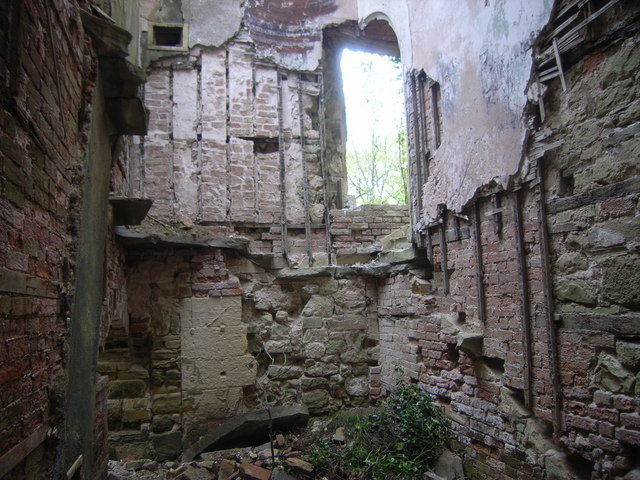
View of the interior

== Sources ==
- Bradney, Joseph Alfred (1994) [1929]. The Hundred of Caldicot, first part. A History of Monmouthshire from the Coming of the Normans into Wales down to the Present Time Volume 4, Part 1. Cardiff, Wales: Merton Priory Press. ISBN 978-1-873-36116-0. OCLC 30354814.
- Coxe, William (1995) [1801]. An Historical Tour of Monmouthshire: Volume 2. Cardiff: Merton Priory Press. ISBN 978-1-898-93708-1. OCLC 34476778.
- Gilpin, William (2005) [1782]. Observations on the River Wye and Several parts of South Wales, &c., Relative Chiefly to Picturesque Beauty, made in the summer of the year 1770. London: Pallas Athene. ISBN 978-1-843-68004-8. OCLC 72761769.
- Hayman, Richard (2016). Wye. Woonton Almeley: Logaston Press. ISBN 978-1-910-83909-6. OCLC 957738564.
- Mitchell, Julian (2009). "Piercefield and the Wye Tour, 1740-1800". In Gray, Madeleine; Morgan, Prys (eds.). The Making of Monmouthshire, 1536–1780. The Gwent County History. Vol. 3. Cardiff: University of Wales Press. ISBN 978-0-708-32198-0. OCLC 552064875.
- Mitchell, Julian (2010). The Wye Tour and its Artists. Woonton Almeley, Herefordshire: Logaston Press. ISBN 978-1-906-66332-2. OCLC 648769582.
- Murphy, Ken (2005). The Piercefield Walks and associated picturesque landscape features: An archaeological survey (PDF). Llandeilo, Wales: Dyfed Archaeological Trust.
- Newman, John (2000). Gwent/Monmouthshire. The Buildings of Wales. London: Penguin. ISBN 978-0-140-71053-3. OCLC 45327986.
- Peterken, George (2008). Wye Valley. London: Collins. ISBN 978-0-007-16068-6. OCLC 851762832.
- Waters, Ivor (1964). The Unfortunate Valentine Morris. Chepstow, Wales: Chepstow Society. OCLC 937415391.
- Waters, Ivor (1975). Piercefield on the Banks of the Wye. Chepstow, Wales: F. G. Comber. ISBN 978-0-904-76500-7. OCLC 2597661.
- Whittle, Elisabeth (1992). The Historic Gardens of Wales. Cardiff: CADW. ISBN 978-0-117-01578-4. OCLC 60058597.
