= Boughspring =

Coordinates: 51.6718°N 02.6434°W

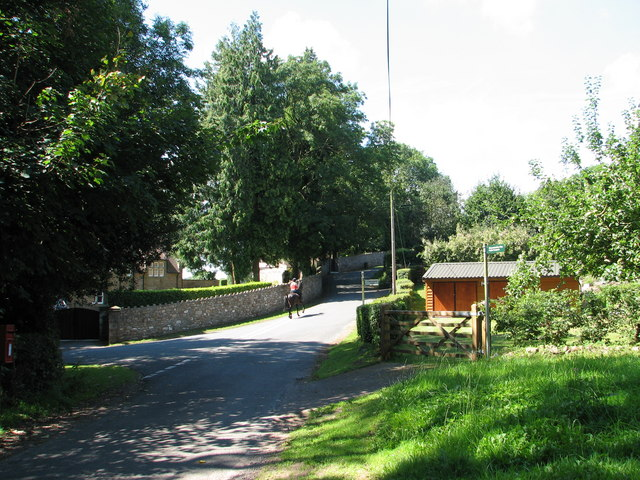

- Location within Gloucestershire
- OS grid reference: ST556972
- Shire county: Gloucestershire
- Region: South West
- Country: England
- Sovereign state: United Kingdom
- Post town: CHEPSTOW
- Postcode district: NP16
- Dialling code: 01291
- Police: Gloucestershire
- Fire: Gloucestershire
- Ambulance: South Western

Boughspring is a hamlet in Gloucestershire, England.

== History ==
Settlement at Boughspring dates back to Roman times when a villa was built nearby. Boughspring Roman Villa was excavated in 1969 and again in 1985, which uncovered, among other things, a mosaic floor and a possible bath house.

Until the early 19th century Boughspring was known as Bowels Green. It originated as a squatter settlement on the southern edge of Tidenham Chase during the 17th and 18th centuries. A house called Caine's Hill House had been built there by 1670 east of the lane leading from Wibdon, and by 1815 there were around ten cottages scattered around the junction of the lanes at Boughspring.

A Wesleyan chapel was built at Boughspring in 1836 – it had a congregation of around 45 in 1851. The Wesleyan community died out in the early years of the 20th century. The chapel was used for a time in the 1920s as a church boys' club. Contrary to some records, it was not totally demolished but converted into a house during the 1960s. The current owner described seeing evidence of the original walls, built with lime-mortar, at the roof space level and the quoins (corner-stones) are visible on the lower portions of the original building.
