= Miss Grace's Lane =

Cave system in Tidenham, England

Coordinates: 51°41′24.94″N 2°38′48.49″W

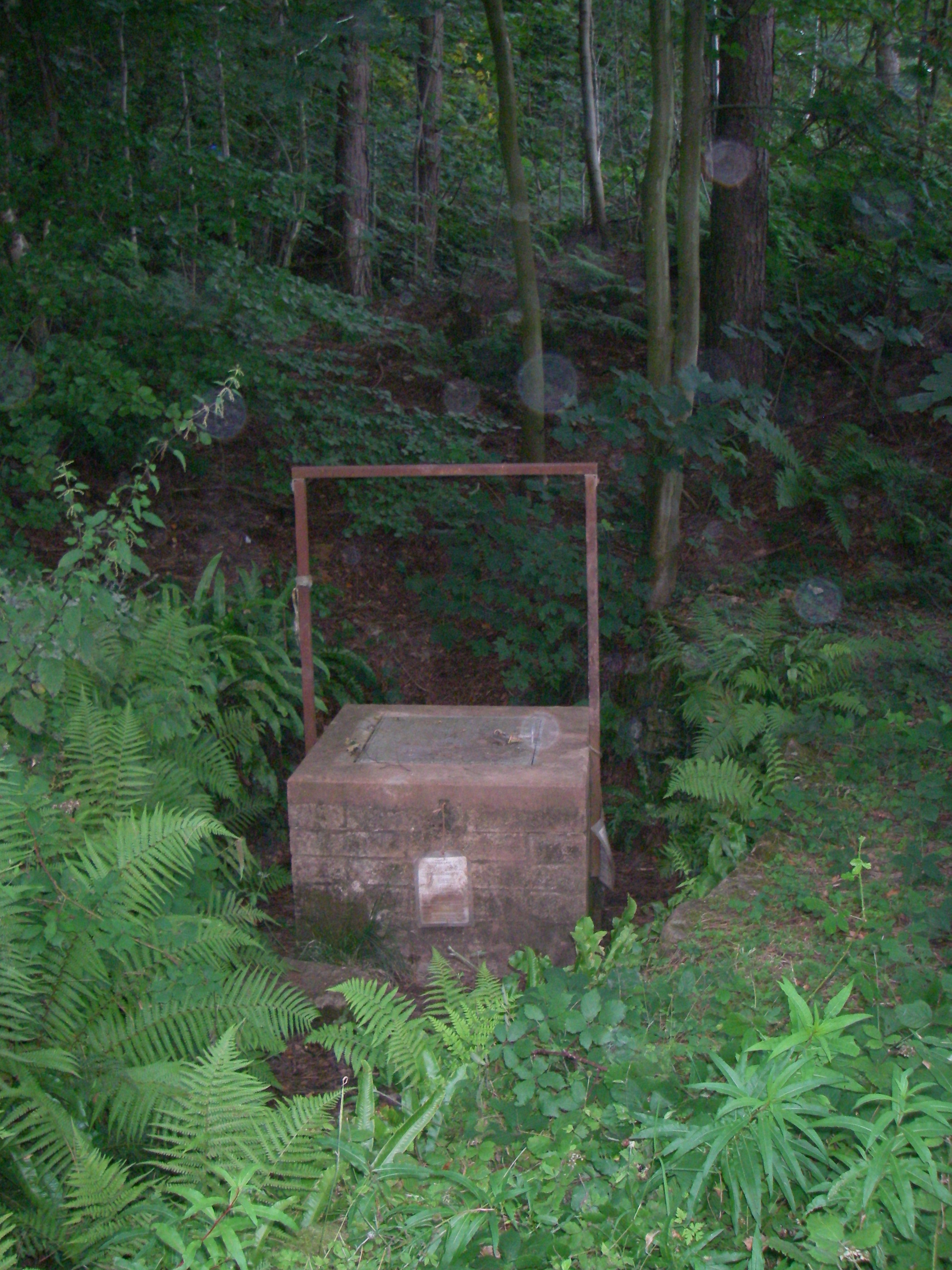
Entrance to Miss Grace's Lane cave

Miss Grace's Lane (also known as Miss Grace's Lane Swallett), near Tidenham in the Forest of Dean, Gloucestershire, England, is a natural cave system, the entrance to which was excavated between 1994 and 1997 by members of the Royal Forest of Dean Caving Club (RFDCC).

Entry to the cave is via a locked manhole cover, the keys to which are held by the RFDCC, which has an access agreement with the landowners, the Forestry Commission. A 30-metre (98 ft) shaft with a fixed ladder gives access to the first chamber known as "Autumn Frenzy".

The cave is approximately 4 kilometres (2.5 mi) long and is the second-longest cave in the Forest of Dean area, the longest being Slaughter Stream Cave at 13 kilometres (8.1 mi).
