= Lower Wye Gorge SSSI =

Protected area in Gloucestershire, England

Lower Wye Gorge
- Site of Special Scientific Interest
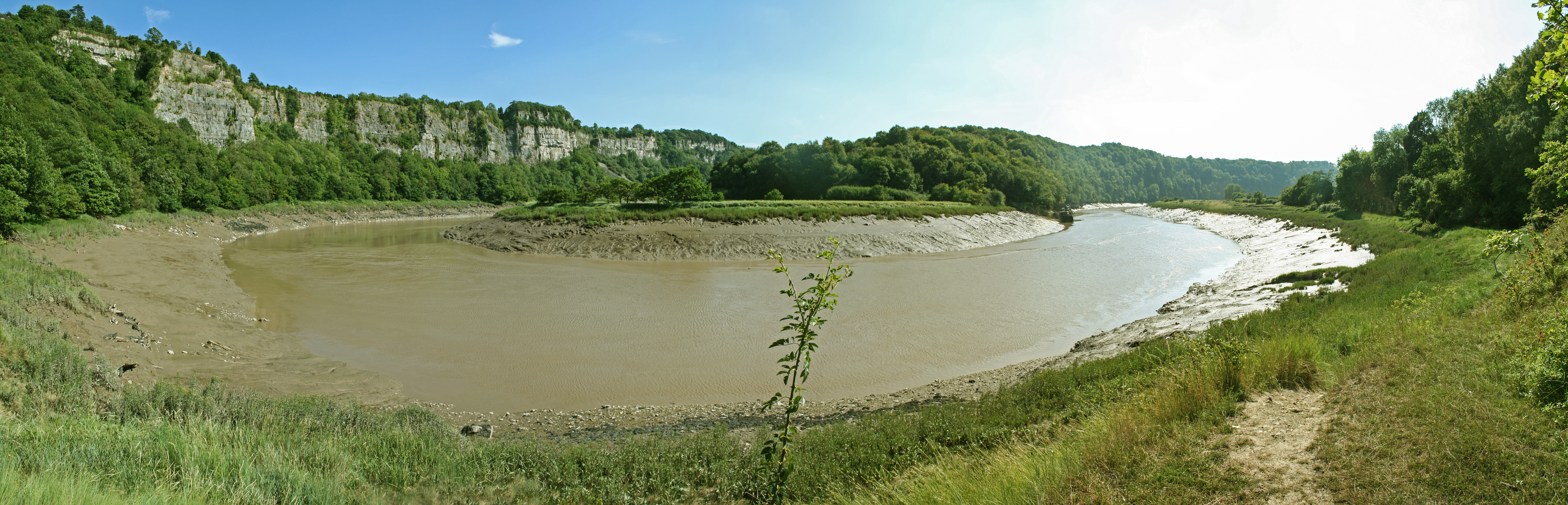
- River Wye at Lancaut, looking towards Wintour's Leap
- Location of Lower Wye Gorge.
- Area of search: Gloucestershire
- Grid reference: ST548983, ST537967
- Coordinates: 51.666°N 2.666°W
- Interest: Biological/Geological
- Area: 65 ha (160 acres)
- Notification date: 1954

Lower Wye Gorge (grid reference ST548983, ST537967) is a 65-hectare (160-acre) biological and geological Site of Special Scientific Interest in Gloucestershire, notified in 1954 and renotified 1987. The site includes two Gloucestershire Wildlife Trust nature reserves being Ban-y-gor Wood and Lancaut. The Natural England citation states a revision for Lancaut inclusion.

The site (Lancaut and Ban-y-gor) is listed in the 'Forest of Dean Local Plan Review' as a Key Wildlife Site (KWS).

Wye Valley Woodlands/ Coetiroedd Dyffryn Gwy are recognised as a Special Area of Conservation (SAC) under the EU Habitats Directive.

== Location and habitat ==
The Lower Wye valley Gorge is in the Wye Valley Area of Outstanding Natural Beauty. The woodlands of the lower Wye Valley are one of the most important areas for woodland conservation in the United Kingdom. This is an area of semi-natural woodland which is continuous along the gorge sides. The woods are a mixture of stand types which are considered to be similar to the original natural woods of the valley. Rare and local species are present.

There are two units of assessment. Unit 1 is a 26-hectare (64-acre) site and includes Ban-y-gor Wood nature reserve. Unit 2 is a 39-hectare (96-acre) site and includes Lancaut nature reserve. Wintour's Leap is part of the Lancaut nature reserve.

== Lancaut reserve ==
Lancaut reserve within Gloucestershire (Ban-y-gor is to the north of Lancaut)

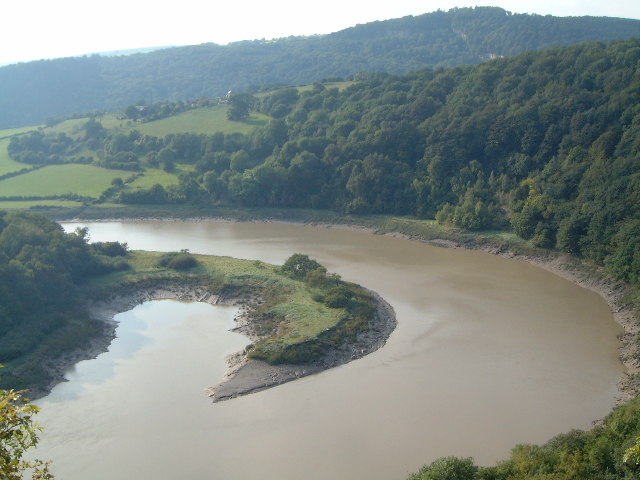
A view north of the River Wye, Lancaut

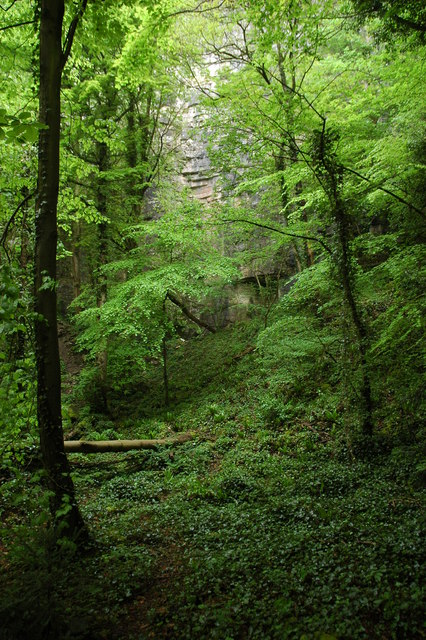
Below Wintour's Leap, Lancaut

Lancaut reserve (grid reference ST539966) is a 24-hectare (59-acre) site and lies on the east bank of the Wye Gorge, north of Chepstow. The gorge is formed from massive Lower Carboniferous limestones and sandstones and rises 250 ft above the tidal River Wye. The reserve is made up of Lancaut Wood, Pen Moel and Chapelhouse Woods, disused quarries, limestone cliffs, and saltmarsh. It is one of the few sites in the United Kingdom showing the natural transition from saltmarsh to valley woodland. It became a Gloucestershire Wildlife Trust reserve in 1971. There is a public footpath which runs through the woods from the ruins of Lancaut Chapel to below Pen Moel, which returns by Offa's Dyke Path.

=== Trees ===
The steep slopes and historic quarrying of limestone for agriculture and construction, such as the Avonmouth Docks, have resulted in a diverse woodland. Trees include pedunculate oak, ash, field maple, yew, small-leaved lime, wild service-tree, wayfaring tree and rare whitebeams.

=== Ground flora ===
The ground flora includes ferns and a spring display of primrose, bluebell, dog-violet, wood anemone and early purple orchid. Also recorded are green hellebore, bird's nest orchid and fingered sedge. Wild flowers grow on the open rock faces, cliff ledges and in the quarries. These include hairy violet, yellow-wort, lesser calamint, oxeye daisy, red valerian and shining crane's-bill. The flora of the saltmarsh includes sea aster, English scurvy-grass, sea milkwort and buck's-horn plantain. There are a variety of lichens and mosses.

=== Birds and mammals ===
Lancaut's cliffs, which are south-facing, are regular nesting sites for peregrine falcons and ravens. Sparrowhawk, goshawk, kestrel, cormorant, grey heron, shelduck, wood warbler, lapwing and goldcrest are amongst the wide range of birds recorded. `

=== Conservation ===
Invasive sycamore is controlled and scrub removed from limestone scree areas to promote a grassland flora. Erosion of the saltmarsh from natural and artificial causes is considered a major problem.

== Ban-y-gor Wood ==
Ban-y-gor Wood (grid reference ST536967) is a 23.2-hectare (57-acre) site and faces north and is, therefore, a much darker, cooler and wetter wood than Lancaut. The wood was donated to the Gloucestershire Wildlife Trust in 1995 by the Clay Estate, and part of Lancaut was given at the same time. The wood descends about a 100 metres down to the River Wye edge. The slopes are very steep and there are areas of cliff exposures, bare sandstone, and limestone rocks. Although steep and potentially inaccessible, there is evidence of quarrying in the past. There is derelict winding gear present which was used to pump water up from the river.

This is an area of secluded habitat, carpeted with ferns and mosses, with large ancient coppice and pollards. A single path descends via a small glade towards the river.

=== Trees ===
The tree canopy includes beech (some huge old coppice stools), ash, sessile oak, silver birch, common whitebeam and small-leaved lime. Yew is the dominant shrub, particularly beneath beech trees. There is hazel coppice, field maple, hawthorn, holly and goat willow. There is a rare hybrid present between rowan and whitebeam.

=== Ground flora ===
The conditions are damp and acidic and the ground flora includes foxglove, woodruff, tutsan, slender St John's-wort, wild madder, great woodrush, wood sage, bilberry, wood sorrel. The many ferns include hard shield fern, hard fern, scaly male-fern and maidenhair spleenwort. The general woodland flowers include bluebell, wood anemone, primrose, dog-violet and yellow archangel. There are many mosses and liverworts present.

=== Mammals ===
Dormice are recorded within the woodland.

=== Conservation ===
Structural variety is increased by cutting glades and small coppice coupes particularly either side of the path.

== Publications ==
- Kelham, A, Sanderson, J, Doe, J, Edgeley-Smith, M, et al., 1979, 1990, 2002 editions, 'Nature Reserves of the Gloucestershire Trust for Nature Conservation/Gloucestershire Wildlife Trust'
- 'Lancaut and Ban-y-Gor Nature Reserves – Information and the Lancaut Walk', (undated), Gloucestershire Wildlife Trust
- 'Where to see Wildlife in the Forest of Dean', January 2012, Gloucestershire Wildlife Trust

== See also ==
- Upper Wye Gorge
- Wye Valley AONB

== SSSI Source ==
- Natural England SSSI information on the citation
- Natural England SSSI information on the Lower Wye Gorge units
