= Cewydd =

6th-century Welsh saint

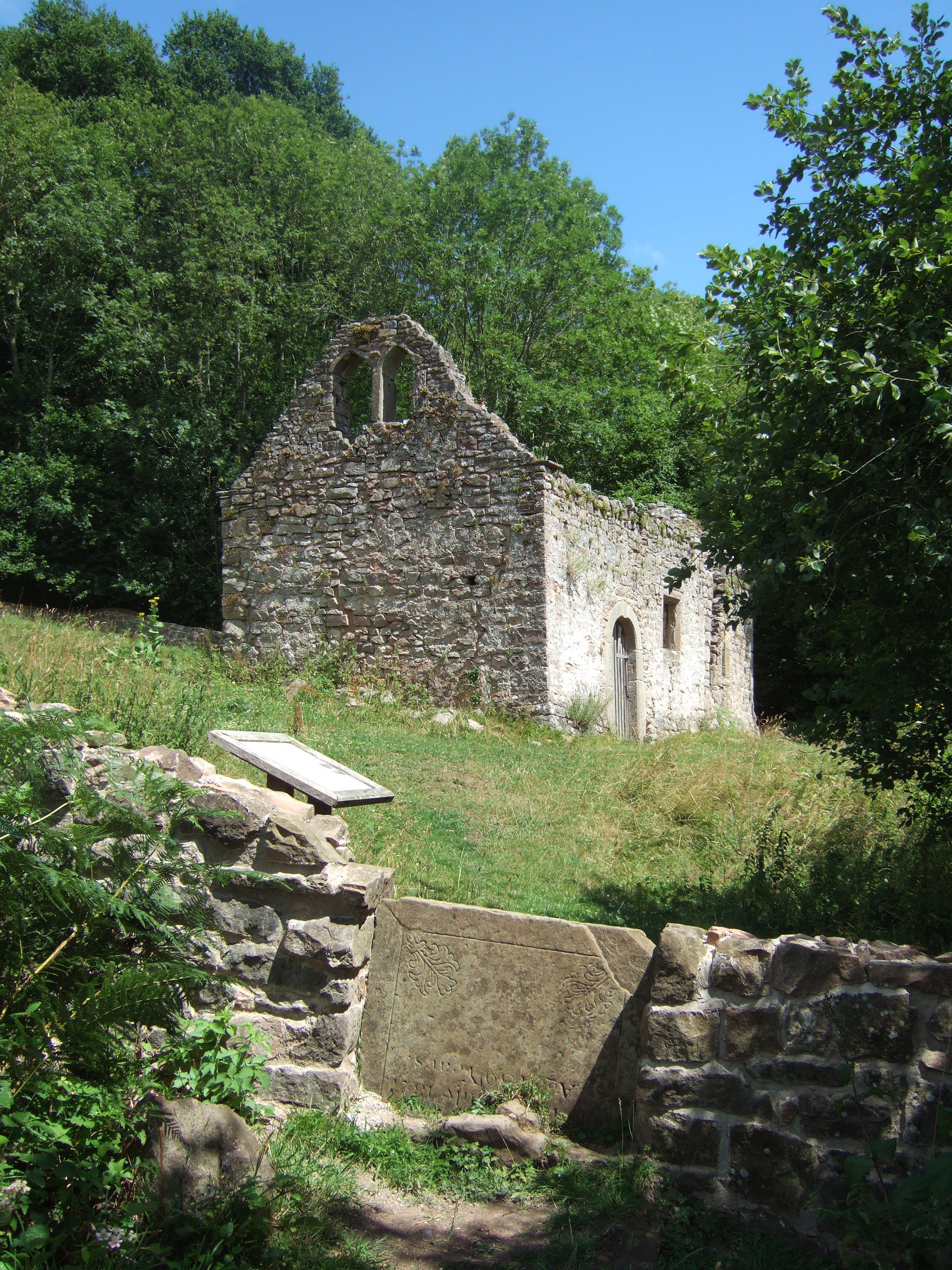
Church at Lancaut

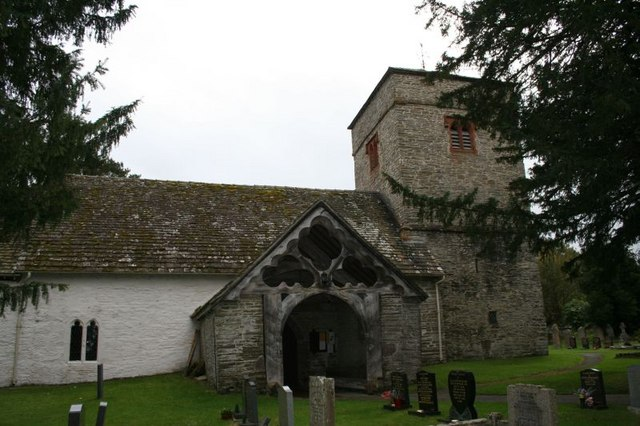
Church of St Cewydd

Saint Cewydd was a pre-congregational saint of Wales in the Early Middle Ages (6th century). He is known as the Welsh 'Rain Saint', like Medard in France, Gildas in Brittany and Swithin in England. It would appear that a pre-Christian rain day might have been associated with a date in July, when, if it rained on that day, it was believed rain would continue for forty days.

Very little is known of his life due to the scarcity of records in the early Dark Ages in Wales. He is known mainly from churches associated with him, which are on Anglesey (Wales), Lancaut in Chepstow (Wales/England border), Cusop (Wales/England border), Kewstoke (Somerset, England), Steynton in Rhos (Pembrokeshire, Wales), Aberedw (Radnorshire, Wales], Disserth yn Elfael (Radnorshire, Wales), Llangewydd and Laleston (Bridgend, Wales), Capel Cewy, Mynachlogddu (Pembrokeshire, Wales).

Ecclesiastical records in the Book of Llandaff refer to a religious establishment of lann ceuid, probably at Lancaut, which is likely to have been established by 625AD and was recorded there by 703AD.

His feast day is 1 July, but South Wales tradition records 15 July as Dygwyl Cewydd – Feast of St Cewydd (originally 2 July before the Julian/Gregorian calendar change).
