= Poor's Allotment =

Protected area in Gloucestershire, England

- Site of Special Scientific Interest
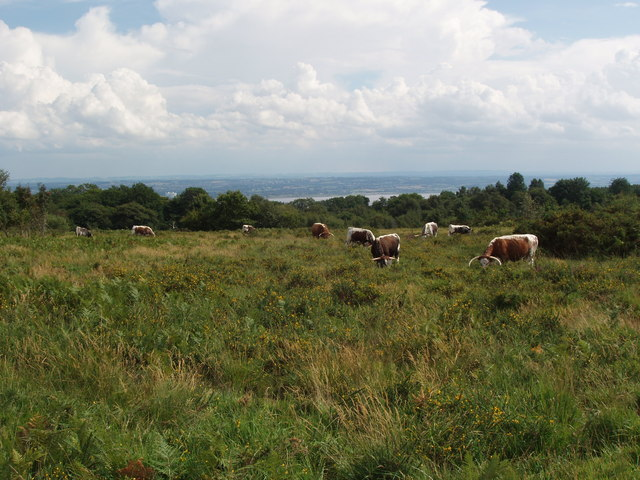
- Poor's Allotment with grazing cattle

- Location within Gloucestershire
- Location of Poor's Allotment.
- Area of search: Gloucestershire
- Grid reference: ST560990
- Coordinates: 51.688475°N 2.637178°W
- Interest: Biological
- Area: 28.57 ha (70.6 acres)
- Notification date: 1954

Poor's Allotment (grid reference ST560990) is a 28.57-hectare (70.6-acre) biological Site of Special Scientific Interest in Gloucestershire, notified in 1954. The site is listed in the 'Forest of Dean Local Plan Review' as a Key Wildlife Site (KWS).

The site is now part of a larger nature reserve of 60 hectares (The Park & Poor's Allotment (grid reference ST558992)) managed by the Gloucestershire Wildlife Trust. The Park's conservation interest is now managed in partnership with the Forestry Commission who are the land owners. Poor’s Allotment is owned by trustees from the parish of Tidenham.

== Location and history ==
The site partly overlies carboniferous rocks of the Forest of Dean. Some of the site is heath vegetation which is over Drybrook sandstone, and some is vegetation which grows on the calcareous soils on Drybrook limestone. This nature of this site is, therefore, of significant regional importance because of this complexity of habitats.

The land (as its name would indicate) was historically allocated under an Enclosure Award (1814) and was to be managed for the benefit of the poor. The parishes involved were Lancaut and Tidenham. It remains rough grazing land and it is a local viewpoint.

== Habitat and flora ==
This is acidic grassland and lowland heath with areas of dense bracken. In the south-east the limestone soils support calcareous grassland and broad-leaved woodland.

Heathland species include Common bent, Sheep's Fescue and Creeping Fescue. There are extensive areas of Western Gorse and Ling. Also recorded are Bell Heather, Cross-leaved Heath, Bilberry, Sheep's Sorrel and Heath Bed-straw. The calcareous limestone grassland includes a range of fescue species and herbs such as Rock Rose, Thyme, Stemless Thistle, Salad Burnet and Bird's-foot Trefoil. The wooded areas include Oak, Holly, Yew, Field Maple and Whitebeam. Ground flora includes Dog's Mercury and Bluebell

Recently noted scarce plants are Flea Sedge, Soft-leaved sedge, Autumn-ladies tresses, Star sedge and Lesser skullcap. Alder buckthorn also occurs.

There is a spring which feeds a pond towards the centre of the site. This area supports invertebrates. Wetland plants flourish along the edges.

== SSSI Source ==
- Natural England SSSI information on the citation
- Natural England SSSI information on the Poor's Allotment units
