= Shorn Cliff and Caswell Woods =

Biological Site of Special Scientific Interest in Gloucestershire, England

Shorn Cliff And Caswell Woods
- Site of Special Scientific Interest
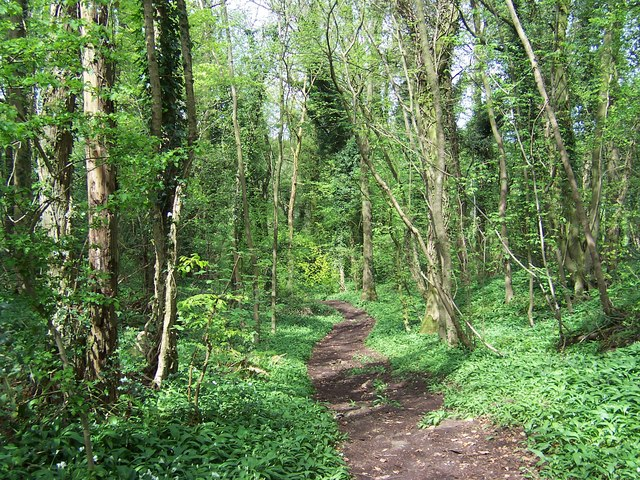
- Caswell Woods

- Location within Gloucestershire
- Location of Shorn Cliff And Caswell Woods.
- Area of search: Gloucestershire
- Grid reference: SO540005 & SO540990
- Coordinates: 51.7018°N 2.666306°W
- Interest: Biological
- Area: 69.2 ha (171 acres)
- Notification date: 1986

Shorn Cliff And Caswell Woods (SO540005 & SO540990) is a 69.2-hectare (171-acre) biological Site of Special Scientific Interest in Gloucestershire, notified in 1986. The site is listed in the 'Forest of Dean Local Plan Review' as a Key Wildlife Site (KWS).

The site lies in the Forest of Dean in the Wye Valley Area of Outstanding Natural Beauty. Both the Cliff and Woods are on Carboniferous Limestone and are on the east slopes of the Lower Wye Gorge which is also notified as an SSSI. This continuous belt of woodland stretches from Brockweir to Tutshill. The woodlands of the lower Wye Valley are one of the most important areas in Great Britain for woodland conservation. The woods lie within a matrix of semi-natural habitats and unimproved grassland. This contributes to the diversity and richness of this area of southern Britain.

Wye Valley Woodlands/ Coetiroedd Dyffryn Gwy are recognised as a Special Area of Conservation (SAC) under the EU Habitats Directive.

== Habitat and flora ==
The site contains a wide range of semi-natural woodland trees and rare and uncommon plants. Beech is dominant on the upper slopes and is frequently ancient coppice. Where the soil is calcareous there are Small-leaved Lime, Ash and Yew. Silver Birch and Oak grow on the acidic soils. Mature woodland does not support a strong ground flora and here is dominated by Ivy and species such as Spurge Laurel. Coppiced areas allow in light and denser ground flora occurs.

Coppiced ash woodland and small-leaved lime woodland are supported on the lower slopes. There are scattered Field Maple and shrubs are present such as Hazel, Wayfaring-tree and Guelder-rose. Ferns are numerous such as Hart's-tongue, Soft Shield-fern and Hard Shield-fern. Alder grows is the wetter soils near the River Wye (also notified as an SSSI) in Caswell Wood (Lynweir Grove).

There are woodland rides which support various plant life. There are springs on the lower slopes of Shorn Cliff Woods and other seepages in the area, and these provide opportunity for various plants to flourish which require this kind of habitat. These include Great Horsetail, Hemp Agrimony and Pendulous Sedge.

The site supports the nationally rare Wood Fescue and Narrow-leaved Bitter-cress. Local rarities include Wood-rush (Luzula forsteri), Wild Madder, Lily-of-the-valley and Tutsan. Martagon Lily is supported in adjacent woodland (Lippets Grove), which is a Gloucestershire Wildlife Trust nature reserve about half a mile south of Brockweir, and is leased from the Forestry Commission. The Grove is accessed along Offa's Dyke Path.

== Fauna ==
The site has bare limestone rock exposures which are a recorded breeding area for such birds as kestrel.

== SSSI Source ==
- Natural England SSSI information on the citation
- Natural England SSSI information on the Shorn Cliff And Caswell Woods units
