= National Diving and Activity Centre =

Flooded quarry in Gloucestershire, England

Coordinates: 51°39′20″N 2°38′50″W

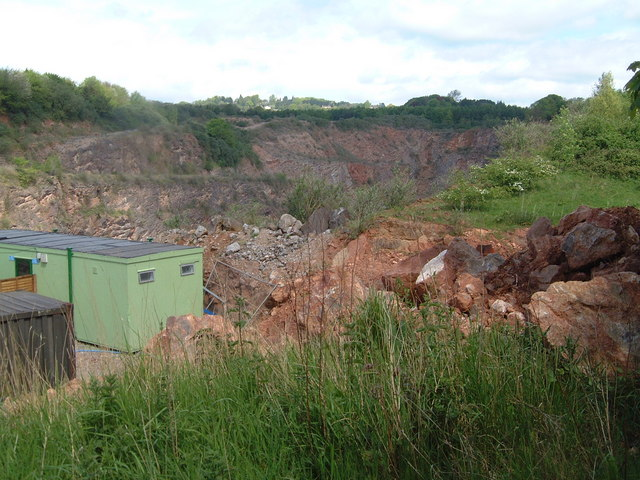
Dayhouse Quarry in 2000, before its use as the diving centre

The National Diving and Activity Centre (NDAC), was a facility located at a large flooded quarry at Tidenham, Gloucestershire, England, near to the border with Wales at Chepstow. It was previously Dayhouse Quarry, a source of limestone, which was flooded in 1996. The diving centre opened in 2003, and closed in 2022.

== Facilities ==
An inland scuba diving site, it was popular with technical and free divers due to the depths of up to 80 metres (260 ft), with underwater attractions in depths ranging from 6 metres (20 ft) to 76 metres (249 ft). PADI and IANTD training was provided on site, and many local BSAC and SAA clubs used the site for training. All freediving at the NDAC was undertaken through SaltFree Divers.

The site also included an inflatable assault course, bungee jumps, paddle boarding and a 700 m (2,300 ft) long zip wire.

== Closure ==
On 18 February 2022, the NDAC issued a statement via social media saying that the site was permanently closed. The following month it was reported that the site had been purchased by a company seeking to develop equipment to enable people to live deep under water. In September 2023 it was revealed that the site had been acquired by The DEEP Institute and renamed DEEP Campus.

== In media ==
In 2017, the NDAC was a location for the Netflix folk horror film Apostle starring Michael Sheen and Dan Stevens.
