= John Winter (Royalist) =

Sir John Winter also spelt Wintour and Wyntour (about 1600–1676) was an English ironmaster and landowner at Lydney in Gloucestershire, who was an ardent supporter of Charles I during the English Civil War.

== Biography ==
John Winter was one of the grandsons of Sir William Wynter, Vice-Admiral of England, who was granted the manor of Lydney in the Forest of Dean. His parents were Sir Edward Wynter and Anne, daughter of the Earl of Worcester.

The Forest of Dean contained rich deposits of iron ore and, with charcoal made from its timber, had been the location of ironworks back to Roman times. Edward Winter had invested in iron making and John continued this family business. There was widespread local opposition to Winter's interference with established commoners' rights in the Forest of Dean. In 1624 it was claimed that Winter "and other Papists" were storing gunpowder and ammunition at his uncle's fortress, Raglan Castle and were plotting rebellion against King James. He obtained a 21-year lease from the Crown for forty thousand cords of wood in 1628, but had to give this up in 1634 when a forest eyre found that he had exceeded his rights. This was the first such court to have been held in the Forest for three hundred years and followed the Skimmington riots of 1631, in which the common people had protested against his enclosures. These riots were part of a general pattern of resistance against enclosure known as the Western Rising.

On 20 February 1640, Sir John paid £10,000 for all the mines, minerals, and stone-quarries in the Forest of Dean, together with rights to all the timber, trees, woods and underwood growing there. In addition he agreed to pay £16,000 for six years, and a fee farm rent of £1950 12s. 6d. in perpetuity. He soon had fifteen furnaces and twenty forges with a capacity of six thousand tons, making him the second largest ironmaster in the country. However many local residents were dissatisfied with this deal, and during the English Revolution made use of the occasion to destroy the fences Winter had installed.

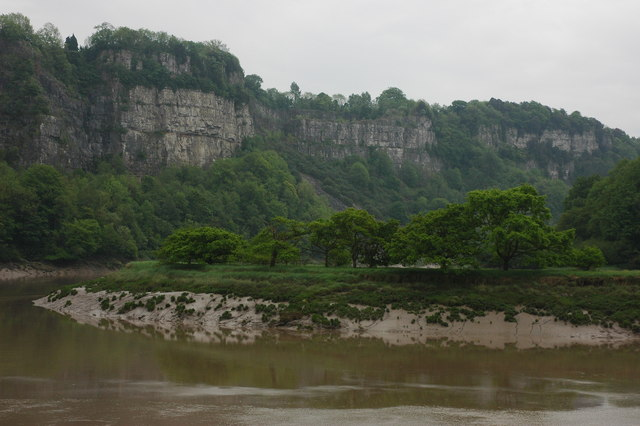
The River Wye below Wintour's Leap, where Sir John is said to have escaped his enemies

At the beginning of the First Civil War, Winter cast cannon for the King. As a committed Catholic and private secretary to the Queen, his allegiance to King Charles was expected, but he did not declare until the siege of Gloucester. In 1642 Winter tried to send cartloads of armaments from his residence at Lydney to Gloucester, and the following year fortified his house against attack. Following the relief of Gloucester by the Parliamentarians, he fought repeatedly with the forces of Colonel Massey, the governor of Gloucester. He was an unpopular commander, and a poor soldier, and lost repeatedly but always managed to escape. Sir John Corbet, in his contemporary account, An Historical Relation of the Military Government of Gloucester, said that Winter was "wise for himselfe, nimble in inferiour business and delighted more in petty and cunning contrivance than open gallantry..."

In October 1644, he joined with Prince Rupert to attempt to re-occupy the crossing point of the River Severn at Beachley which had been taken by Massey's Parliamentarians. The attempt failed, and Winter escaped by scrambling down a cliff at Sedbury into a waiting boat. Again, in February or March 1645, Massey's troops cornered Winter beside the River Wye at Lancaut, where he had been attempting to secure a river crossing, but he again managed to escape by boat. The tales of his escapes were embellished over time into a local legend that he had leaped on his horse down the 200-foot cliffs above Lancaut, which were later given the name "Wintour's Leap". His house at Lydney, White Cross Manor, had been fortified. In April 1645 he ordered it burnt to avoid it being taken over by the Parliamentarians.

After the Restoration, Winter maintained his interest in the iron industry, and experimented with a new type of coking oven, which foreshadowed the work later achieved successfully by Abraham Darby on smelting iron with coke.

== Publications ==
- A True Narrative Concerning the Woods and Ironworks of the Forrest of Deane, about 1668.
- Sir John Winter's Observations upon the Oath, published posthumously in 1679.
