= Tidenham =

Village in Gloucestershire, England

Coordinates: 51.6605°N 2.6435°W

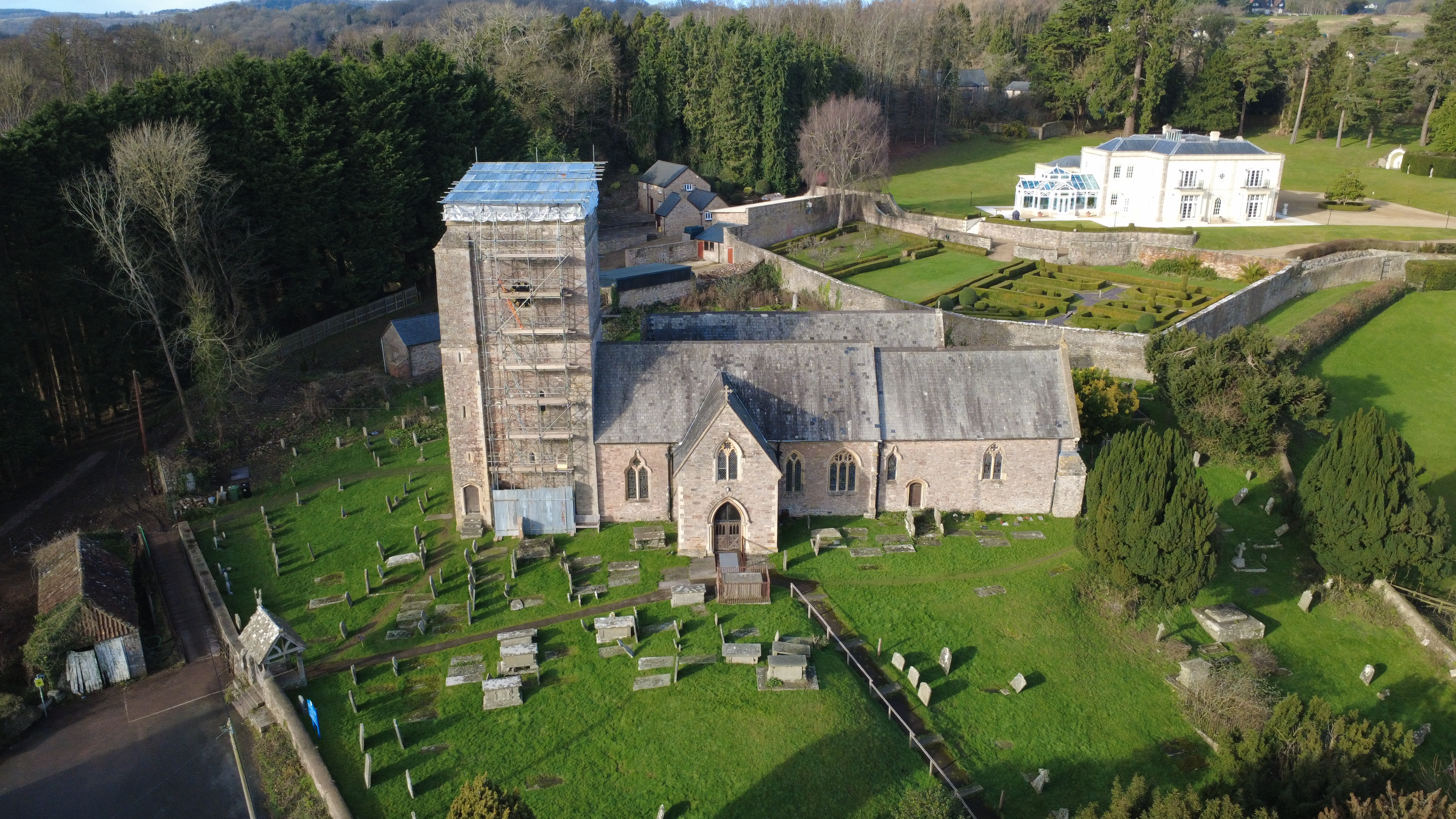
- Tidenham Church

- Location within Gloucestershire
- Population: 5,486
- OS grid reference: ST5558695942
- District: Forest of Dean
- Shire county: Gloucestershire
- Region: South West
- Country: England
- Sovereign state: United Kingdom
- Post town: CHEPSTOW
- Postcode district: NP16
- Dialling code: 01291
- Police: Gloucestershire
- Fire: Gloucestershire
- Ambulance: South Western
- UK Parliament: Forest of Dean

Tidenham (/ˈtɪdənəm/) is a village and civil parish in the Forest of Dean of west Gloucestershire, England, adjoining the Welsh border. Tidenham is bounded by the River Wye (which forms the Welsh border) to the west and the River Severn to the south. Offa's Dyke runs through the western part of the parish, terminating at Sedbury cliff above the River Severn.

== History ==
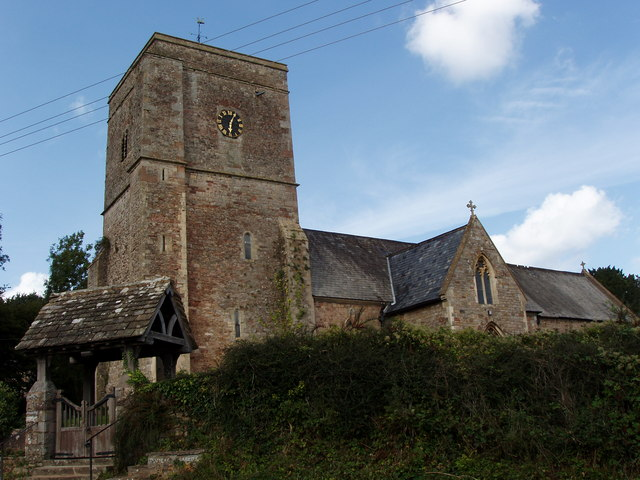
rightTidenham Church 2006

The village, once known as Dyddanhamme, is one of the most heavily documented Saxon villages in Britain and has been home to a grand manor of some kind since at least the 6th century AD. The Saxon structure was owned by the Abbot of Bath, who retained some of the documents on what was then an important location until the Dissolution of the Monasteries. The current Tidenham Manor, built in 2005 in the Palladian style, overlooks the river and is adjacent to the Norman parish church of St Mary’s and St Peter’s.

== Geography ==
The parish includes the villages of Tidenham, Beachley, Sedbury, Tutshill and Woodcroft, the hamlets of Boughspring, Stroat and Wibdon, and the deserted village of Lancaut. According to the United Kingdom Census 2001 the parish had a population of 5,316, increasing to 5,486 at the 2011 census. Tidenham, Beachley and Woolaston were added to Gloucestershire by the first Act of Union of England and Wales in 1536; previously they had been part of the Marcher lordship of Striguil.

The stretch of the Wye Valley lying within the parish includes several popular rock climbing cliffs at Wintour's Leap near Woodcroft and the Devil's Pulpit, a famous rock formation and viewpoint overlooking Tintern Abbey. The parish also contains Tidenham Chase - the largest remaining fragment of lowland heathland in Gloucestershire. Also notable is the former Dayhouse Quarry which, after providing traffic for the remaining fragment of the former railway to Monmouth, is now home to the National Diving and Activity Centre.

Miss Grace's Lane is a natural cave system approximately 4 kilometres (2.5 mi) long and is the second-longest cave in the Forest of Dean area.

Located as it is between the Wye and Severn the area has always been important as a site for crossing these rivers. Historically ferries crossed the River Severn from Beachley to Aust and now this route is followed by the Severn Bridge one of whose piers stands on the Beachley peninsula although the bridge itself begins in Wales. From Roman times the River Wye has been bridged between Tutshill and Chepstow.

The area was previously served by Tidenham railway station on the Wye Valley Railway. The railway, which once ran from Chepstow through Tintern up the Wye Valley, and joined the mainline near Tidenham, was closed in 1959 and was later the centre of several failed attempts to re-open it. In 2021 the route, known as the Wye Valley Greenway and including a 1 kilometre (0.6 mi) tunnel, was opened for walkers and cyclists.

== Governance ==
An electoral ward in the same name exists. The population and area of the ward is identical to the parish quoted above.

== Railways ==
The area is served by Chepstow railway station on the Gloucester to Newport Line.
