= Lancaut =

Deserted village in Gloucestershire, England

Coordinates: 51.666335°N 2.672217°W

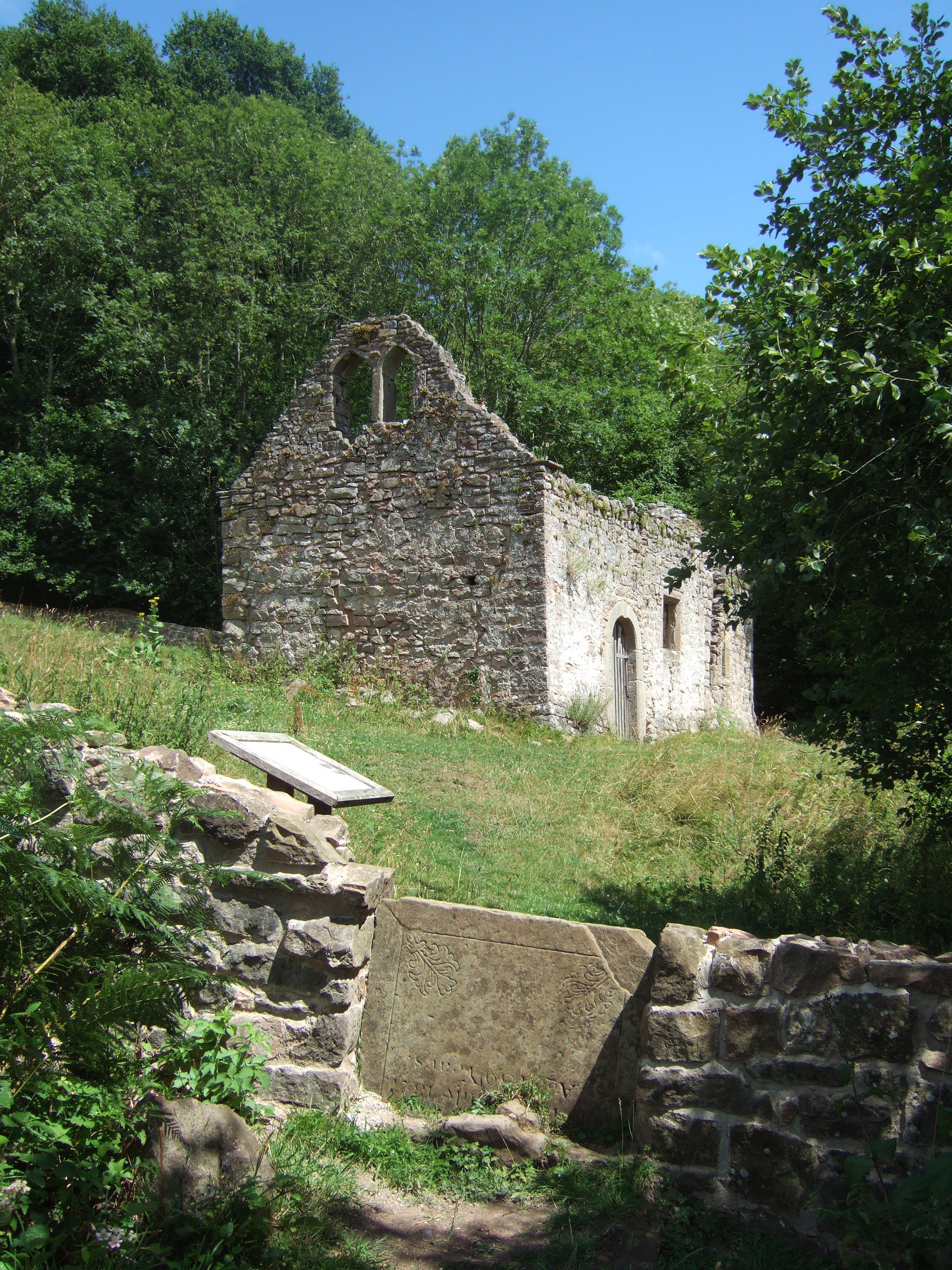
- Ruins of St James' church at Lancaut

- Location within Gloucestershire
- OS grid reference: ST5396
- Civil parish: Tidenham
- District: Forest of Dean
- Shire county: Gloucestershire
- Region: South West
- Country: England
- Sovereign state: United Kingdom
- Post town: CHEPSTOW
- Postcode district: NP16
- Dialling code: 01291
- Police: Gloucestershire
- Fire: Gloucestershire
- Ambulance: South Western
- UK Parliament: Forest of Dean

Lancaut is a deserted village and former civil parish, now in the parish of Tidenham, in the Forest of Dean district, in Gloucestershire, England, located alongside the River Wye, around two miles north of Chepstow. It occupies a narrow-necked promontory formed by a curve of the river, which acts as the border between England and Wales. Little remains of the village today, except for the roofless church of St. James.

== History ==
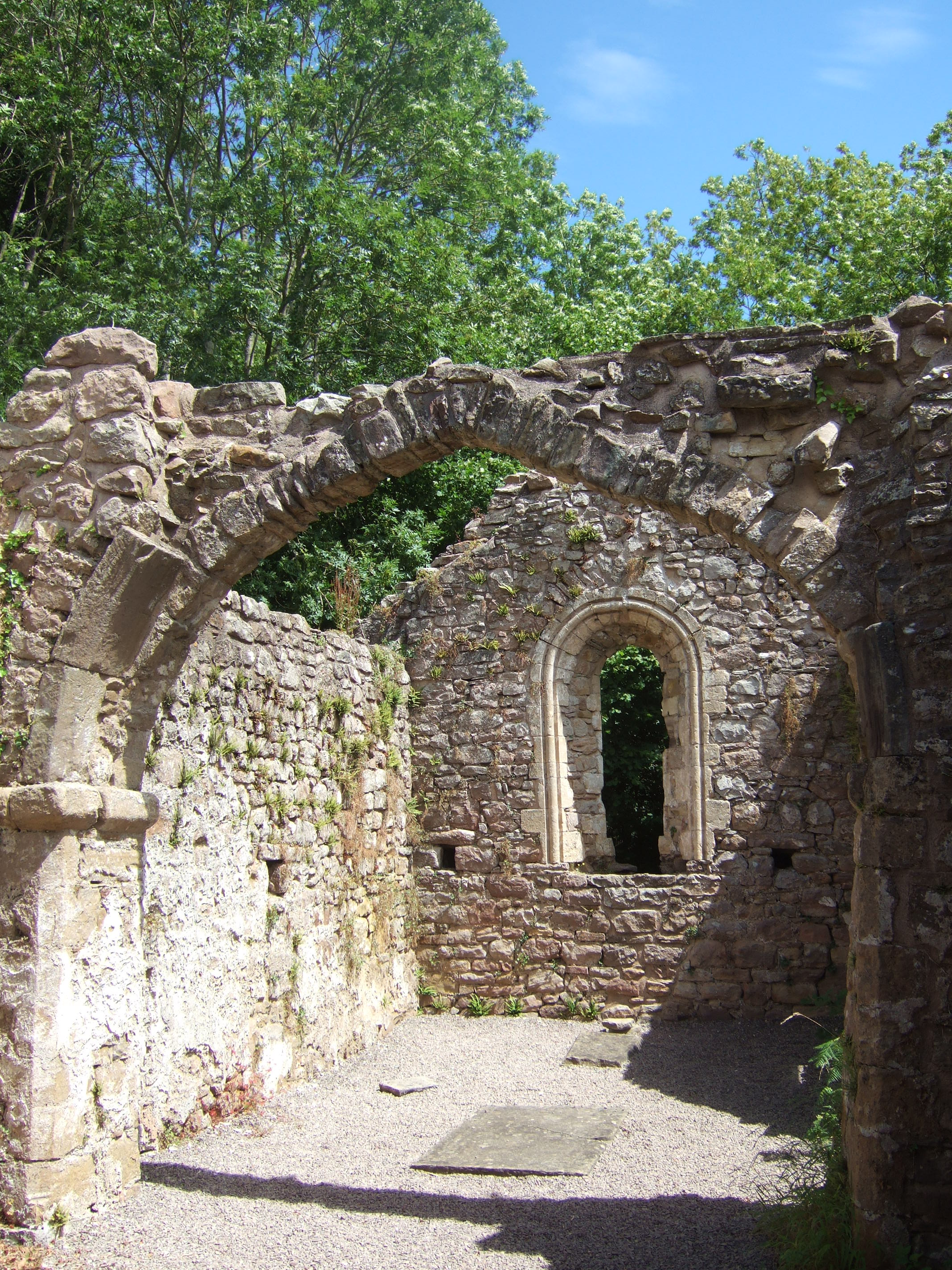
12th-century arch across the nave of St James church

The peninsula forms a strong natural defensive position and the ramparts of an Iron Age fort, known as Spital Meend, across this neck can still be identified. The site of the fort looks both north and south up and down the Wye, as well as eastwards towards the Severn estuary.

The name of Lancaut (historically, sometimes also spelled Llancourt) is an anglicisation of the Welsh: Llan Cewydd, or 'Church of Saint Cewydd', an obscure Welsh saint of the 6th century. Offa's Dyke, which was constructed in the late 8th century to define the area controlled by the Anglo-Saxon kingdom of Mercia and to deter incursions by the Welsh from the west, passed to the east of Lancaut, and incorporated part of the defences of the Spital Meend hillfort. The peninsula and parish of Lancaut, though on the eastern bank of the river, remained under Welsh control until the 10th century; by 956 it had been incorporated within the English king's manor of Tidenham.

The village was never large, but in 1306 contained 10 tenant households, and in 1551 had 19 adults. In early 1645, during the English Civil War, the local Royalist leader Sir John Wintour (or Winter) marched forces from Lydney to Lancaut in an attempt to fortify a ford across the Wye, but was defeated and forced to escape by boat. This gave rise to the local legend that he had leapt with his horse down the cliffs immediately below Lancaut to safety, the cliffs later becoming known as Wintour's Leap.

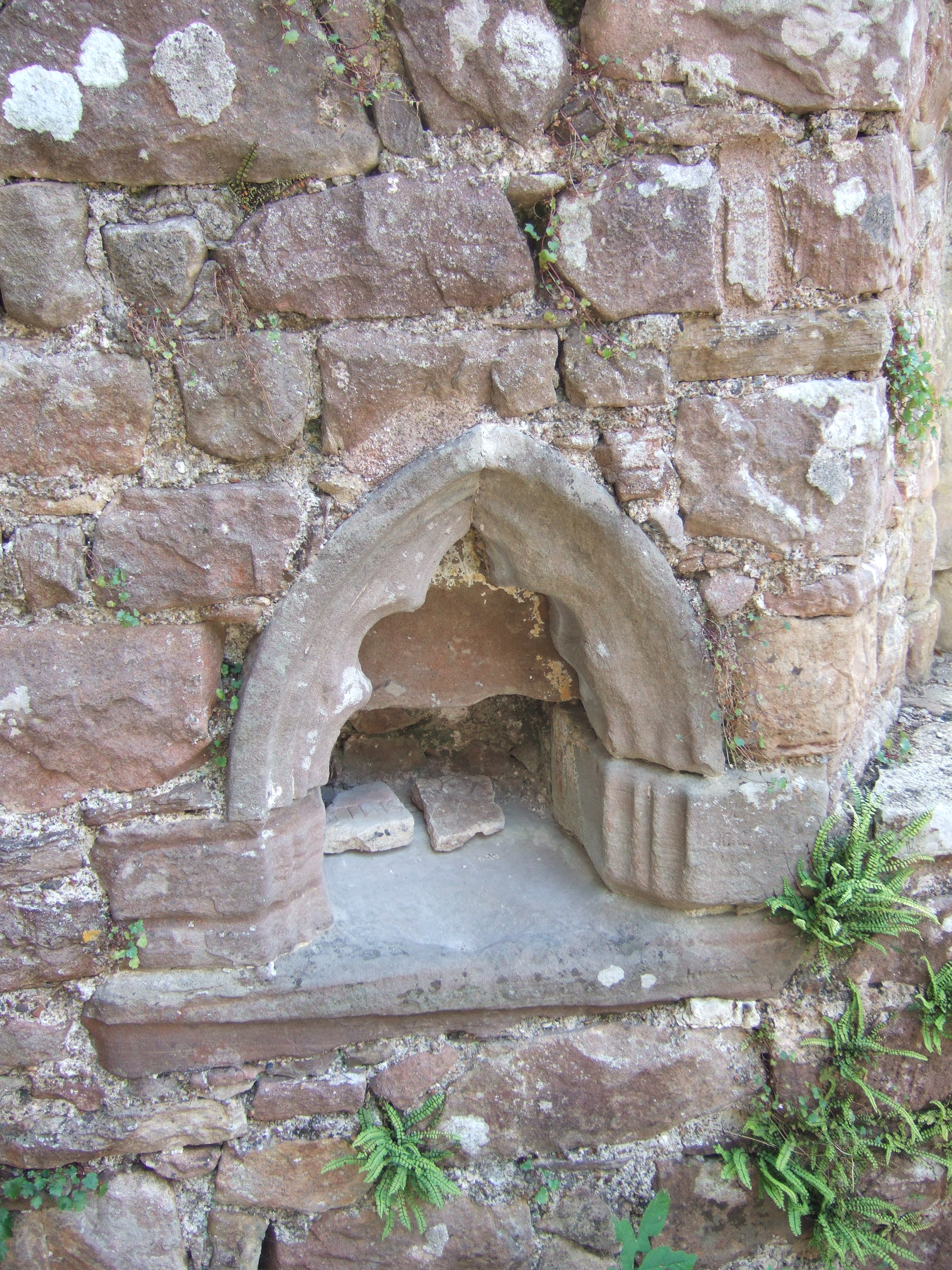
A Piscina in the wall of St James church

By 1750 the village had only two inhabited houses, and in 1848 the parish was recorded as having a mere 16 inhabitants. In 1931 the parish had a population of 10. The civil parish was merged with Tidenham on 1 April 1935. Today there is little remaining of the village except for a still-working farm.

== St James' Church ==
Today the only significant trace of the village above ground is the church of St James, which is a Grade II listed building within the site of a scheduled monument. Ecclesiastical records in the Book of Llandaff refer to a religious establishment of lann ceuid probably at this location, which is likely to have been established by 625 AD. A monastery was recorded here by 703. However, the construction of the church dates from the 12th century, the arch remaining across the chancel dating from this period.

The theory has been put forward that the settlement was connected to the Cistercian monks who founded their substantial Abbey up-river at Tintern in 1131. A cast lead font in the church, comparable to other local examples from the same mould, can be dated precisely to between 1120 and 1140. This font is now in the Lady Chapel of Gloucester Cathedral. Another suggestion is that it may once have been the site of a leper colony, and an unusual number of medicinal herbs including the non-native elecampane - once used to treat respiratory ailments - and green hellebore have been found in and around the churchyard.

Until 1711 the church was an independent ecclesiastical parish. After this date it was merged with another local parish, the new living being the rectory of Woolaston. Despite this, the church appears to have been substantially restored and rebuilt after this time. The double bell window still visible in the West wall was supplemented by a small bell turret in the roof above. In 1840 the antiquarian George Ormerod made drawings that record the church as having box pews and a pulpit fitted inside.

By the 1860s though, the parish congregation was reduced in number and services were only being held here during the summer months. In 1865, the Rector of Woolaston ordered that the church be abandoned. The roof and the interior fittings, together with the font, were removed. Church and village both declined after this time, and the church was deconsecrated. In the 1980s the chancel arch partially collapsed, prompting some restoration and consolidation work, together with archaeological study. Repairs were undertaken to the churchyard wall in 2010.

In December 2013, the church building was purchased for a nominal fee of £1 by the Forest of Dean Buildings Preservation Trust. The Trust intends to carry out a programme to stabilise the building.

== Nature Reserves and Wildlife ==
Lancaut, together with the adjacent woodland at Ban-y-Gor immediately to the north, was established in 1971 as a nature reserve, now managed by the Gloucestershire Wildlife Trust. It is also a Site of Special Scientific Interest (SSSI) and is within the Wye Valley Area of Outstanding Natural Beauty (AONB). Both reserves are part of the nationally important Lower Wye Gorge SSSI.

Fuller information may be found in the Gloucestershire Wildlife Trust nature reserves handbook. The River Wye at Lancaut supports a range of wildlife including otters, porpoises, cormorants, goosanders and herons. The woodland contains dormice, the rare lapidary snail, and uncommon plants such as narrow-leaved helleborine and the wild service tree. The narrow tidal banks are a rare example in Britain of a direct transition between natural saltmarsh and woodland. Fishing was historically important in the area, and the river contains traces of several medieval weirs, but salmon numbers have fallen markedly in recent years.

== Environment ==
Quarrying for limestone was important from medieval times, and the remains of two adjoining limekilns may be seen on the hillside above the church. It developed as a major industry after the building of Avonmouth Docks in 1877, and jetties were built at Lancaut to allow the transport of stone down the river. The quarry at Woodcroft, overlooking Lancaut, operated until the mid-twentieth century.

== Access ==
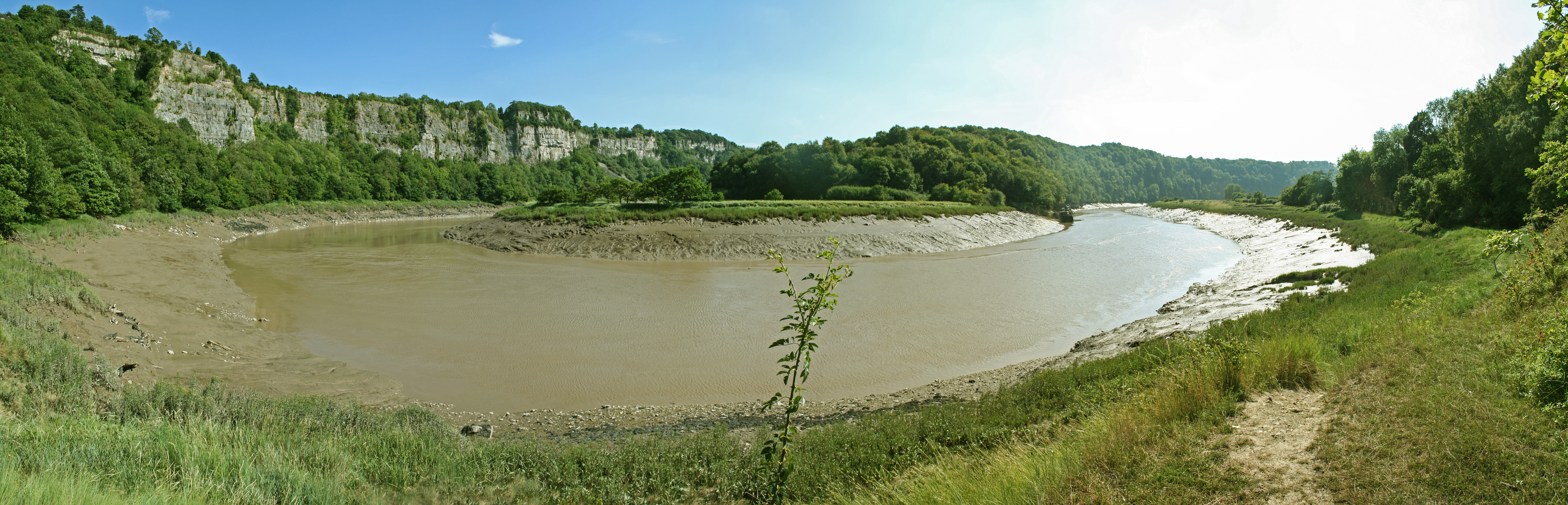
The River Wye at Lancaut, looking towards the cliffs at Wintour's Leap

The only road access to Lancaut is a narrow track to the farm. The church stands below this, down a steep bank. It can also be accessed by foot from Woodcroft, along part of the route of a circular walk from Chepstow which takes around 4 miles, across the 1816 Wye bridge, along the lower banks of the Wye to the church, then climbing up and returning along much the same route, but atop the cliffs of Wintour's Leap. This walk passes through the distinctive woodland of the Wye valley, including such rare and locally endemic species as the small-leaved lime. It crosses a scree slope of large boulders, created when an illegal post-war stone quarry blasted some of the limestone cliffs.
