= Wintour's Leap =

Viewpoint and rock climbing location in Gloucestershire, England

Coordinates: 51.665°N 2.669°W

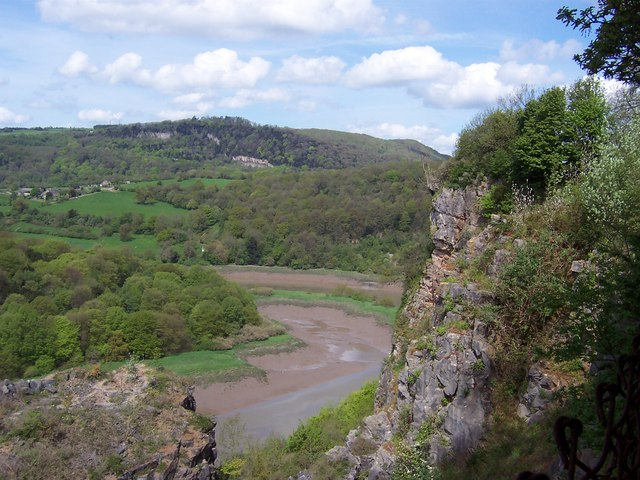
General view of Wintour's Leap

Wintour's Leap is a noted rock climbing location and viewpoint. It is located near the village of Woodcroft in Gloucestershire, on the English side of the Wye Valley, north of Chepstow.

== History ==
Wintour's Leap is named after Royalist Sir John Wintour who, hotly pursued on his horse by Parliamentary forces, according to local myth survived a leap off the cliff and, landing safely in the Wye below, swam to safety in the nearby Chepstow Castle. In fact, Wintour did escape from the Roundheads by using the river nearby on two separate occasions, but from less spectacular positions at Lancaut and Sedbury.

== Ownership ==
Wintour's Leap is owned by Gloucestershire Wildlife Trust and forms part of the Lancaut SSSI Nature Reserve. The cliffs of Wintour's Leap are frequent nesting grounds for Peregrine Falcons and provide niches for rare Whitebeam trees. Climbing access is by permission of Gloucestershire Wildlife Trust negotiated and supervised in consultation with the British Mountaineering Council. Climbing restrictions may apply.

== Rock climbing ==
The area around Wintour's Leap is a very popular limestone rock climbing area. It contains over 300 recorded routes most of which are multi-pitch. It has a high proportion of quality climbs up to 100-meters in length with something to offer all levels of climber. From south to north, the climbing areas are "Woodcroft Quarry", "Fly Wall", "GO Wall", "South Bay", "Far South Bay", "North Wall", and "Far North Wall". Woodcroft Quarry is behind Fly Wall and is the most recently developed area; routes are still being added (2009). The majority of the routes in the quarry are bolt-protected sport routes of varying degrees of quality. The Fly Wall is the most convenient traditional climbing route area with a small number of well-travelled (often polished) routes at HS & VS (See Grade (climbing)), and some good HVS to E5 routes. These two areas have recently (2009) come under the threat of development into a land fill site.

Great Overhanging (GO) Wall is the largest cliff at Wintour's and contains 4 and 5-pitch extremes. The routes here are multi-pitch' trouser fillers' all of which are technical and steep. Many break through the massive overhangs near the top of the wall. The routes are in the range E2 - E6, but also includes the iconic 'must do' route 'Burning Giraffe' at HVS. The southern bays contain a number of easier and very good multi-pitch routes in the grade range of Mod - E2. The north wall consists again of rather steep multi-pitch routes. Although there are 2 HS routes and a number of very good VS routes. The far end of the north wall is again very steep with stepped overhangs. The rock is also very compact, not lending itself to traditional protection. There is a lot of fixed gear here.
