= Teazle =

Teazle, teasle, teazel or teasel may refer to:

- Plants of the genus Dipsacus, including:
  - Fuller's teazle, Dipsacus fullonum
- Sir Peter Teazle (1784 – 1811), a racehorse
