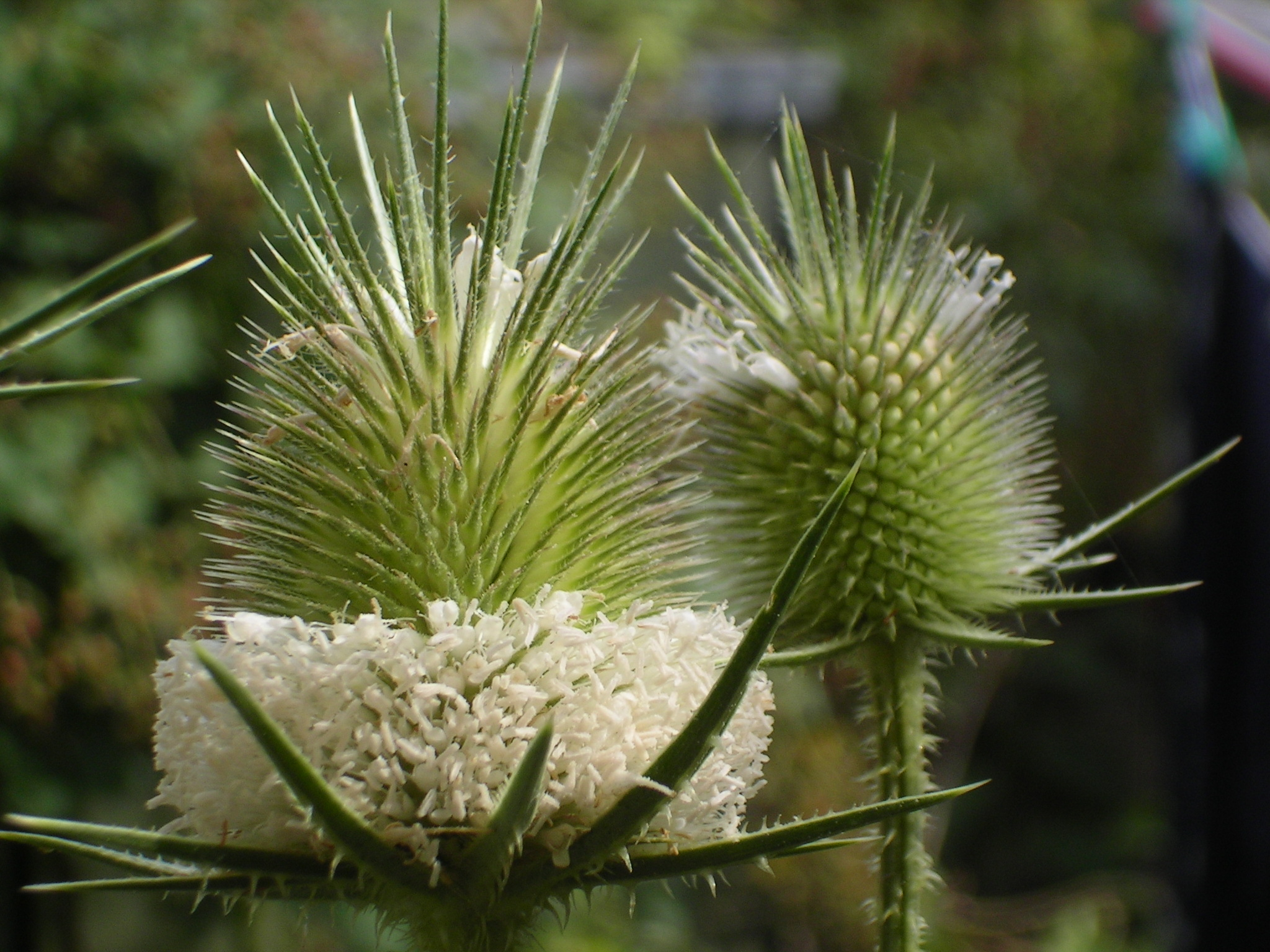

Scientific classification
- Kingdom: Plantae
- Clade: Embryophytes
- Clade: Tracheophytes
- Clade: Angiosperms
- Clade: Eudicots
- Clade: Asterids
- Order: Dipsacales
- Family: Caprifoliaceae
- Genus: Dipsacus
- Species: D. laciniatus

Binomial name
- Dipsacus laciniatus L.

= Dipsacus laciniatus =

Species of flowering plant

Dipsacus laciniatus is a species of flowering plant in the honeysuckle family known by the common name cutleaf teasel. It is native to Europe and Asia. It is present in North America as an introduced species and invasive weed.

This plant is a perennial herb that may grow up to two to three meters in height. The erect, branching stem is hollow and prickly. The leaves are oppositely arranged, each leaf pair joined around the stem and clasping it, their bases forming a cup which often collects water. The species is monocarpic, living for multiple years but only flowering once before dying. The inflorescence is an egg-shaped head subtended by long bracts. The head may contain up to 1500 flowers. Each individual flower lasts one day. The middle of the head blooms first and then the upper and lower parts. The fruit is an achene just under a centimeter long. The plant reproduces only by seed. This teasel may be distinguished from its relative, common teasel (Dipsacus fullonum) by flower color and leaf shape. Cutleaf teasel has white flowers and deeply cut leaves, while common teasel has purple flowers and toothed or wavy-edged leaves.

Cutleaf teasel is a weed in the United States, where it is most prevalent in the Midwest and northeastern states. It has been known in New York and Michigan since before 1900. It is now a dominant species in some areas, such as a tallgrass prairie in Illinois. It grows in a variety of habitat types, and does best on good soil; individuals growing on fertile soil reach large, robust sizes. Due to a lack of biological control agents in areas such as the Midwest that it is not native to, it can form large monocultures, displacing native species. The plants can also tolerate saline soils.

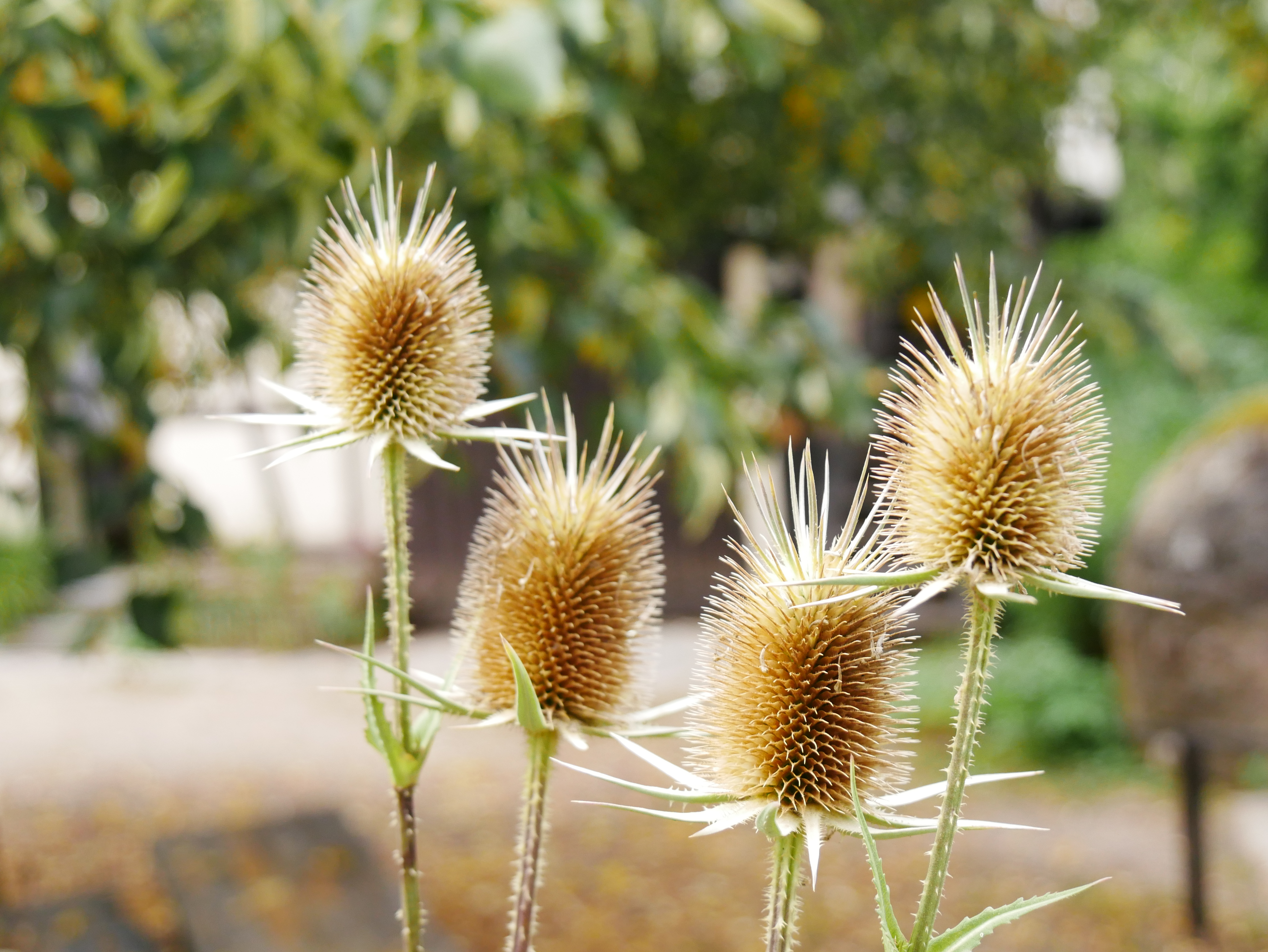
In August

Two moths useful for biological control were tested in Slovakia in 2003-2004 (following the identification of seven insects associated with the plant and their consideration), including the monophagous Endothenia gentianaeana. Although Endothenia gentianaeana was able to be reared in high numbers and its presence was found in nearly 100% of teasel plants surveyed in Slovakia, and despite the high level of damage caused by the second moth, Cochylis roseana (which was not targeted by local parasitic wasps frequently as was Endothenia gentianaeana), the USDA has not approved either of these moths for introduction as of February 2018. Instead, the USDA continues to suggest the use of herbicidal chemicals. The mite Leipothrix dipsacivagus was also suggested as a possible biological control agent in 2007, based on research.
