= Snows Farm Nature Reserve =

Nature reserve in Gloucestershire, England

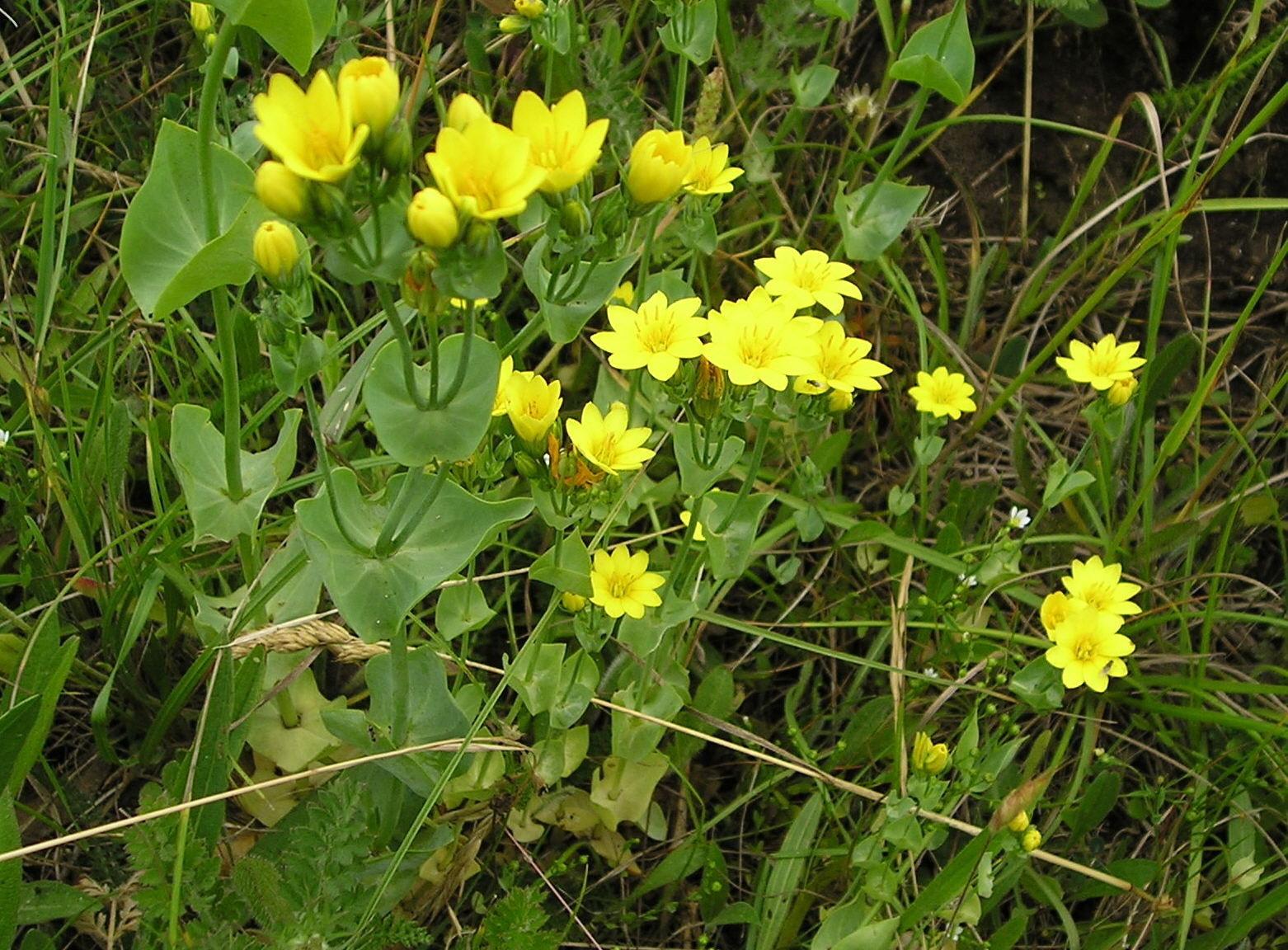
- Example - yellow-wort (Blackstonia perfoliata)

- Location within Gloucestershire
- Type: Gloucestershire Wildlife Trust nature reserve
- Location: head of Slad Valley near Stroud
- Coordinates: 51°46′19″N 2°9′52″W
- Area: 52.5 acres (21.2 ha)
- Created: 1975 by agreement, donated in 1989 to Trust
- Operator: Gloucestershire Wildlife Trust
- Status: Open at all times (with restrictions)

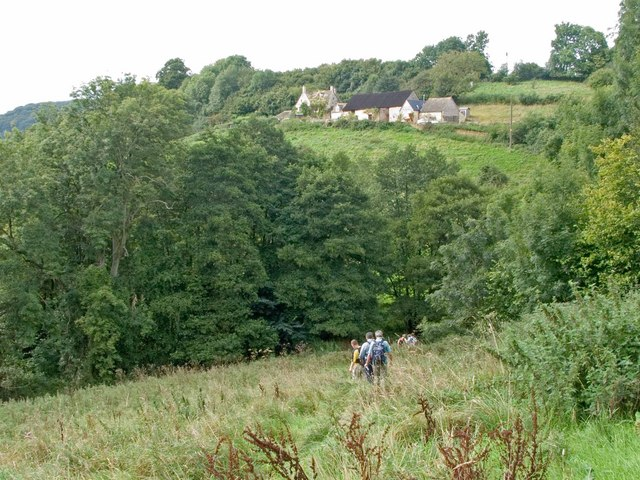
Walkers at Snows Farm

Snows Farm Nature Reserve (grid reference SO887081) is a 21.3-hectare (53-acre) nature reserve in Gloucestershire. The site is listed in the ‘Stroud District’ Local Plan, adopted November 2005, Appendix 6 (online for download) as a Key Wildlife Site (KWS).

The site is owned and managed by the Gloucestershire Wildlife Trust. It was held under agreement from 1975, but was donated to the trust in 1989 by Mr. P. Duddridge.

== Location and habitat ==
The reserve is sited at the head of the Slad Valley and is about three miles north-east of Stroud. The Dillay Brook runs through its centre. It is unimproved pasture, woodland and scrub. The sides of the reserve face south-east and north-west and the stream separates two geological formations. Oolitic limestone has formed the thin Rendzina soil of the west facing slope. The east facing slope has deeper, more neutral soil from Cotteswold Sand.

The northern end abuts Down Wood. There is an old derelict building known as the Old Shop at the northern end. All that is left is a walled enclosure and pile of stones. Access is from a track from Slad. The reserve is fenced with stiles and gates. Stock may be present on the site.

== Flowers ==
The site is rich in wild flowers. The limestone grassland supports early purple orchid, fragrant orchid and pyramidal orchids, along with autumn gentian, vervain, yellow-wort and clustered bellflower. Wild columbine may also be seen as well as wild liquorice, adder's-tongue, stinking hellebore and the small teasel.

The neutral grassland supports betony, lousewort, devil's-bit scabious and lady's-mantle. The wetter stream area at the bottom supports ramsons and golden-saxifrage. The more marshy areas support forget-me-not, brooklime and marsh-marigold. ferns are also present such as hart's-tongue.

The ground flora in the woodland at the top of the west slope includes moschatel, spurge-laurel and wood anemone. The uncommon fingered sedge (Carex digitata) is present. Over 300 plant species are recorded for this site.

== Trees and scrub ==
The scrub includes dog-rose, field-rose, hawthorn, dogwood and there are wayfaring-trees. Alder, white willow, ash and hazel grow along the edges of the stream. There is a woodland of beech and ash at the top of the west slope. There the scrub includes field maple, hazel and wild cherry.

== Bird life ==
Whitethroat, marsh tit, skylark, tree pipit and grey wagtail are some of the birds recorded at the reserve. The great spotted woodpecker is also present. Over 70 different bird species are recorded for this site.

== Invertebrates ==
There are good populations recorded of small blue, marbled white and green hairstreak butterflies. Many moths species are recorded including the six-spot burnet. Ant-hills from the yellow meadow ant are present in the pasture. Recorded as plentiful on this site is the bloody-nosed beetle. The snail Helicella itala is seen, and the rare green spider Micromatta virescens.

== Reptiles ==
Common lizard and adder may be seen on sunny days.

== Conservation ==
The traditional management method of sheep grazing is used to control the growth of tor-grass and upright brome. This encourages the wild flowers to flourish and to spread. Cattle grazing helps to control scrub, the clearance and control of which is important to maintain the open areas of pasture. The correct grazing balance has to be maintained - too much will overgraze the site and too little will allow the vigorous grasses to flourish to the detriment of the flowers.

== Publications ==
- Kelham, A, Sanderson, J, Doe, J, Edgeley-Smith, M, et al., 1979, 1990, 2002 editions, 'Nature Reserves of the Gloucestershire Trust for Nature Conservation/Gloucestershire Wildlife Trust'
- (undated), 'Snow's Farm Reserve Handbook', Gloucestershire Trust for Nature Conservation
- 'Snows Farm Nature Reserve – A secret valley paradise for wildlife and people', (undated), Gloucestershire Wildlife Trust
- ‘Nature Reserve Guide – discover the wild Gloucestershire on your doorstep’ - 50th Anniversary, January 2011, Gloucestershire Wildlife Trust
