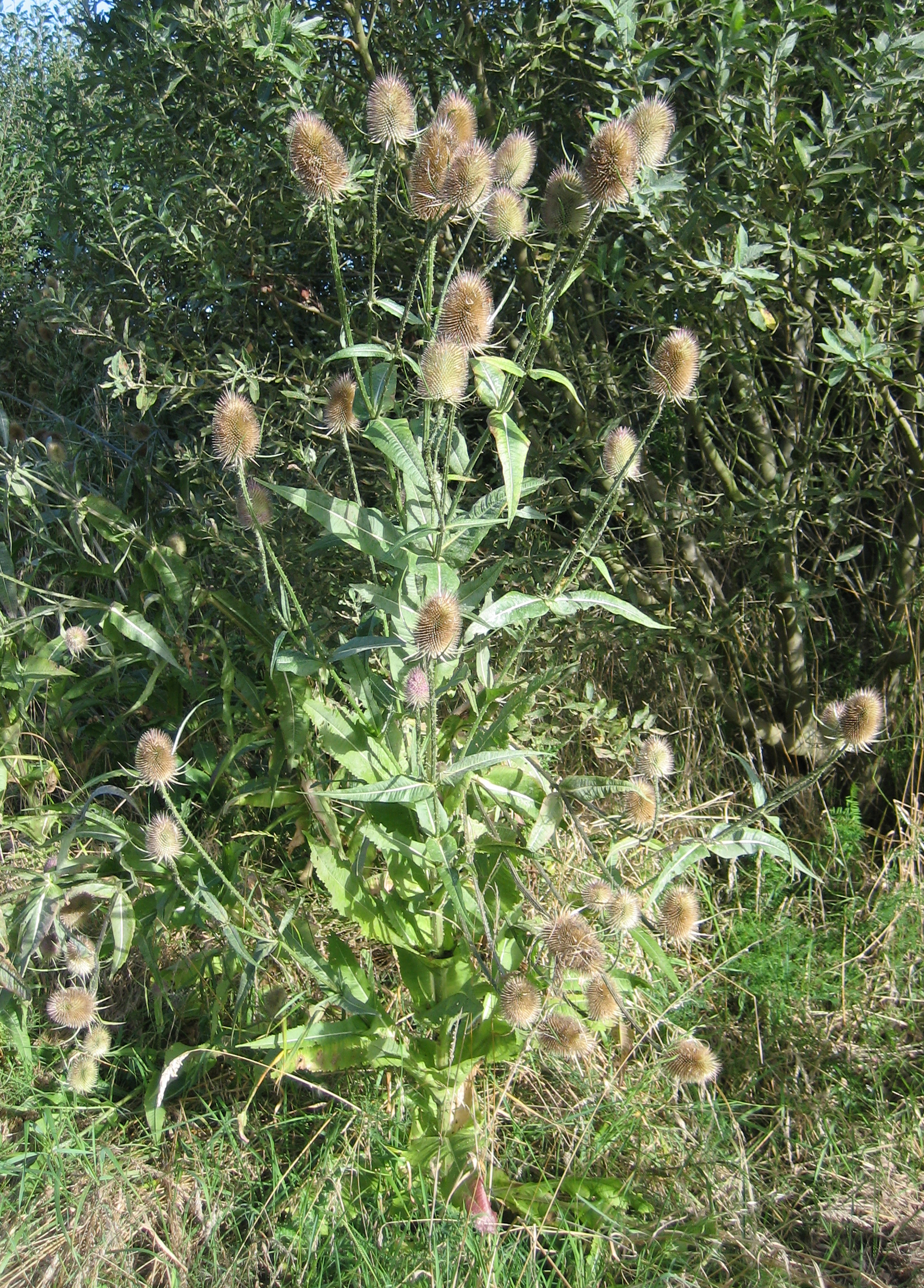
- Dipsacus fullonum

Scientific classification
- Kingdom: Plantae
- Clade: Embryophytes
- Clade: Tracheophytes
- Clade: Spermatophytes
- Clade: Angiosperms
- Clade: Eudicots
- Clade: Asterids
- Order: Dipsacales
- Family: Caprifoliaceae
- Subfamily: Dipsacoideae
- Genus: Dipsacus; L.

Species
- See text

= Dipsacus =

Genus of flowering plants in the honeysuckle family

Dipsacus is a genus of flowering plant in the family Caprifoliaceae. The members of this genus are known as teasel. The genus includes about 15 species of tall herbaceous biennial plants (rarely short-lived perennial plants) growing to 1–2.5 metres (3.3–8.2 ft) tall. Dipsacus species are native to Europe, Asia and Africa.

== Etymology ==
The genus name (Dipsacus) is derived from the Greek word for thirst (dipsa) and refers to the cup-like formation made where sessile leaves merge at the stem.

The name teasel derives from words such as Old English tǣsl, tǣsel; relating to the verb "to tease" – the dried heads of the plant were once used in the textile industry to raise the nap on woolen cloth. It was formerly also spelled teasle, teazel, and teazle.

== Description ==
Teasels are easily identified with their prickly stem and leaves, and the inflorescence of purple, dark pink, lavender or white flowers that form a head on the end of the stem(s). The inflorescence is ovoid, 4–10 centimetres (1.6–3.9 in) long and 3–5 centimetres (1.2–2.0 in) broad, with a basal whorl of spiny bracts. The first flowers begin opening in a belt around the middle of the spherical or oval flowerhead, and then open sequentially toward the top and bottom, forming two narrow belts as the flowering progresses. The dried head persists afterwards, with the small (4–6-millimetre (0.16–0.24 in)) seeds maturing in mid autumn. In rainy weather, some seeds may germinate when still in the seedhead (vivipary).

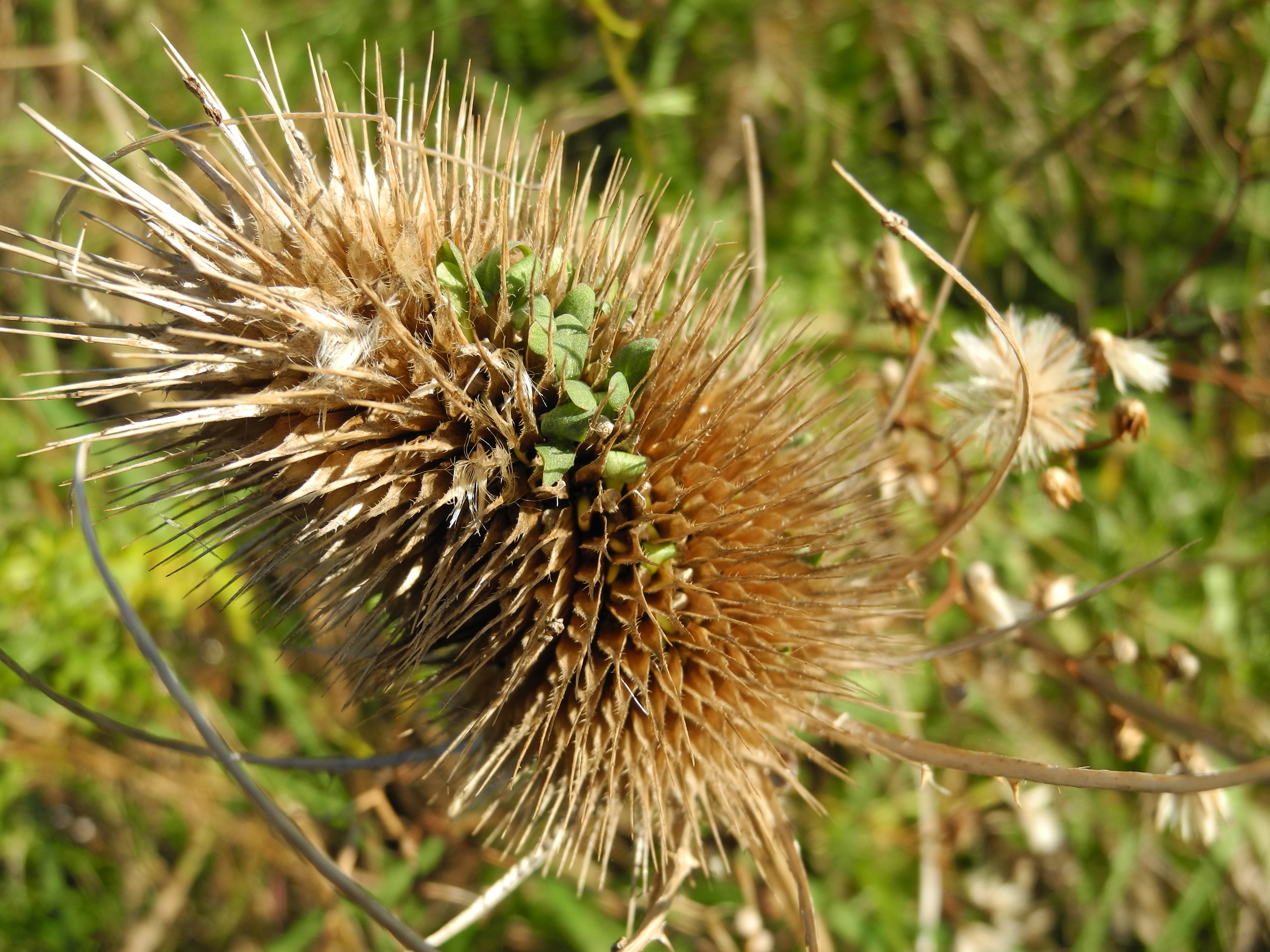
Infructescence of Dipsacus fullonum (common teasel) showing seeds germinating while still in infructescence (vivipary)

=== Carnivory ===
Carnivory in teasels was discussed by Francis Darwin (son of Charles Darwin) in a paper held by the Royal Society.

Rain water can collect in the cup-like receptacles that form where sessile leaves join the stem; this structure may perform the function of preventing sap-sucking insects such as aphids from climbing the stem. These receptacles in turn may also be used to collect the nutrients from any animal matter that accumulates within them, making them a form of protocarnivorous plant.

Contemporary attempts to replicate Darwin's experiments on the common teasel continue to fuel debate over whether or not Dipsacus is truly carnivorous. A 2011 study revealed increased seed production (but not height) dependent on both amount and nature of introduced animal supplementation, while 2019 experiments suggested that the increased seed set was a response to poor soil conditions rather than proof of proto-carnivory. The leaf shape is lanceolate, 20–40 centimetres (7.9–15.7 in) long and 3–6 centimetres (1.2–2.4 in) broad, with a row of small spines on the underside of the midrib.

=== As food ===
The seeds are an important winter food resource for some birds, notably the European goldfinch. Teasels are often grown in gardens and encouraged on some nature reserves to attract them.

=== As an invasive species ===
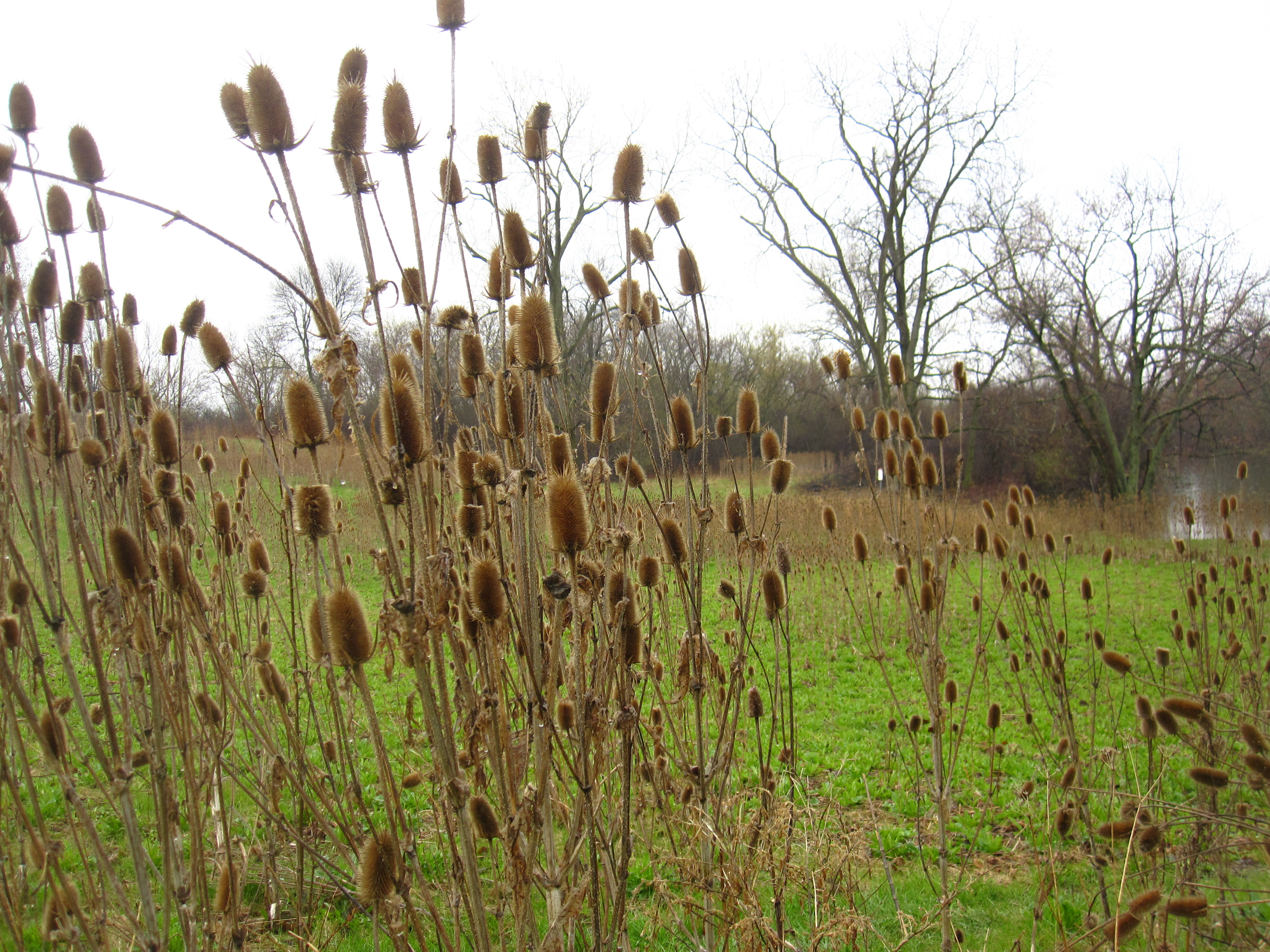
A stand of cut-leaved teasel

Teasel is considered an invasive species in the United States. It is known to form a monoculture, capable of crowding out all native plant species, and therefore is discouraged or eliminated within restored open lands and other conservation areas. Two moths useful for biological control were tested in Slovakia in 2003–2004, including the monophagous Endothenia gentianaeana, but the USDA has not approved either of them for introduction as of February 2018. Instead, the USDA continues to suggest the use of herbicidal chemicals.

== Species ==
As of June 2023, Plants of the World Online accepted the following species:

- Dipsacus asper Wall. ex DC.
- Dipsacus atratus Hook.f. & Thomson ex C.B.Clarke
- Dipsacus atropurpureus C.Y.Cheng & Z.T.Yin
- Dipsacus azureus Schrenk ex Fisch. & C.A.Mey.
- Dipsacus cephalarioides V.A.Matthews & Kupicha
- Dipsacus chinensis Batalin
- Dipsacus comosus Hoffmanns. & Link
- Dipsacus ferox Loisel. – spiny teasel
- Dipsacus fullonum L. – wild teasel, common teasel, fuller's teasel
- Dipsacus gmelinii M.Bieb.
- Dipsacus inermis Wall.
- Dipsacus japonicus Miq. – Japanese teasel, Chinese teasel
- Dipsacus laciniatus L. – cut-leaved teasel
- Dipsacus leschenaultii Coult. ex DC.
- Dipsacus narcisseanus Lawalrée
- Dipsacus pilosus L.
- Dipsacus pinnatifidus Steud. ex A.Rich.
- Dipsacus × pseudosylvestris Schur
- Dipsacus sativus (L.) Honck. – fuller's teasel (cultivated form)
- Dipsacus strigosus Willd. ex Roem. & Schult. – slim teasel
- Dipsacus valsecchii Camarda
- Dipsacus walkeri Arn.
Flowerheads
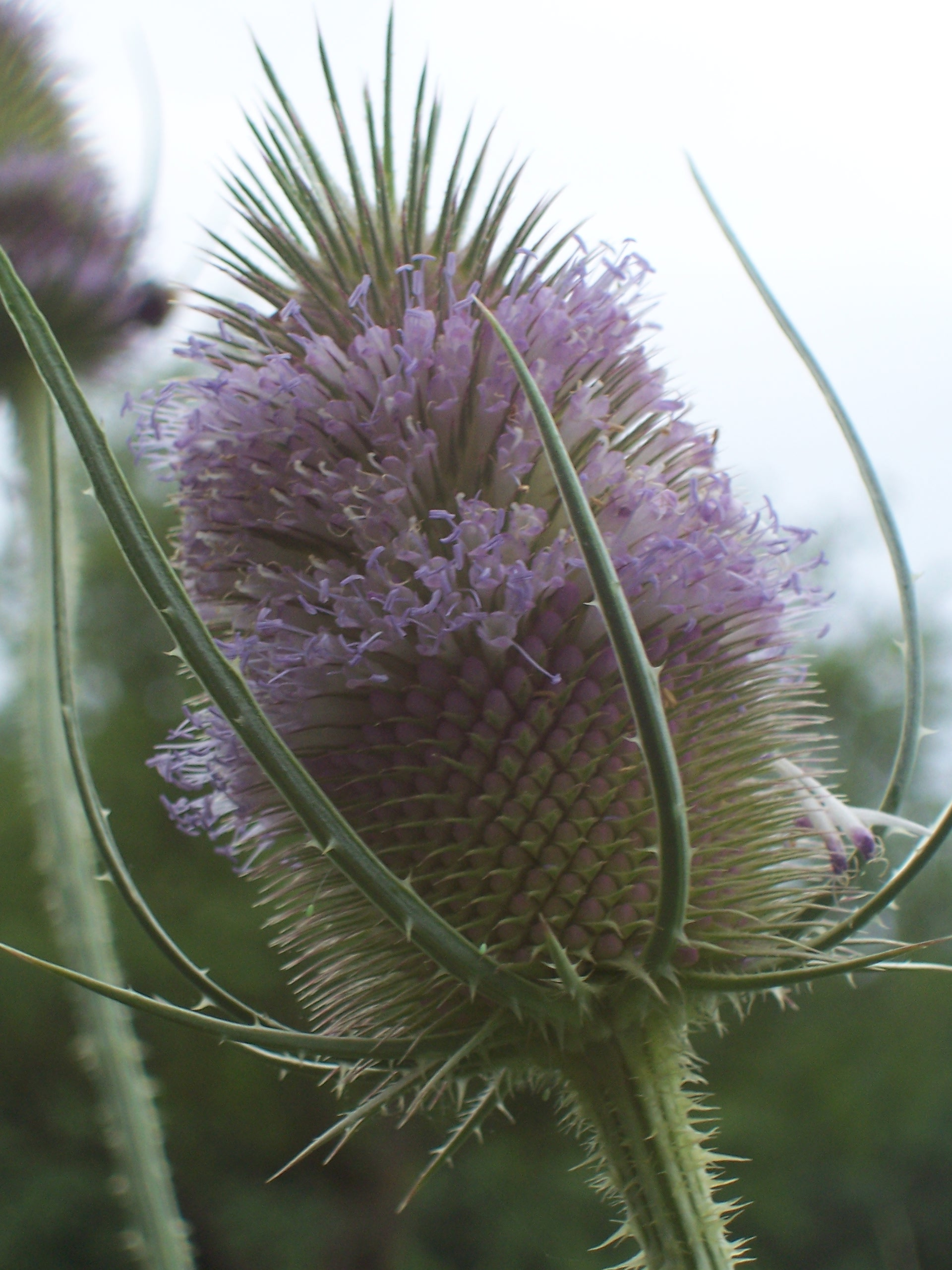
Dipsacus fullonum

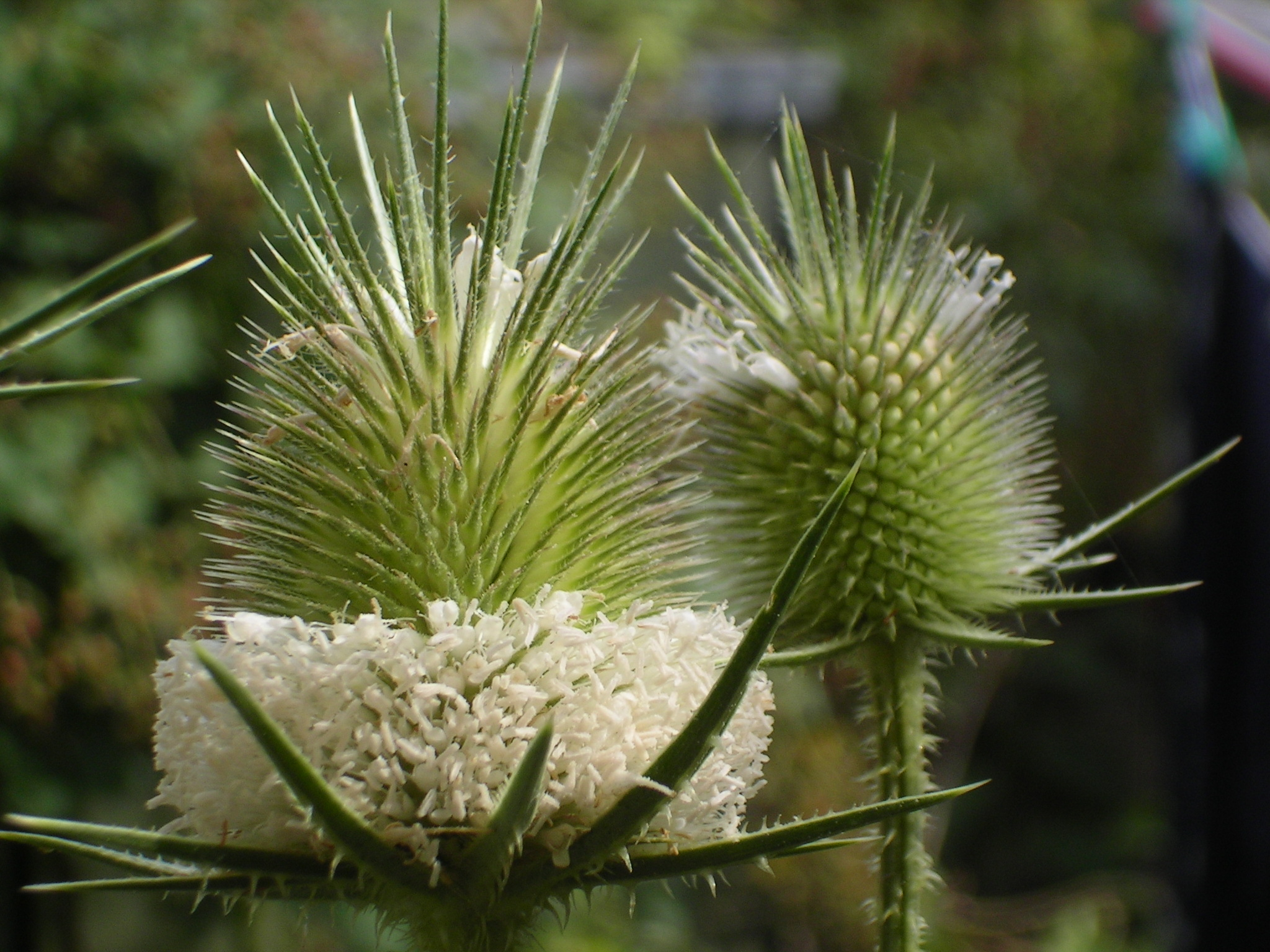
Dipsacus laciniatus

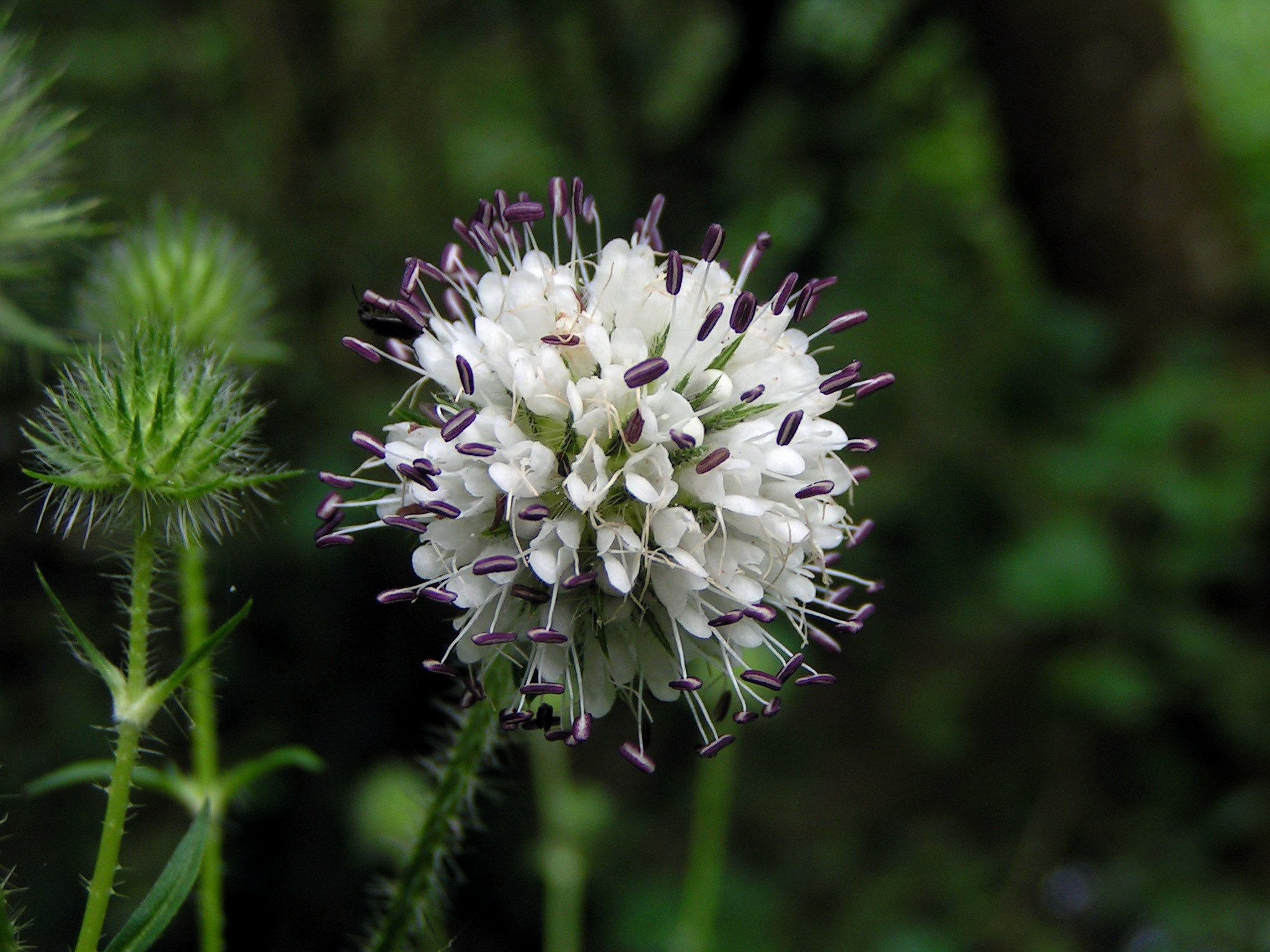
Dipsacus pilosus

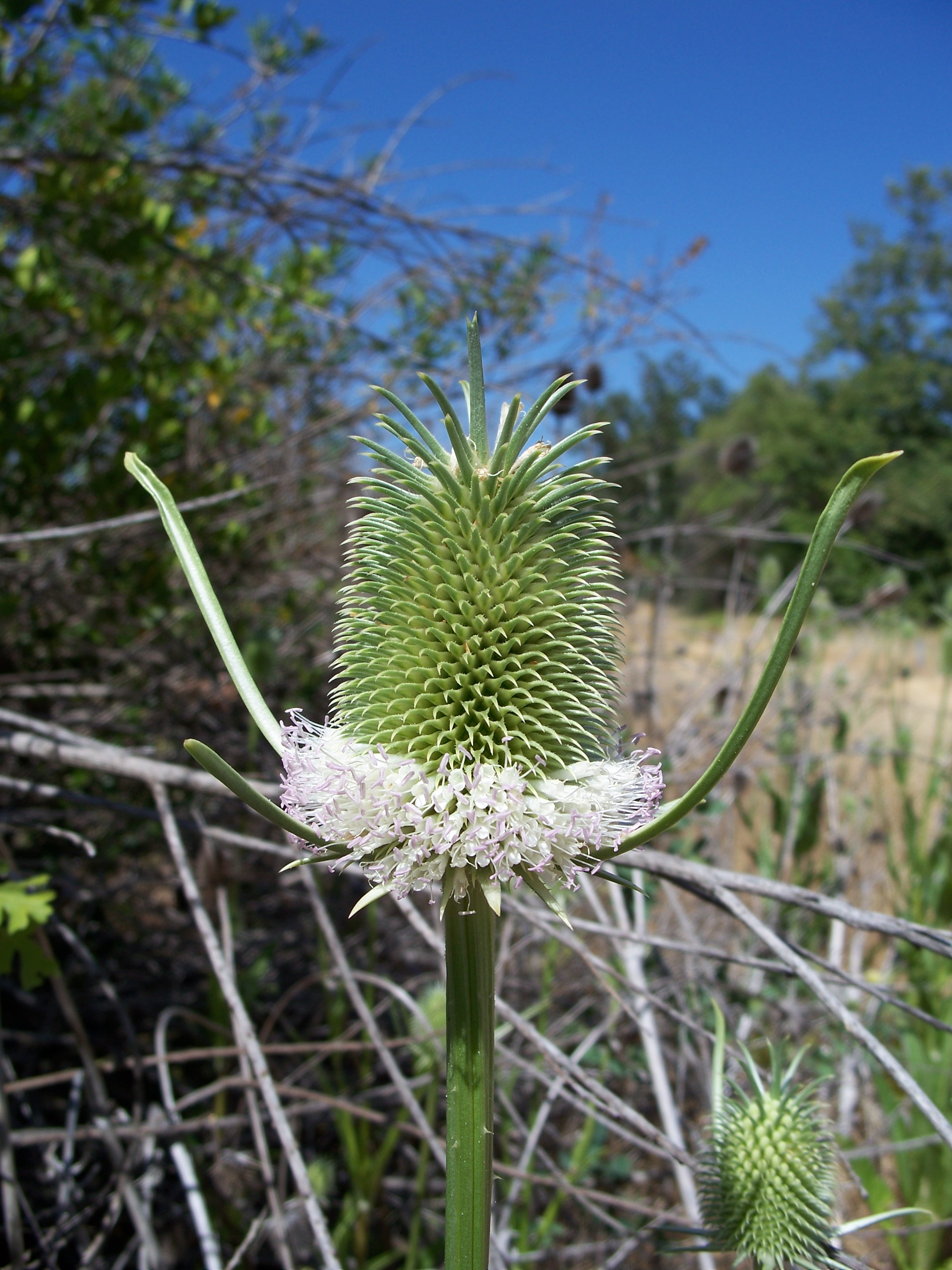
Dipsacus sativus

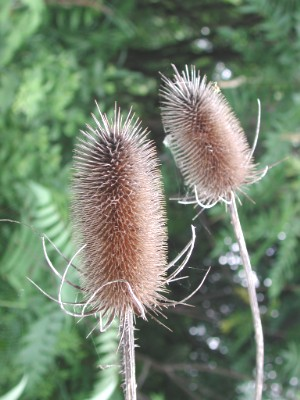
Wild teasel, dried head, Cayuga Heights, New York

== Cultivation and uses ==
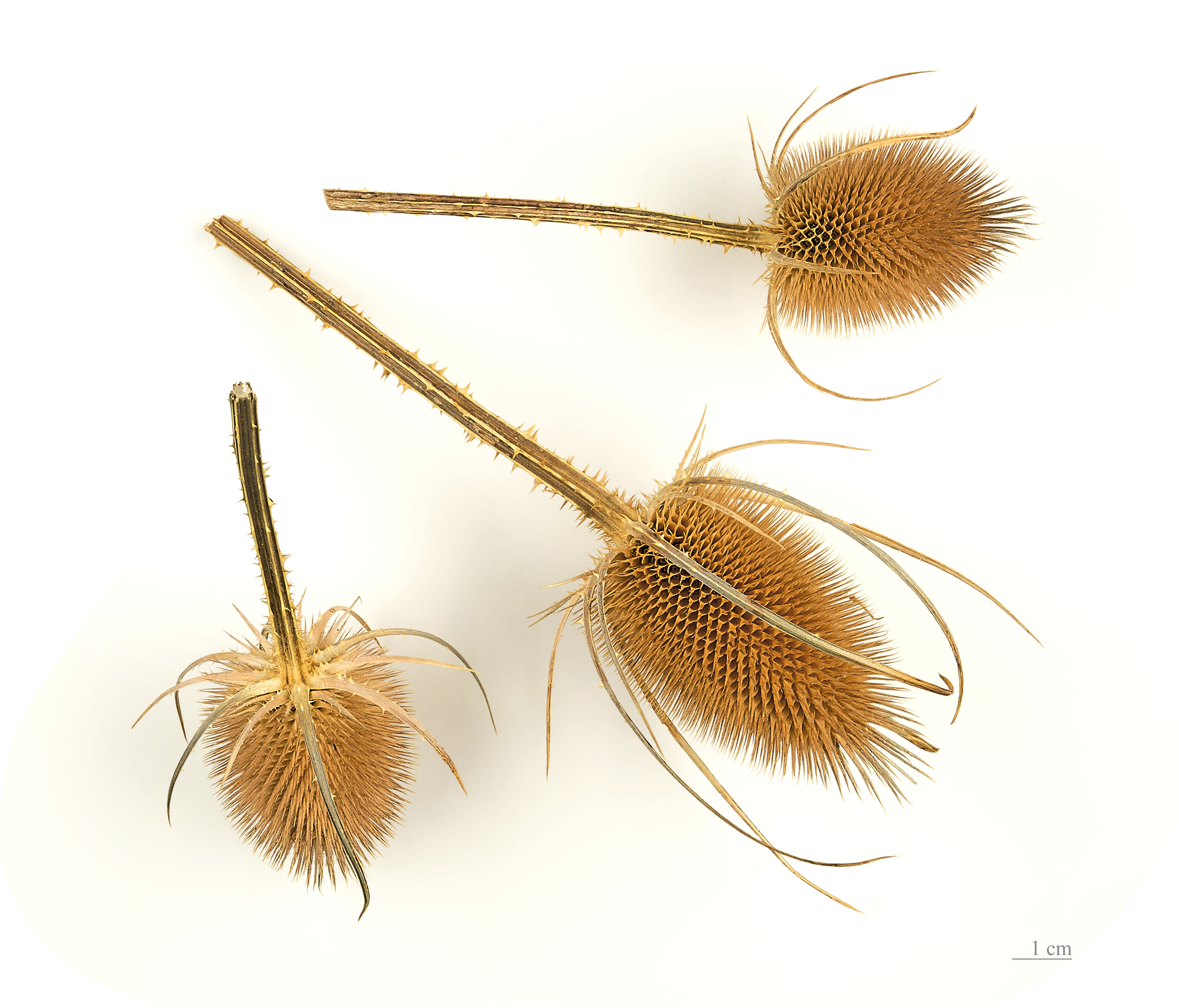
Teasel combs

Since Roman times, Fuller's teasel (the cultivar group Dipsacus fullonum Sativus Group; syn. D. sativus) was widely used in textile processing, as it provides a natural comb for cleaning, aligning and raising the nap on fabrics, particularly wool (i.e. 'fulling'). The product of the teasing process is called teased wool. The cultivar differs from the wild type in having stouter, somewhat recurved spines on the seed heads. The dried flower heads were attached to spindles, wheels, or cylinders, sometimes called teasel frames, to raise the nap on fabrics (that is, to tease the fibres). By the 20th century, teasels had been largely replaced by metal cards, which can be made uniformly and do not require constant replacement as the teasel heads wear. However, some people who weave wool still prefer to use teasels for raising the nap, claiming that the result is better; in particular, if a teasel meets serious resistance in the fabric, it will break, whereas a metal tool will rip the cloth.

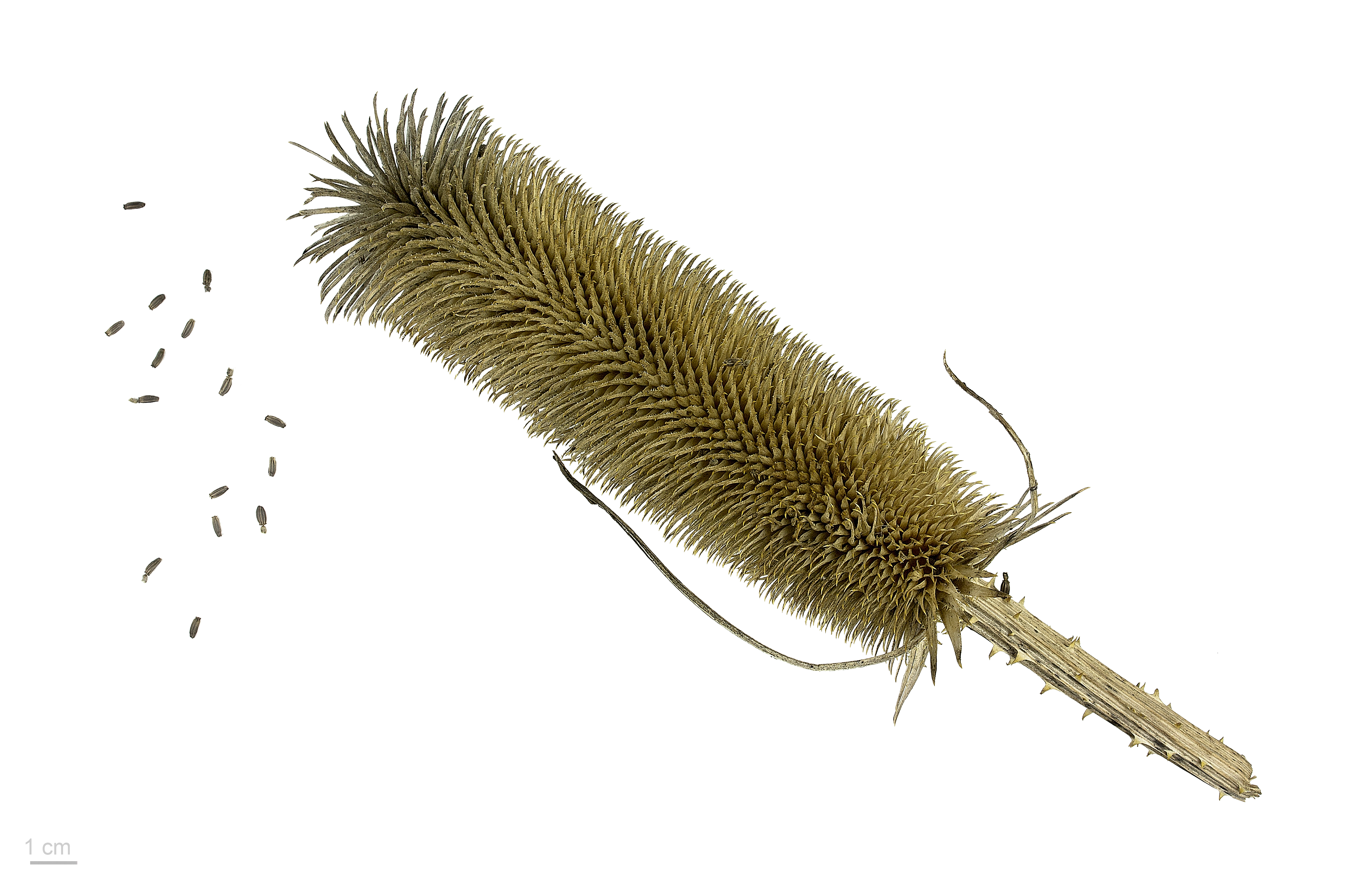
Dried teasel flower head, used to raise the nap on cloth

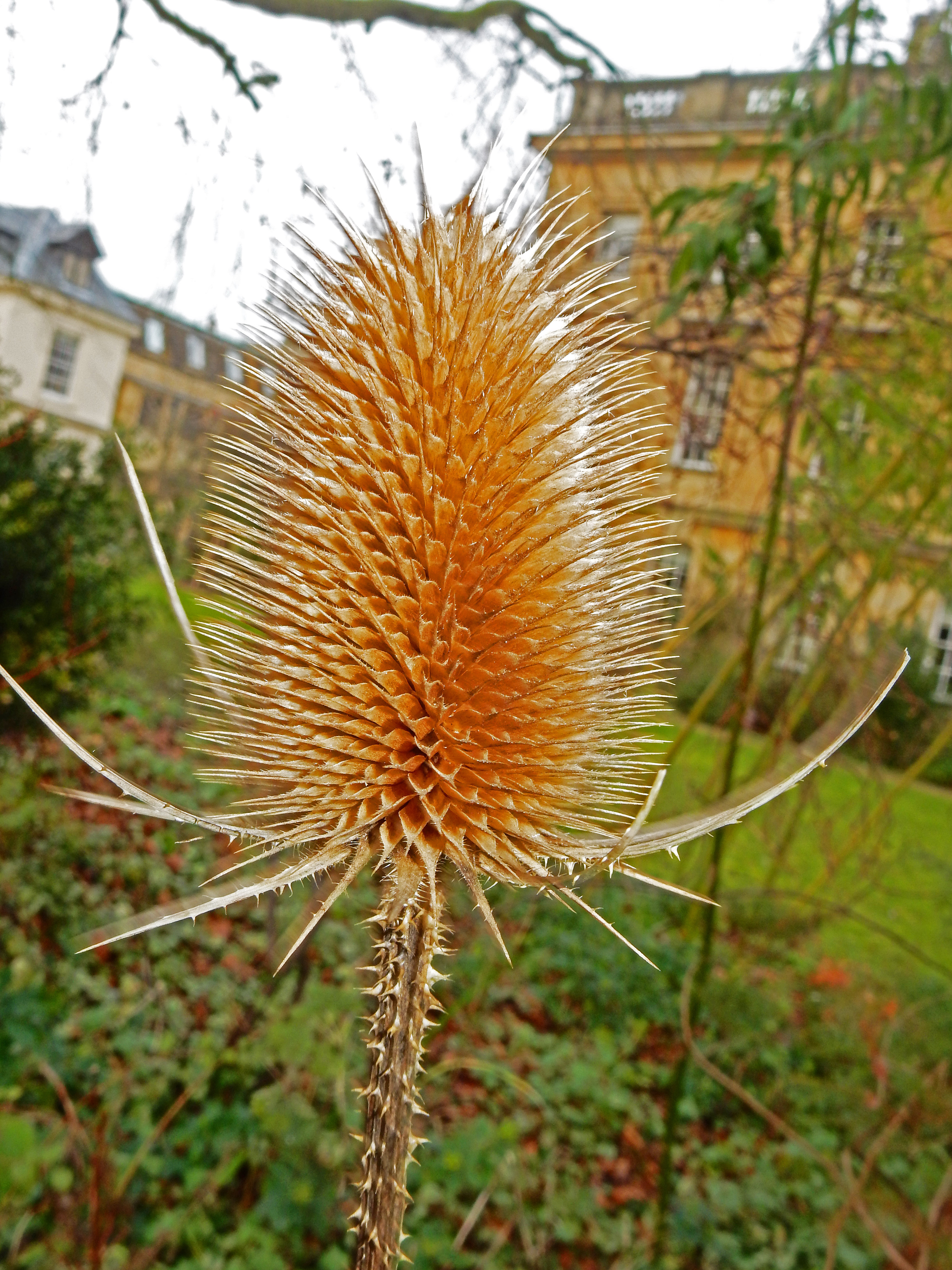
Teasel growing in the wild garden of Corpus Christi College, Oxford

Teasels are also occasionally grown as ornamental plants, and the dried heads are used in floristry.

Teasels have been naturalised in many regions away from their native range, partly due to the import of fuller's teasel for textile processing, and partly by the seed being a contaminant mixed with crop seeds.

Common teasel (Dipsacus fullonum) and cut-leaved teasel (Dipsacus laciniatus) have both been observed as invasive species in the United States. Common is more widespread, but cut-leaved is more aggressive.

Due to the chemical dipsacus saponin C, Dipsacus asper has medically significant procoagulant properties, that is likely due to an increase of intracellular calcium, and apoptosis of mitochondria. This presents a considerable risk to the average user but may be beneficial in certain circumstances.

== Phytochemistry ==
Ethanol extracts of Dipsacus asper contain phenolic acids including caffeic acid, 2,6-dihydroxycinnamic acid, vanillic acid, 2′-O-caffeoyl-D-glucopyranoside ester, and caffeoylquinic acid, iridoid glucosides, triterpenoids oleanic acid and akebiasaponin D.
