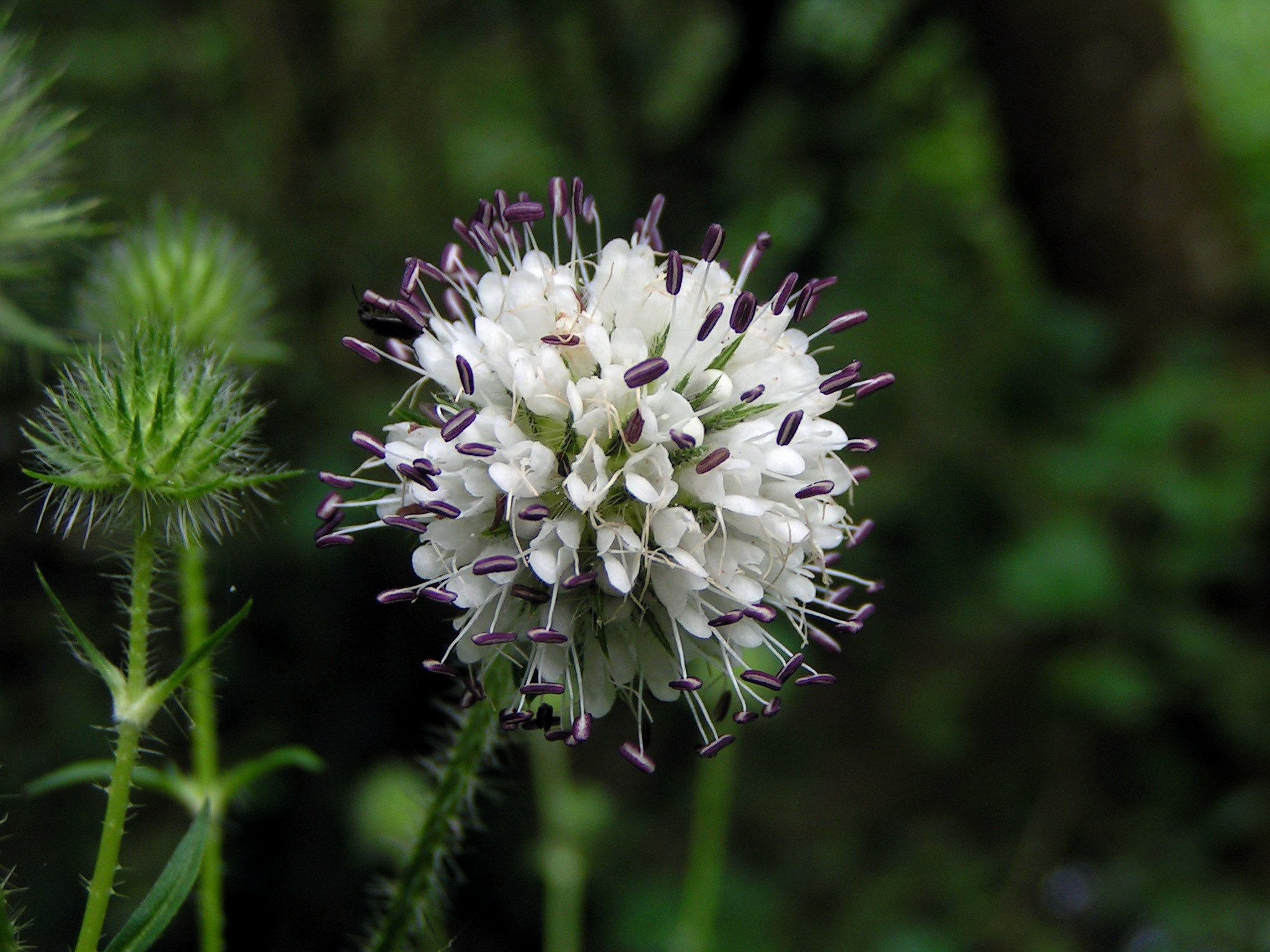

Scientific classification
- Kingdom: Plantae
- Clade: Tracheophytes
- Clade: Angiosperms
- Clade: Eudicots
- Clade: Asterids
- Order: Dipsacales
- Family: Caprifoliaceae
- Genus: Dipsacus
- Species: D. pilosus

Binomial name
- Dipsacus pilosus L.

Synonyms
- Acaenops pilosus (L.) Fourr.; Acaenops vulgaris Schrad. ex Steud.; Cephalaria appendiculata Schrad. ex Roem. & Schult.; Cephalaria pilosa Gren. & Godr.; Dipsacella pilosa (L.) Soják; Dipsacella setigera Opiz; Dipsacus elongatus Salisb.; Dipsacus minor Neck.; Galedragon pilosus Gray; Virga pilosa Hill

= Dipsacus pilosus =

Species of flowering plant

Dipsacus pilosus, or small teasel, is a species of biennial flowering plant in the family Caprifoliaceae. The epithet small refers to the flower heads which are smaller, globular and made up of white flowers with violet anthers and woolly spines.

Flowers from July to September.

Small teasel prefers damp, calcareous soils especially along woodland edges and clearings but is also found along hedgerows and the banks of streams and rivers. Although often found amongst tall vegetation the seeds of small teasel require disturbance for germination. It therefore requires a habitat subject to occasional management if it is to persist.

Seeds germinate best in the autumn.
