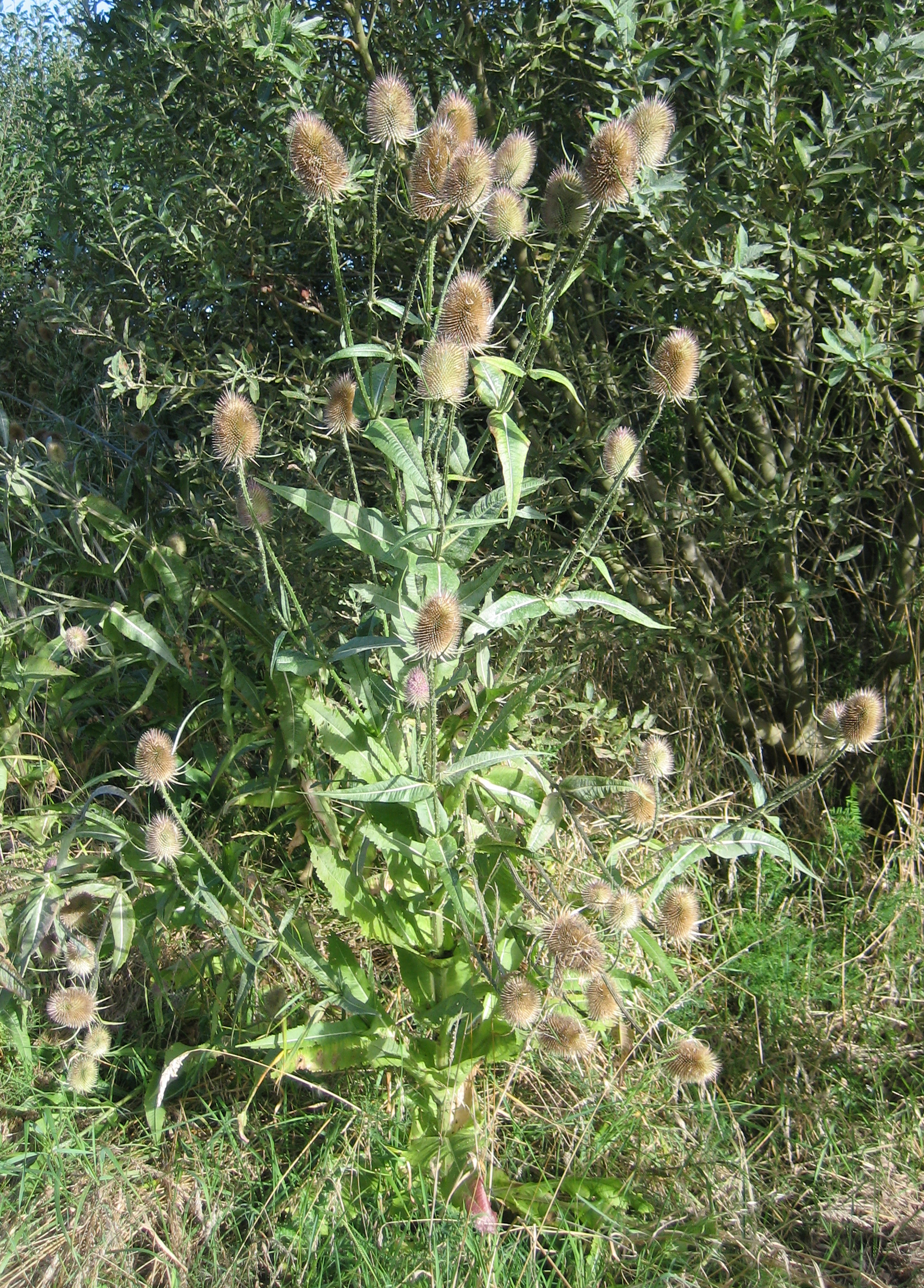

Scientific classification
- Kingdom: Plantae
- Clade: Tracheophytes
- Clade: Angiosperms
- Clade: Eudicots
- Clade: Asterids
- Order: Dipsacales
- Family: Caprifoliaceae
- Genus: Dipsacus
- Species: D. fullonum

Binomial name
- Dipsacus fullonum L.

Synonyms
- List: Dipsacus arcimusci Lojac.; Dipsacus botterii Maly ex Nyman; Dipsacus carminatorius Salisb.; Dipsacus connatofolius Gilib. nom. inval.; Dipsacus divaricatus C.Presl; Dipsacus horridus Opiz; Dipsacus meyeri Chabert; Dipsacus mirabilis Gand.; Dipsacus morisonii Boreau; Dipsacus orsini Sanguin.; Dipsacus palustris Salisb.; Dipsacus purpurascens Gand.; Dipsacus silvester A.Kern.; Dipsacus sinuatus Schltdl. ex Roem. & Schult.; Dipsacus sylvestris Huds.; Dipsacus vulgaris C.C.Gmel.

= Dipsacus fullonum =

Wild teasel

Species of flowering plant

Dipsacus fullonum, syn. Dipsacus sylvestris, is a species of flowering plant known by the common names wild teasel or fuller's teasel, although the latter name is usually applied to the cultivated variety D. fullonum var. sativus. It is native to Eurasia and North Africa, but it is known in the Americas, southern Africa, Australia and New Zealand as an introduced species.

It is a herbaceous biennial plant (rarely a short-lived perennial plant) growing to 1–2.5 metres (3.3–8.2 ft) tall. The inflorescence is a cylindrical array of lavender flowers which dries to a cone of spine-tipped hard bracts. It may be 10 centimetres (3.9 in) long. The dried inflorescence of a cultivar was historically used in textile manufacturing as a tool for fulling.

== Description ==
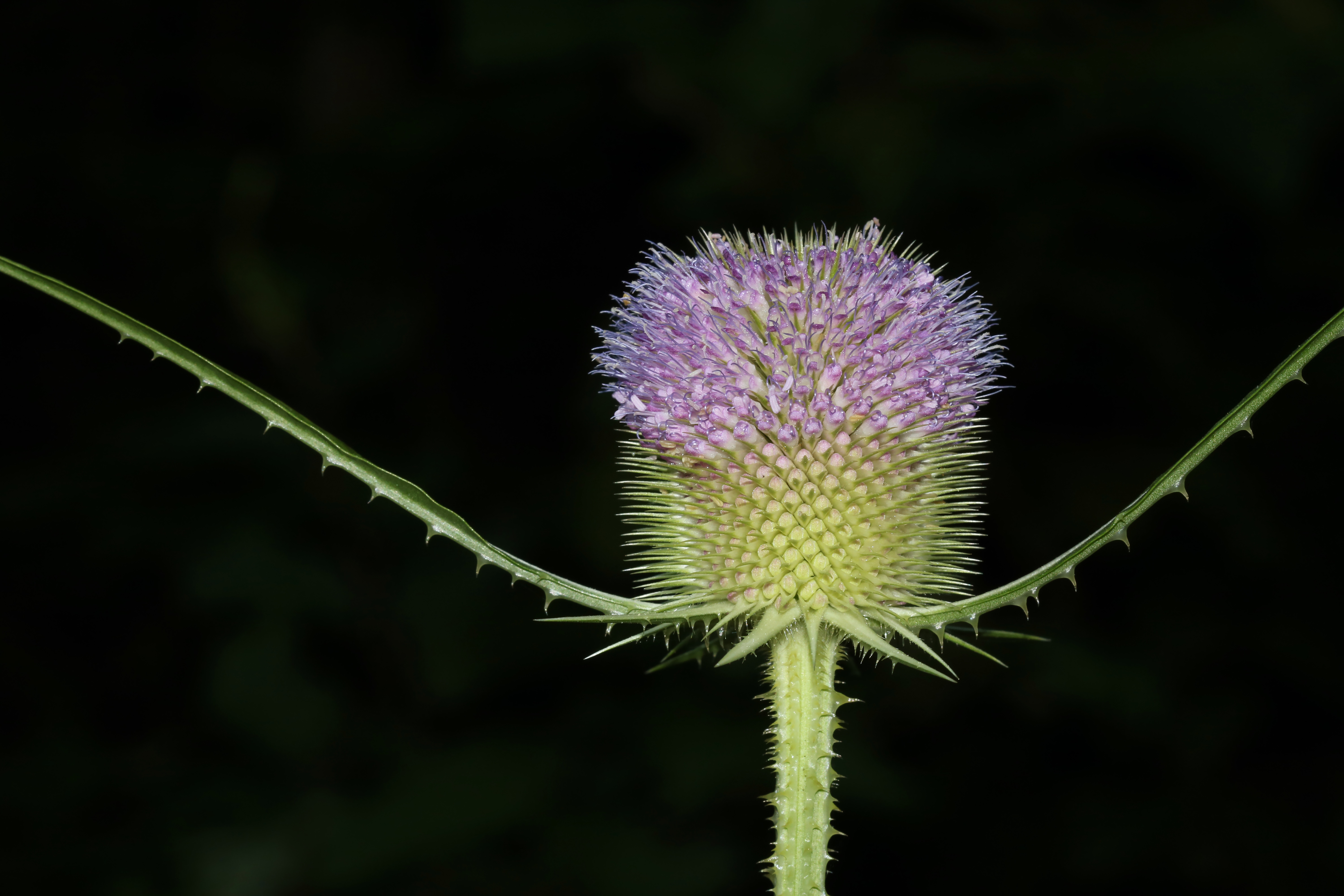
Flowers and head, Vinnytsia Raion, Ukraine

Teasels are easily identified with their prickly stem and leaves, and the inflorescence of purple, dark pink or lavender flowers that form a head on the end of the stem(s). The inflorescence is ovoid, 4–10 centimetres (1.6–3.9 in) long and 3–5 centimetres (1.2–2.0 in) broad, with a basal whorl of spiny bracts. The first flowers begin opening in a belt around the middle of the spherical or oval flowerhead, and then open sequentially toward the top and bottom, forming two narrow belts as the flowering progresses. The dried head persists afterwards, with the small (4–6 millimetres or 0.16–0.24 inches) seeds maturing in mid-autumn.

Sessile leaves merge at the stem, creating a cup-like receptacle where rain water may collect.This may perform the function of preventing sap-sucking insects such as aphids from climbing the stem. The genus name is derived from the word for thirst, referring to this cup-like formation. The leaf shape is lanceolate, 20–40 centimetres (7.9–15.7 in) long and 3–6 centimetres (1.2–2.4 in) broad, with a row of small spines on the underside of the midrib.

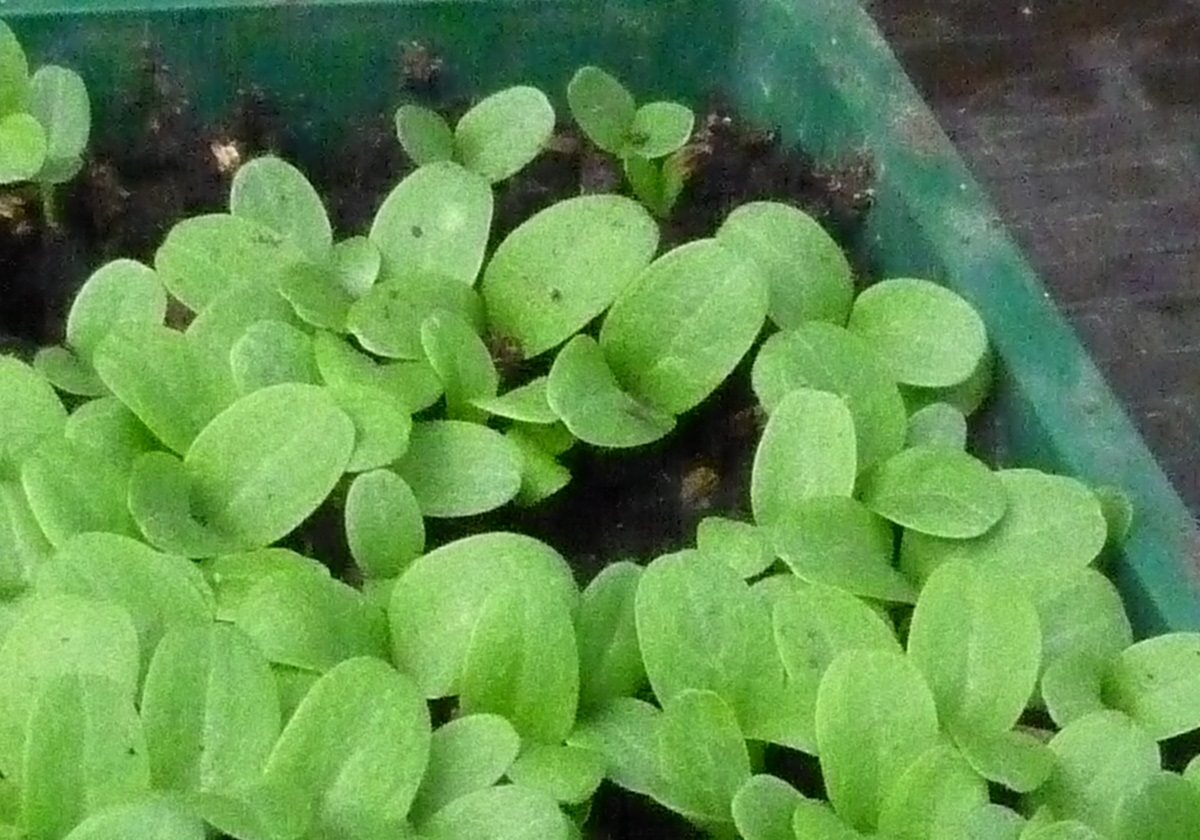
Seedling

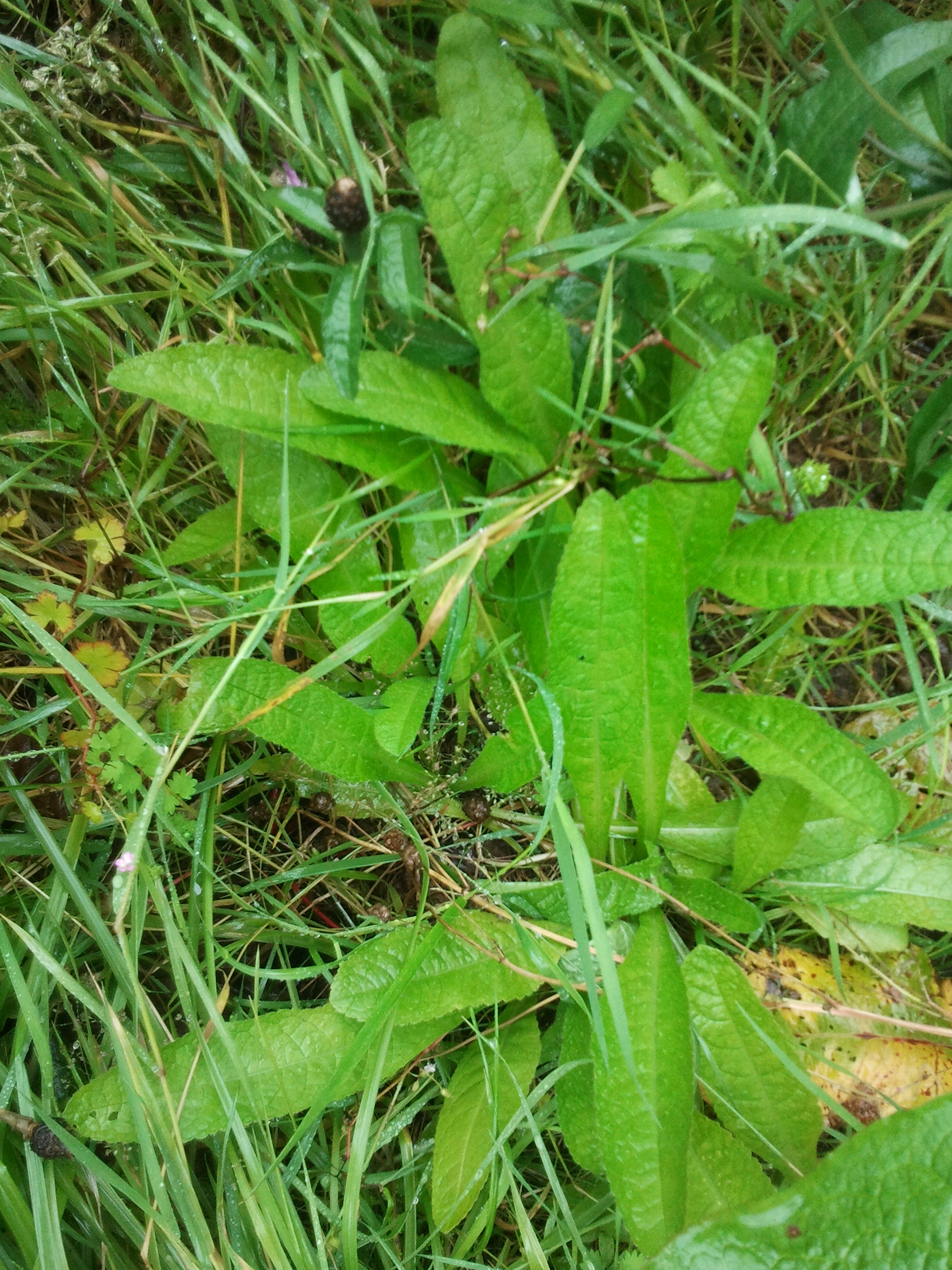
Youngish leaf low to the ground, before flower stem development

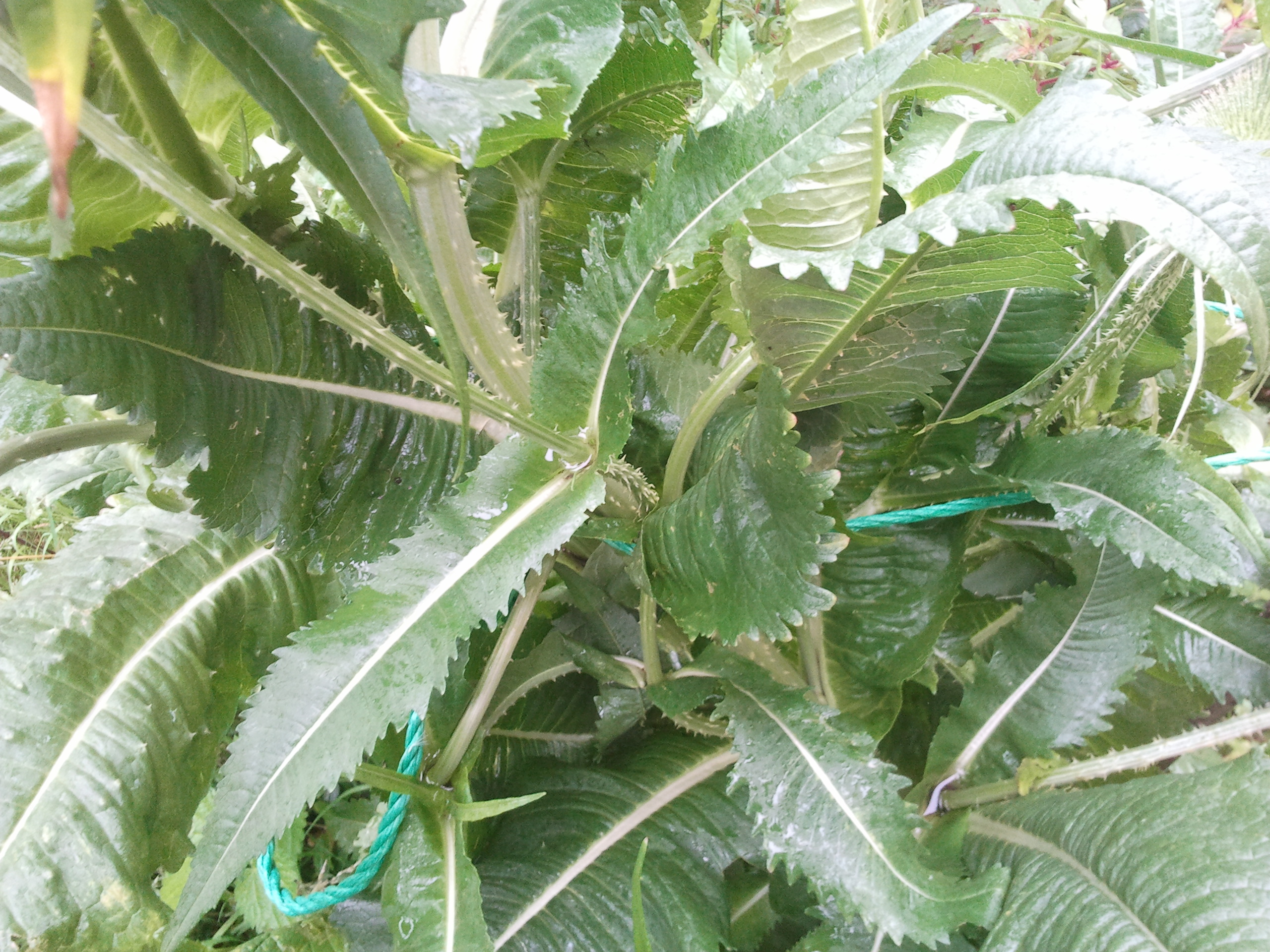
Leaves after flower stem development, high on stem

Comb

== Ecology ==
The seeds are an important winter food resource for some birds, notably the European goldfinch. Teasels are often grown in gardens and encouraged on some nature reserves to attract them.

Carnivory in teasels was discussed by Francis Darwin (son of Charles Darwin) in a paper held by the Royal Society. Contemporary attempts to replicate Darwin's experiments on the common teasel continue to fuel debate over whether or not Dipsacus is truly carnivorous. A 2011 study revealed increased seed production (but not height) dependent on both amount and nature of introduced animal supplementation, while 2019 experiments suggested that the increased seed set was a response to poor soil conditions rather than proof of proto-carnivory.

== Uses ==
The fuller's teasel (the cultivar group Dipsacus fullonum Sativus Group; syn. D. sativus) was formerly widely used in textile processing, providing a natural comb for cleaning, aligning and raising the nap on fabrics, particularly wool (i.e. 'fulling'). It differs from the wild type in having stouter, somewhat recurved spines on the seed heads. The dried flower heads were attached to spindles, wheels, or cylinders, sometimes called teasel frames, to raise the nap on fabrics (that is, to tease the fibres). By the 20th century, teasels were largely replaced by metal cards, which could be made uniform and do not require constant replacement as the teasel heads wear. However, some people who weave wool still prefer to use teasels for raising the nap, claiming that the result is better; in particular, if a teasel meets serious resistance in the fabric, it will break, whereas a metal tool would rip the cloth.

Teasels are occasionally grown as ornamental plants, and the dried heads are used in floristry.

== Invasive species ==
Teasels have been naturalised in many regions away from their native range, partly due to the import of fuller's teasel for textile processing, and partly by the seed being a contaminant mixed with crop seeds. It can sometimes become a noxious weed outside its native range. It forms large monocultures (displacing other species) in areas it invades that have favourable climates and none of the species which feed upon it in its native range.

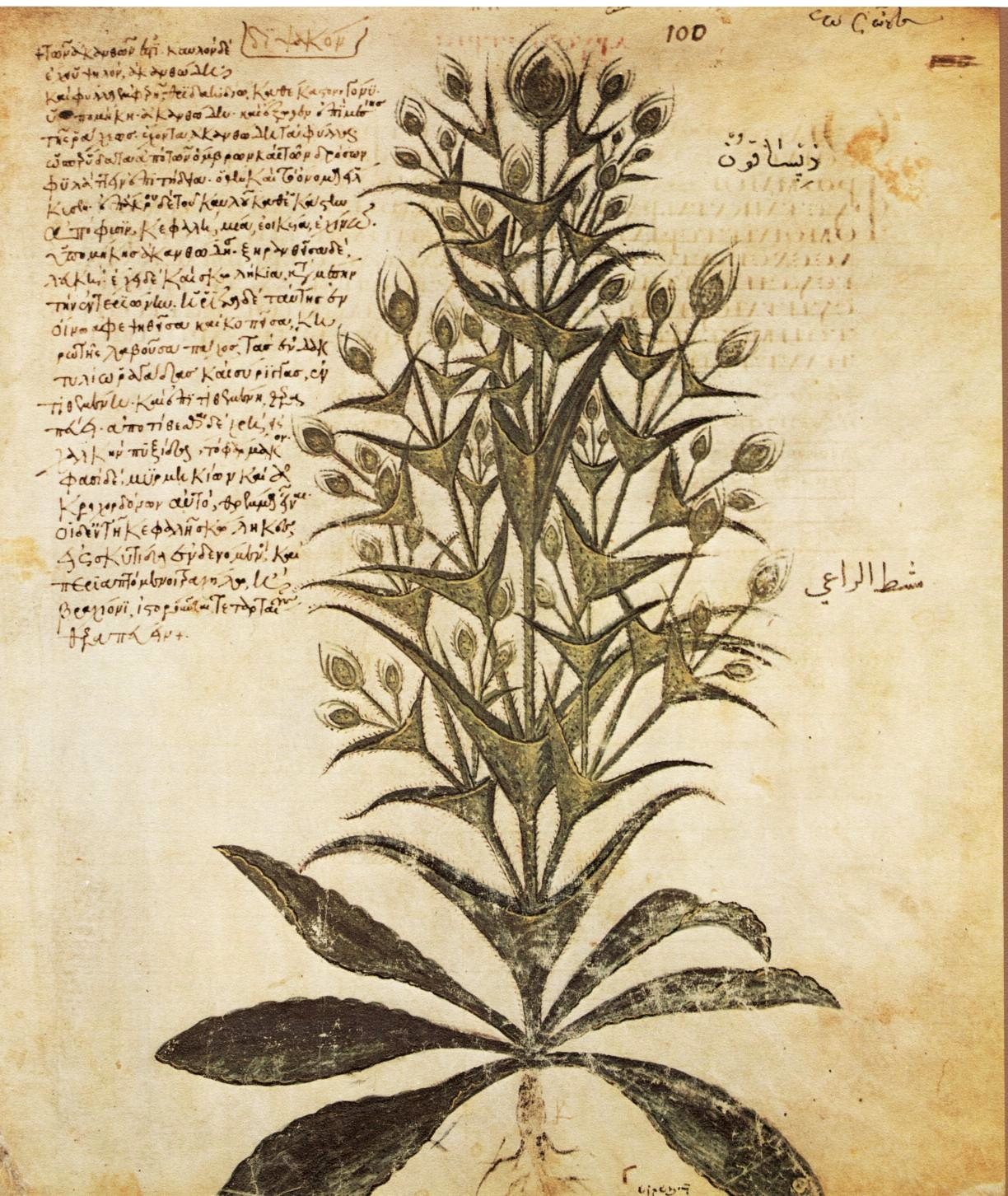
D. fullonum is identifiable in the 6th-century Vienna Dioscurides, fol. 99

Two moths potentially useful for biological control were tested in Slovakia in 2003-2004 (following the identification of seven insects associated with the plant), including the monophagous Endothenia gentianaeana. E. gentianaeana was able to be reared in high numbers and it was found in nearly 100% of teasel plants surveyed in Slovakia, but the second moth, Cochylis roseana was not targeted by local parasitic wasps as frequently as was Endothenia gentianaeana and caused a higher level of damage.

== Gallery ==
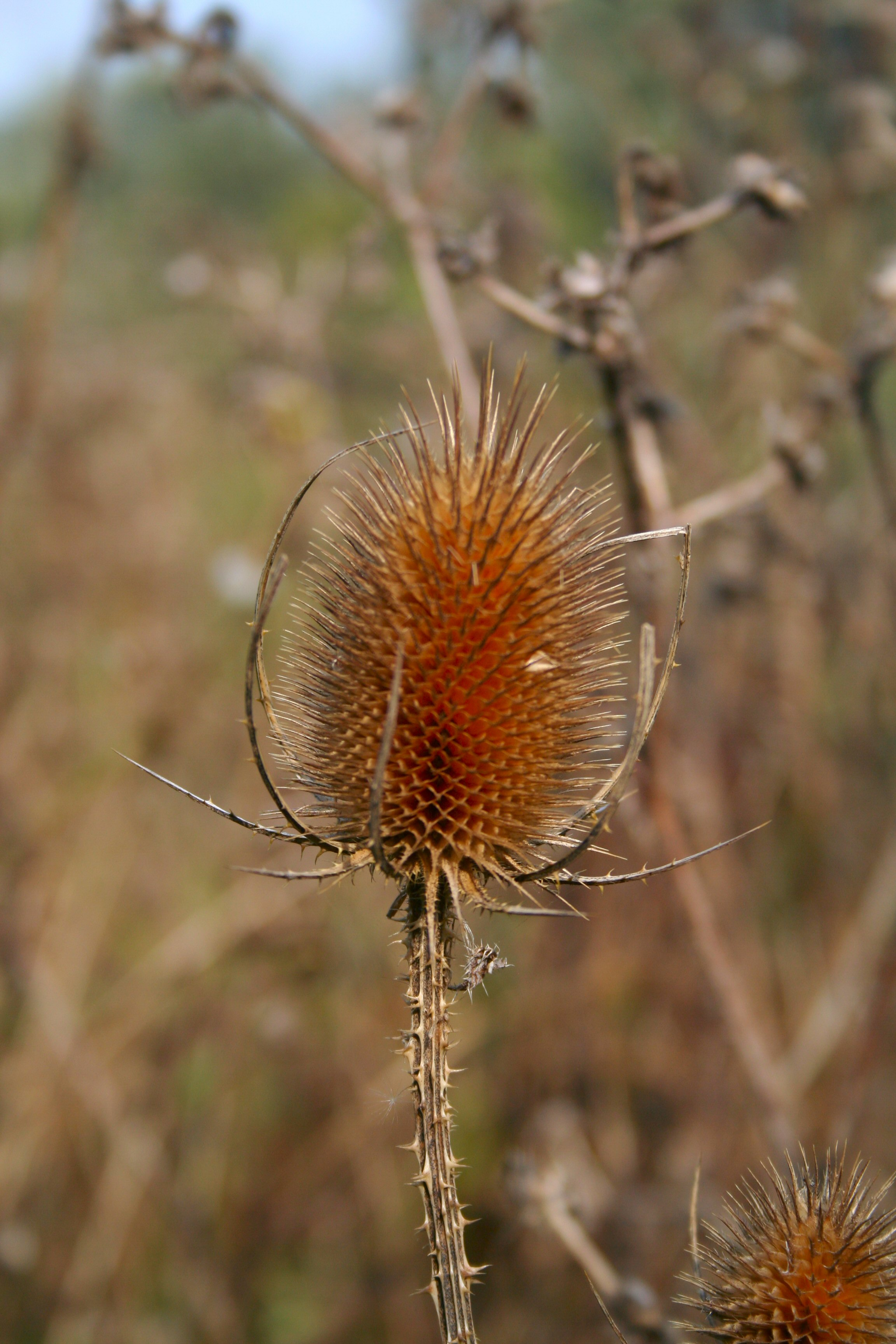
Teasel comb

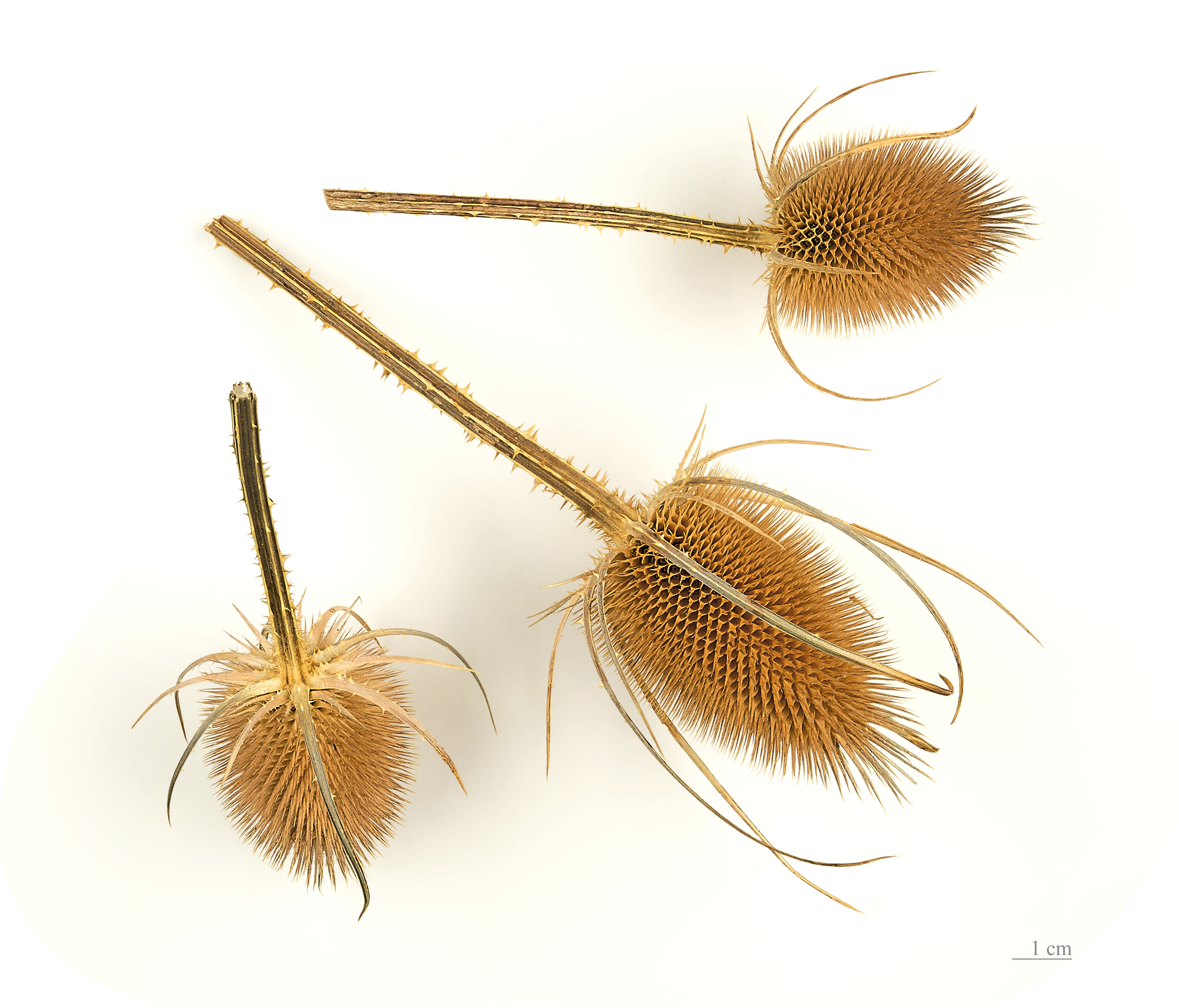
Dried teasel flower heads, used to raise the nap on cloth

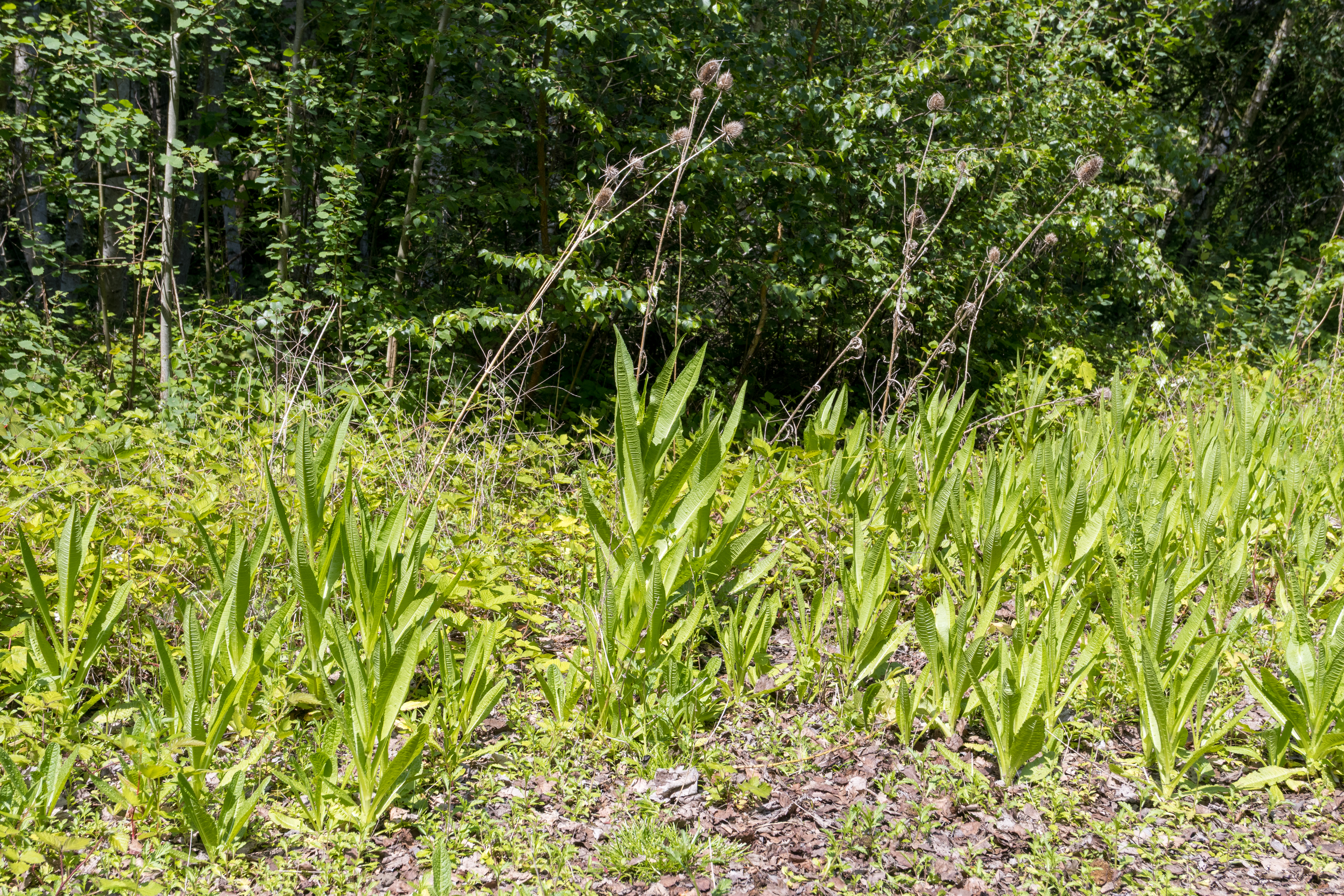
Fitotelma de Dipsacus fullonum
