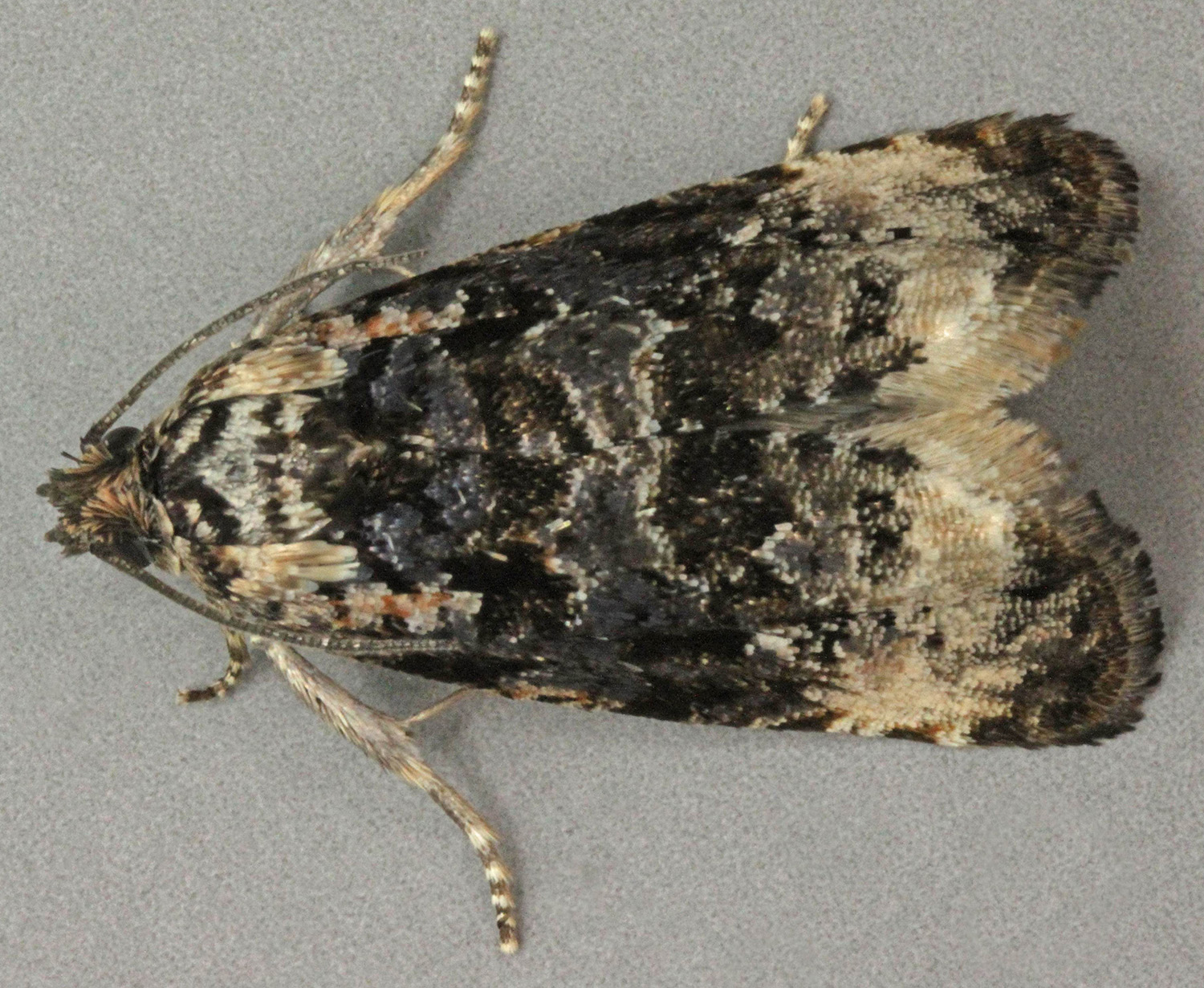

Scientific classification
- Domain: Eukaryota
- Kingdom: Animalia
- Phylum: Arthropoda
- Class: Insecta
- Order: Lepidoptera
- Family: Tortricidae
- Genus: Endothenia
- Species: E. gentianaeana

Binomial name
- Endothenia gentianaeana (Hubner, 1799)

Synonyms
- Tortrix gentianaeana Hubner, 1799; Penthina oblongana var. adelana Rebel, 1892; Grapholitha desertana Staudinger, 1880; Eucosma eremodora Meyrick, 1932; Apotomis gentianana Hubner, 1816; Penthina sellana var. oxybiana Milliere, 1874; Tortrix sellana Frolich, 1828

= Endothenia gentianaeana =

Species of moth

Endothenia gentianaeana is a moth of the family Tortricidae. It is found from most of Europe, east to Korea and the Near East. It is also found in North America and Hawaii.

The wingspan is 15–19 mm. Adults are on wing in June and July in western Europe.

The larvae feed on the pith of the seedhead of Dipsacus fullonum (a teasel).

This species was identified as a strong candidate by researchers in Slovakia (2003-2004) who were looking for useful biological control agents, as teasels are strongly-invasive weeds in some areas outside of their native range, such as parts the United States' Midwest. As it only feeds on teasel this moth carries little of the risk the introduction of new species can carry in terms of unwanted predation of other, non-target species. The researchers were able to rear large numbers of caterpillars in their testing and also identified this species as being present on nearly 100% of the teasel plants identified in the field. Despite this result, the USDA has not approved this moth for introduction as of February 2018 and it does not appear to be under further consideration.
