= Tidenham railway station =

Former railway station in Gloucestershire, England

Coordinates: 51.6561°N 2.6480°W

Tidenham Station

General information
- Location: Tidenham, Forest of Dean, Gloucestershire; England
- Platforms: 1

Other information
- Status: Disused

History
- Original company: Wye Valley Railway
- Pre-grouping: Great Western Railway

Key dates
- November 1876: Station opened
- 1 January 1917: Station closed to passengers
- 1 February 1918: Station re-opened
- 5 January 1959: Station closed for passengers
- c.1990: closed completely
Location

Tidenham Station was the station for the village of Tidenham on the former Wye Valley Railway in the Forest of Dean, Gloucestershire, England. It was opened in 1876 during the construction of the line and closed on 5 January 1959 following the closure of the line to passenger services. The next station on the line was Netherhope Halt.

== History ==
Tidenham Station was the first station after Wye Valley Junction on the Wye Valley Railway. It was opened in November 1876 as one of the four main stations on the line, the others being Tintern, St. Briavels and Redbrook on Wye. It consisted of a loop, signal box, platform and station building.

Tidenham Station became the first station to close on the line on 1 January 1917; this was a wartime measure to release staff and the station was re-opened on 1 February 1918.

The station closed completely in 1959 due to the withdrawal of passenger services on the line. It was converted into a loading bay for the nearby Dayhouse Quarry and was used until c. 1990. It was the last section to be closed on the Wye Valley Railway.

Preceding station	Disused railways	Following station
Tutshill for Beachley Halt	British Railways; Wye Valley Railway	Netherhope Halt
