= Redbrook on Wye railway station =

Former railway station in Gloucestershire, England

Coordinates: 51.7876°N 2.6748°W

Redbrook on Wye
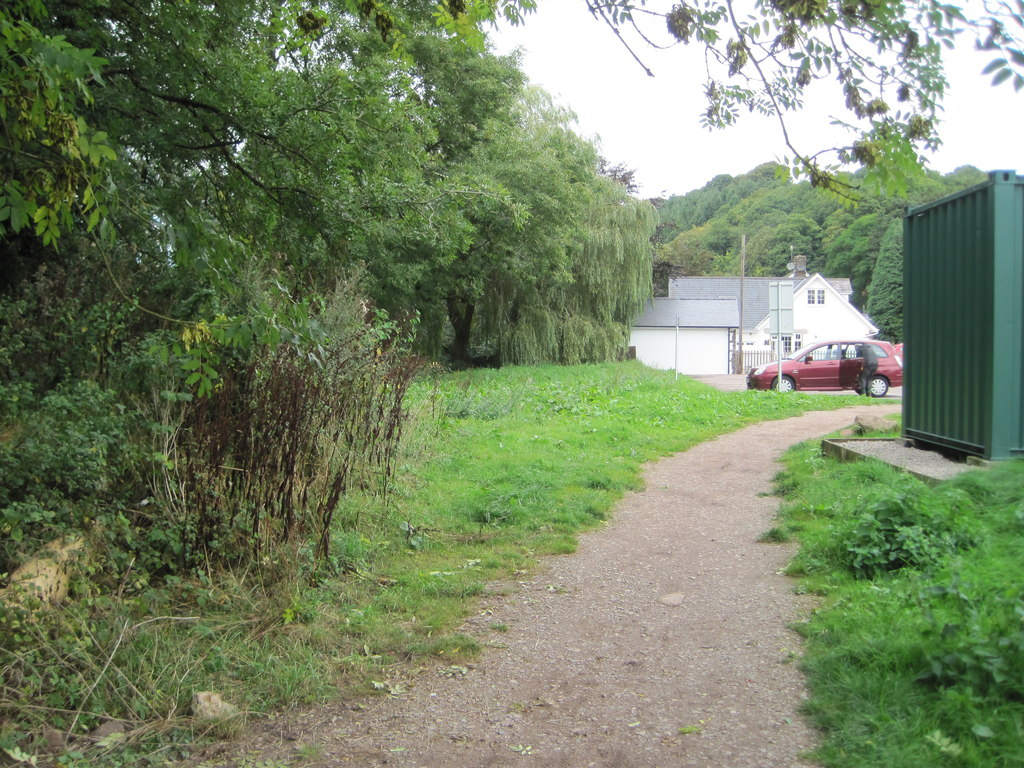
- The site of the station in 2013

General information
- Location: Redbrook, Forest of Dean; England
- Grid reference: SO536100
- Platforms: 1

Other information
- Status: Disused

History
- Original company: Wye Valley Railway
- Pre-grouping: Great Western Railway
- Post-grouping: Great Western Railway

Key dates
- November 1876: Station opened
- January 1959: Station closed to passengers
- January 1964: Station closed completely
Location

Redbrook on Wye railway station was a station serving the village of Redbrook on the now disused Wye Valley Railway. It was opened on 1 November 1876 with the rest of the line and remained open for 83 years, it closed in 1959. The sidings and passing loop remained open until late 1961 to serve the Tinplate Works in the village.

== History ==
The station was opened in 1876 as one of the four stopping places on the line, the others were Tidenham Station, Tintern Station and St. Briavels Station. The station complex consisted of a platform, station building, goods shed, signal box, passing loop and sidings; the signal box controlled the loop and sidings. The signal box was only used when needed as the sidings were only occasionally used.

Throughout its life, the station won many awards for its flowers and decorations, its climbing roses especially. The staff were often in competition with Tintern Station to be the best kept station on the line.

Nine years after the station's opening, a new company re-opened the old Tinplate Works. The Shareholders of the railway were informed that the new tinplate company would provide a reliable source of income. The Tinplate Works managed to produce a steady amount until it finally closed in 1961. The railway was completely demolished soon afterwards to make room for a restaurant. However, Penallt Viaduct, which led up to the station is still standing, it now carries a public footpath over the Wye.

Preceding station	Disused railways	Following station
Penallt Halt	British Railways; Wye Valley Railway	Wyesham Halt
