= Penallt Viaduct =

Disused viaduct over the River Wye between England and Wales

Coordinates: 51.78526°N 2.67382°W

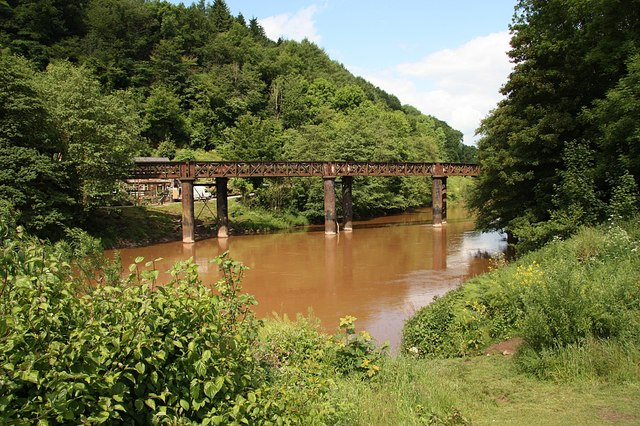
Penallt Viaduct, as seen from Lower Redbrook

Penallt Viaduct, also known as Redbrook Bridge, is a disused railway viaduct across the River Wye between England and Wales. It spans the river just south-east of Monmouth, between Penallt, in Monmouthshire, on the Welsh side, and Redbrook, in Gloucestershire, on the English side. It is located within the Wye Valley Area of Outstanding Natural Beauty (AONB). It formerly carried the Wye Valley Railway. The route opened on 1 November 1876.

== Design ==
The viaduct is a single-track structure of five wrought-iron lattice girder spans supported on four pairs of cast-iron columns which have X-shaped bracing between them. Each span is a separate girder and the piers are at right angles to the river current, giving the bridge a sharp skew. A steel footbridge on concrete supports, attached to the viaduct on the upstream side by steel brackets, was added in 1955.

It is located between the former Redbrook on Wye and Penallt Halt stations. Passenger services ceased on the railway in 1959 and it closed to freight in January 1964. The footbridge was jointly provided by the pre-1974 Monmouthshire and Gloucestershire County Councils who agreed in 1953 to pay for the construction of the footbridge attached to the viaduct.

== History ==
The bridge was built from 1875 and opened in 1876 for the Monmouth and Wye Valley Railway, which was later absorbed into the Great Western Railway. It was designed by the engineers S. H. Yockney and Son of Westminster, and built by the contractors Reed Brothers of London. The line closed to passenger services in 1959 and freight in 1964 but the footbridge remained open to provide a pedestrian route across the river and between the two villages. It is part of the Wye Valley Walk long-distance footpath. In 2012, it and two other nearby former railway bridges over the Wye—one at Lydbrook and the Tintern Wireworks Bridge—underwent a condition survey as part of a project to explore possible future uses. The survey was followed by a public consultation, organised by the Wye Valley AONB authorities. Proposals emerged the following year for restoration and conservation which was estimated to cost £600,000–£900,000.

The bridge is a Grade II listed building in both England and Wales; it was first designated in England on 24 September 1984 and in Wales on 28 February 2001. The Welsh designation notes the reason for the listing as "unusually interesting survival of an all metal railway bridge dating from 1876 in an exceptional location".

== See also ==
- List of crossings of the River Wye
- List of railway bridges and viaducts in the United Kingdom
