= Tutshill for Beachley Halt railway station =

Former railway station in England

Coordinates: 51.6466°N 2.6590°W

Tutshill for Beachley Halt

General information
- Location: Tutshill, nr Chepstow, Forest of Dean; England
- Grid reference: ST544943
- Platforms: 2

Other information
- Status: Disused

History
- Post-grouping: Great Western Railway

Key dates
- 9 July 1934: Station opened
- 5 January 1959: Station closed
Location

Tutshill for Beachley Halt was a request stop on the South Wales Railway (now known as the Gloucester to Newport Line) and Wye Valley Railway. It was opened on 9 July 1934, and was intended to serve the nearby village of Tutshill. However, though the station was situated a short distance from the junction of the Wye Valley Railway and was still on the main line, the only trains which served the small halt were from the Wye Valley Railway and when the line closed on 5 January 1959, the stop closed with it.

The station was built nearby to the site of Chepstow East Station, temporarily opened between 1851 and 1852.

| Preceding station | Historical railways | Following station |
|---|---|---|
| Chepstow; Line and station open | British Railways; South Wales Railway | Woolaston; Line open, station closed |
| | Disused railways | |
| Chepstow; Line and station open | British Railways; Wye Valley Railway | Tidenham; Line and station closed |
