= Llandogo =

Coordinates: 51.7318°N 2.68715°W

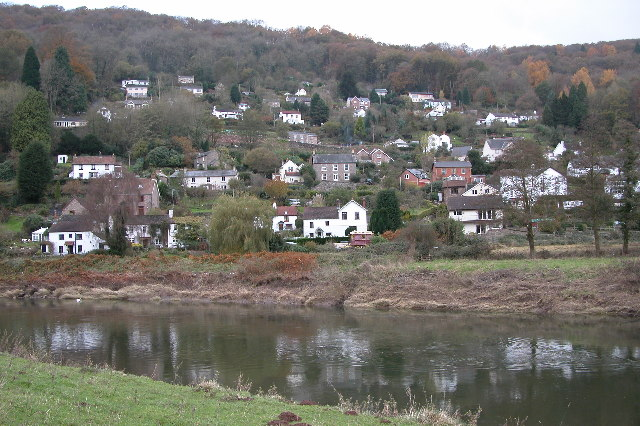
- Llandogo viewed from across the River Wye

- Location within Monmouthshire
- Population: 547
- OS grid reference: SO525039
- Community: Wye Valley
- Principal area: Monmouthshire
- Preserved county: Gwent
- Country: Wales
- Sovereign state: United Kingdom
- Post town: MONMOUTH
- Postcode district: NP25
- Dialling code: 01594
- Police: Gwent
- Fire: South Wales
- Ambulance: Welsh
- UK Parliament: Monmouth
- Senedd Cymru – Welsh Parliament: Monmouth

Llandogo is a small village in Monmouthshire, south Wales, between Monmouth and Chepstow in the lower reaches of the Wye Valley AONB, two miles north of Tintern. It is set on a steep hillside overlooking the River Wye and across into the Forest of Dean in Gloucestershire, England. The 2011 census population was 547.

== History ==
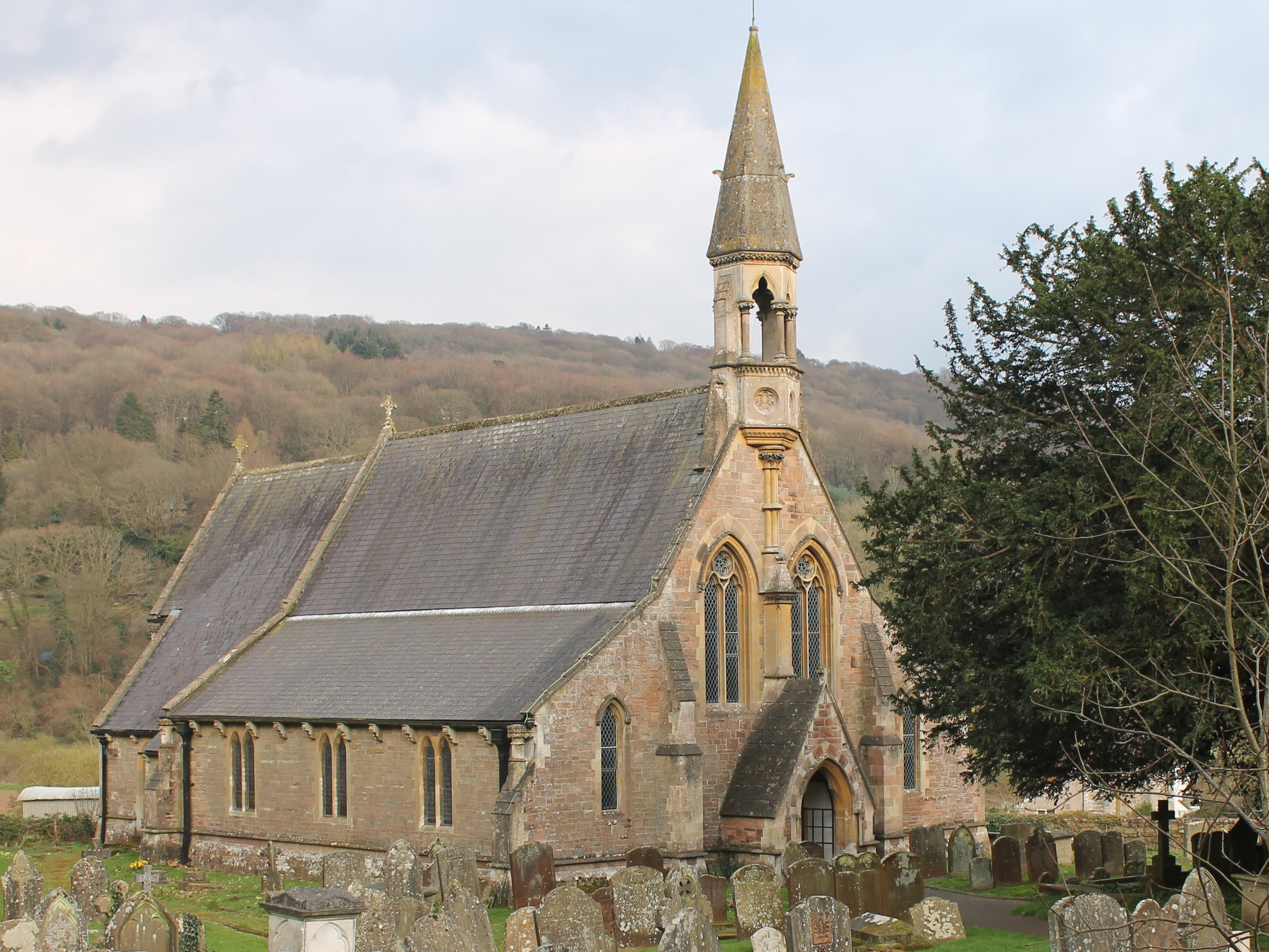
Church of St Oudoceus

The village derives its name from St Euddogwy (Oudoceus), the third Bishop of Llandaff, who is said to have lived in the area in the sixth or seventh century. Llaneuddogwy, the historic form of the name, is still occasionally used, although Llandogo is the standard form in both Welsh and English. The church was formerly also or alternatively dedicated to St Einion Frenin, who was credited with establishing St Cadfan's monastery on Bardsey Island off Llŷn. The present church is on the site of a 7th or 8th-century foundation, but was wholly rebuilt in 1859–1861 by John Pollard Seddon. It has been described as one of Seddon's "most high-spirited small churches", with "polychromatic interplay inside and out" between mauve and ochre stone, and "an extraordinarily elaborate belfry".

Llandogo was a port, renowned at one time for building of the trow, a flat-bottomed river boat that until the 19th century was used for trading up and down the River Wye, also on the River Severn shore and across the Severn Estuary and the Bristol Channel to Bristol. The boat gave its name to the historic Llandoger Trow pub close to the harbour in Bristol. The bell of The William and Sarah, one of the last Chepstow barges to trade on the river, can be found in the bell tower of the church at Llandogo.

The Priory is a villa built in 1838 for John Gough by the architects Wyatt & Brandon. It is associated with Robert Baden-Powell, founder of the Scouting movement, who spent several summers as a boy there. He recounts in the sixth yarn of Scouting For Boys an expedition by folding boat up the River Thames, down the River Avon and across the Severn Estuary, finishing in Llandogo. The house belonged to Count Henry Philip Ducarel de la Pasture, whose wife and daughter were both well-known novelists, as Mrs Henry de la Pasture and E. M. Delafield respectively.

== Areas of interest ==
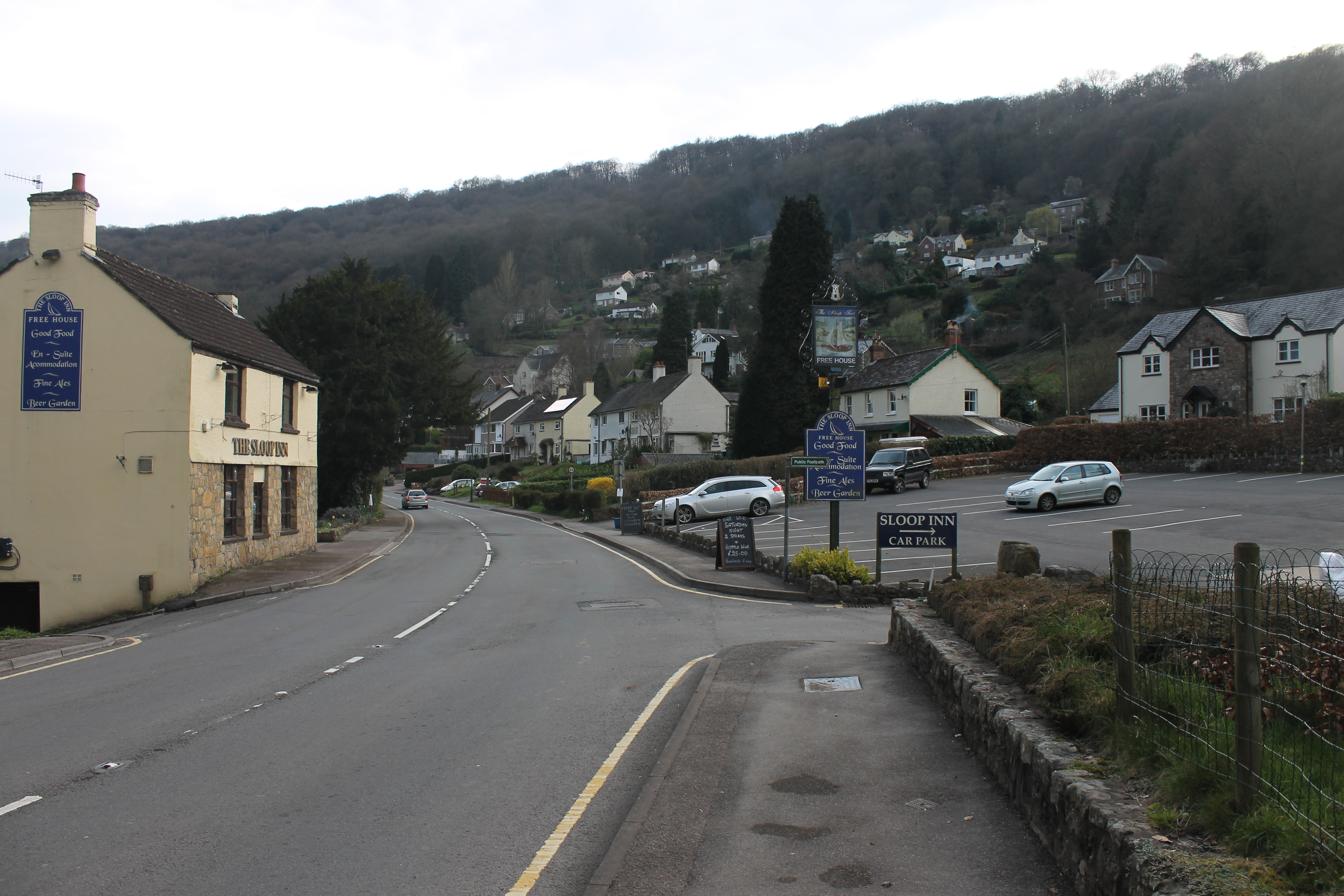
Llandogo with the Sloop Inn on the left.

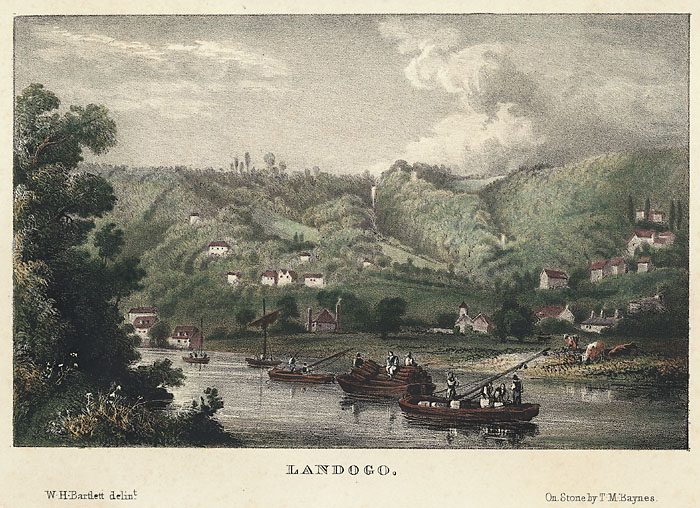
Coloured lithograph by William Henry Bartlett, c. 1845

There are many local walks along the river bank and up through the village to Cleddon Shoots, a local Site of Special Scientific Interest and towards the village of Trellech. The Wye Valley Walk runs along the top of the village, and the Offa's Dyke walk is just across the river. The village is designated as a Conservation Area.

The village hall, the Millennium Hall, was opened in 2003 by The Princess Royal. Events are organised by the local community.

Brown's Stores was the village's only general goods store since 1921 until it closed in 2021. The family itself have lived in the village for generations.

The Sloop Inn is the village's only public house and derives its name from the sloops that traded up and down the River Wye and across the Bristol Channel, being larger than the smaller, lighter flat bottomed trows.

=== Cleddon Shoots ===
Cleddon Shoots is an area of acidic woodland on the east facing slope of the valley above Llandogo. The main trees present are Sessile Oak, Beech, Ash and Alder.

=== Cleddon Falls ===
Cleddon Falls (SO520039) is a waterfall that rises above the southwest of the village and runs eastwards down into the Wye Valley.

== Railways ==
St Briavels railway station was a station along the Wye Valley Railway. It was built in 1876 during the construction of the line on the Monmouthshire side of the River Wye at Bigsweir, and was intended to serve the nearby villages of St Briavels, across the river in the Forest of Dean, and Llandogo, which is further down the Wye Valley. It was closed on 5 January 1959 when the line was closed to passenger services. St Briavels station was renamed three time during its life: firstly Bigsweir Station, then St Briavels and Llandogo Station, and finally St Briavels Station. Eventually a new halt was provided. Llandogo Halt railway station was a request stop on the former Wye Valley Railway. It was opened on 7 March 1927 to serve the village of Llandogo. It was closed in 1959 following the withdrawal of passenger services on the line. It was the smallest construction on the Wye Valley Railway.

== Cultural references ==
Llandogo was a main filming site for the 2019 TV series Sex Education.
