= Chepstow East railway station =

Former railway station in England

Coordinates: 51.6443°N 2.6653°W

Chepstow East

General information
- Location: Tutshill, nr Chepstow, Forest of Dean; England
- Grid reference: ST553948

Other information
- Status: Disused

History
- Original company: South Wales Railway

Key dates
- 19 September 1851: Station opened
- 19 July 1852: Station closed
Location

Chepstow East railway station was a temporary station on the South Wales Railway (now the Gloucester to Newport Line). It was on the opposite bank of the River Wye from Chepstow and was only used for a few months until the river was crossed by a railway bridge. This was about 1 mile (1.6 km) from Chepstow railway station, (Note: By road, across the Wye Bridge. There was no more direct route at this time.) at the road bridge close to the future junction of the Wye Valley line (which opened in November 1876). It was opened on 19 September 1851 and served as a temporary station while the Chepstow railway bridge was being constructed across the river to link up with the rest of the line. It closed on 19 July 1852, the day that the bridge over the Wye was opened.

Another station, Tutshill for Beachley Halt was opened in 1934 at a close location.

Preceding station	Historical railways	Following station
Terminus	South Wales Railway	Woolaston; Line open, station closed
