= Oudoceus =

Early medieval Welsh bishop and saint

Saint Oudoceus
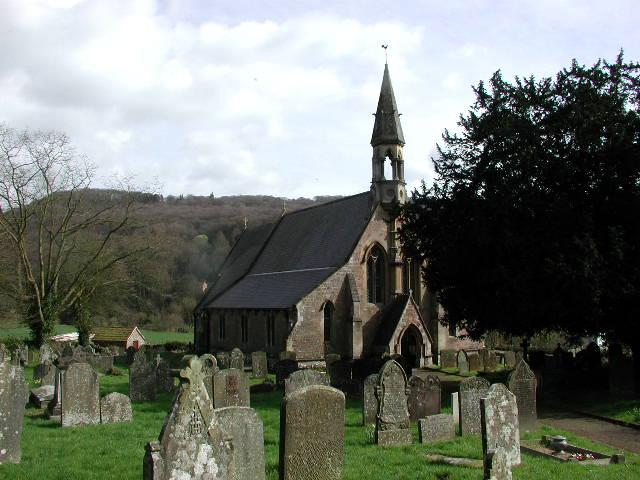
- Church of St Oudoceus, Llandogo
- Born: 6th Century
- Venerated in: Eastern Orthodox Church; Catholic Church
- Feast: 2 July

Saint Oudoceus (Latin) or Euddogwy (Welsh) (c.536–c.615 or 625) is generally known as the third Bishop of Llandaff in South Wales. In reality he was probably a 7th-century bishop at Llandeilo Fawr. Wendy Davies puts his episcopal reign between about 650 and 700.

== Life ==
Information regarding Oudeceus is largely derived from the 12th century Book of Llandaff, composed to enhance the prestige of the see of Llandaff as reorganised by the Normans. His supposed consecration by the Archbishop of Canterbury is the first mention in a written source of the diocese being subservient to Canterbury.

Land grants in the Book of Llandaff show Oudoceus as a contemporary of late 7th-century kings of South Wales. He was said to be the son of Buddig, a king of Brittany, and Anawfedd, the sister of Saint Teilo. His brothers were said to be the saints Ismael, Bishop of Rhos, and Tyfei, the martyr.

His associations with Llandaff are very strong and it seems he was an early patron of the church there, where he is said to have placed relics of Saint Teilo, one of his predecessors as bishop. In the Life of St. Oudoceus, Einion, King of Glywysing, is said to have been hunting a stag amongst the rocks and woods of the river Wye; when the stag reaching the cloak of Oudoceus lay down on it, the hounds were unable to touch it. Einion then made a gift of land to the saint. Einion, however, was the son of Morgan Hen ab Owain (died 974), thus not a contemporary.

The original church at Llandaff (perhaps a monastery) may well have been an early foundation. However, it is likely to have been founded by Saint Oudoceus rather than Saint Teilo. He eventually retired to Llandogo, near Tintern, and died there on 2 July, which is his feast day. He was supposedly buried at the church in Llandaff, on the site of the present Llandaff Cathedral, where there was a shrine to him until 1547. He is one of the three saints to whom the cathedral is dedicated.

== Hagiography ==
Oudoceus's 12th-century hagiographic 'life' in the Book of Llandaff tells how he was the son of King Budic of Brittany, born in that country shortly after his father's return there from exile in Dyfed. His mother, Anawed, was said to be the sister of Saint Teilo and Budic promised that Oudoceus could train for a life in the Church under him. So Oudoceus came to Wales and eventually succeeded Teilo as Bishop of Llandaff.

There is no evidence that Llandaff was the centre of a bishopric until at least the early 11th century, and it is now thought that Oudoceus could have been based at Llandeilo Fawr or at Llandogo, where he is said to have been a bishop in c.580. The "cult of Euddogwy" may thus have been a revival of the cult of an earlier saint which attempted to derive legitimacy from the connection with Llandaff.
