= Netherhope Halt railway station =

Former railway station in England

Netherhope Halt

General information
- Location: Tidenham, Forest of Dean; England
- Coordinates: 51.6635°N 2.6506°W
- Platforms: 1

Other information
- Status: Disused

History
- Original company: Great Western Railway
- Post-grouping: Great Western Railway

Key dates
- 16 May 1932: Opened
- 5 January 1959: Closed
Location

Netherhope Halt was a railway station on the former Wye Valley Railway. It was opened in 1932 and closed in 1959; it was demolished soon afterwards.

Preceding station	Disused railways	Following station
Tidenham	Wye Valley Railway; British Railways	Tintern
