= Brockweir Halt railway station =

Disused railway station in Wales

Coordinates: 51.70700°N 2.66990°W

Brockweir Halt

General information
- Location: Brockweir, Monmouthshire; Wales
- Platforms: 1

Other information
- Status: Disused

History
- Post-grouping: Great Western Railway

Key dates
- 19 August 1929: Opened
- January 1959: Closed
Location

Brockweir Halt was a request stop on the former Wye Valley Railway. It was opened to the public on 19 August 1929. It closed in 1959 when passenger services were withdrawn from the line. It was situated just north of Brockweir bridge. Nothing now remains of the trackbed because of the realignment of the A466.

Preceding station	Disused railways	Following station
Tintern	Wye Valley Railway; British Railways	Llandogo Halt
