= Tintern Quarry =

Disused quarry in Gloucestershire

Coordinates: 51.6794°N 2.6581°W

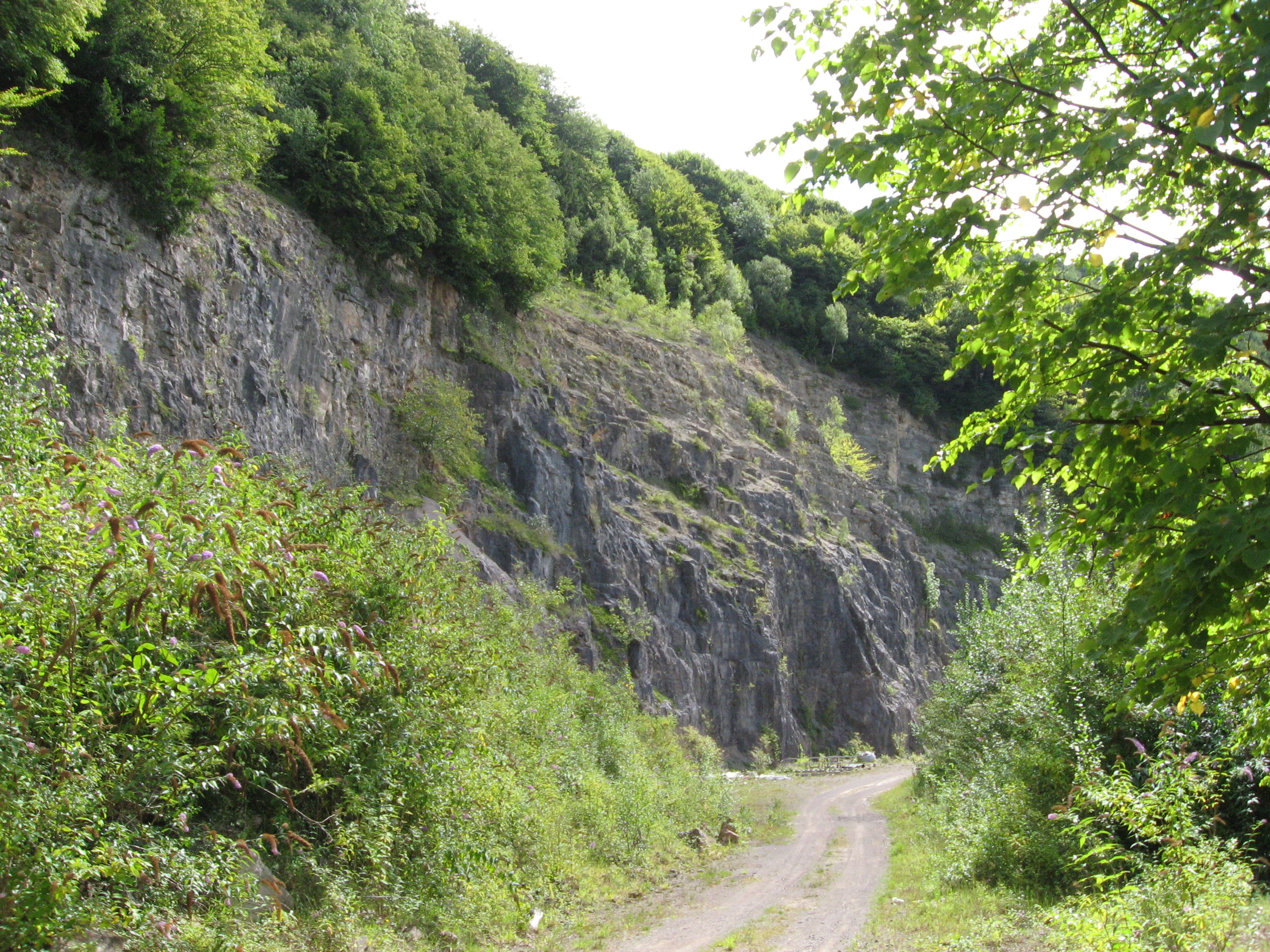
Part of Tintern Quarry

Tintern Quarry was a quarry in the Forest of Dean, Gloucestershire, England. It was served by the Wye Valley Railway from 1876 until it closed in 1981. The quarry was on the opposite side of the River Wye from the village of Tintern.

It is now used, unofficially, as a rock-climbing venue with many climbs on the more solid rock on its many terraces. A Climbers Club Guide, Lower Wye Valley, describes the climbing at the quarry.
