= Llandogo Halt railway station =

Former railway station in Wales

Coordinates: 51.7326°N 2.6868°W

Llandogo Halt

General information
- Location: Llandogo, Monmouthshire; Wales
- Platforms: 1

Other information
- Status: Disused

History
- Post-grouping: Great Western Railway

Key dates
- March 1927: Opened
- January 1959: Closed
Location

Llandogo Halt was a request stop on the former Wye Valley Railway. It was opened on 9 March 1927 to serve the village of Llandogo. It was closed in 1959 following the withdrawal of passenger services on the line. It was the smallest construction on the Wye Valley Railway.

Preceding station	Disused railways	Following station
Brockweir Halt	Wye Valley Railway; British Railways	St Briavels
