= Church of St Oudoceus, Llandogo =

- Church of St Oudoceus
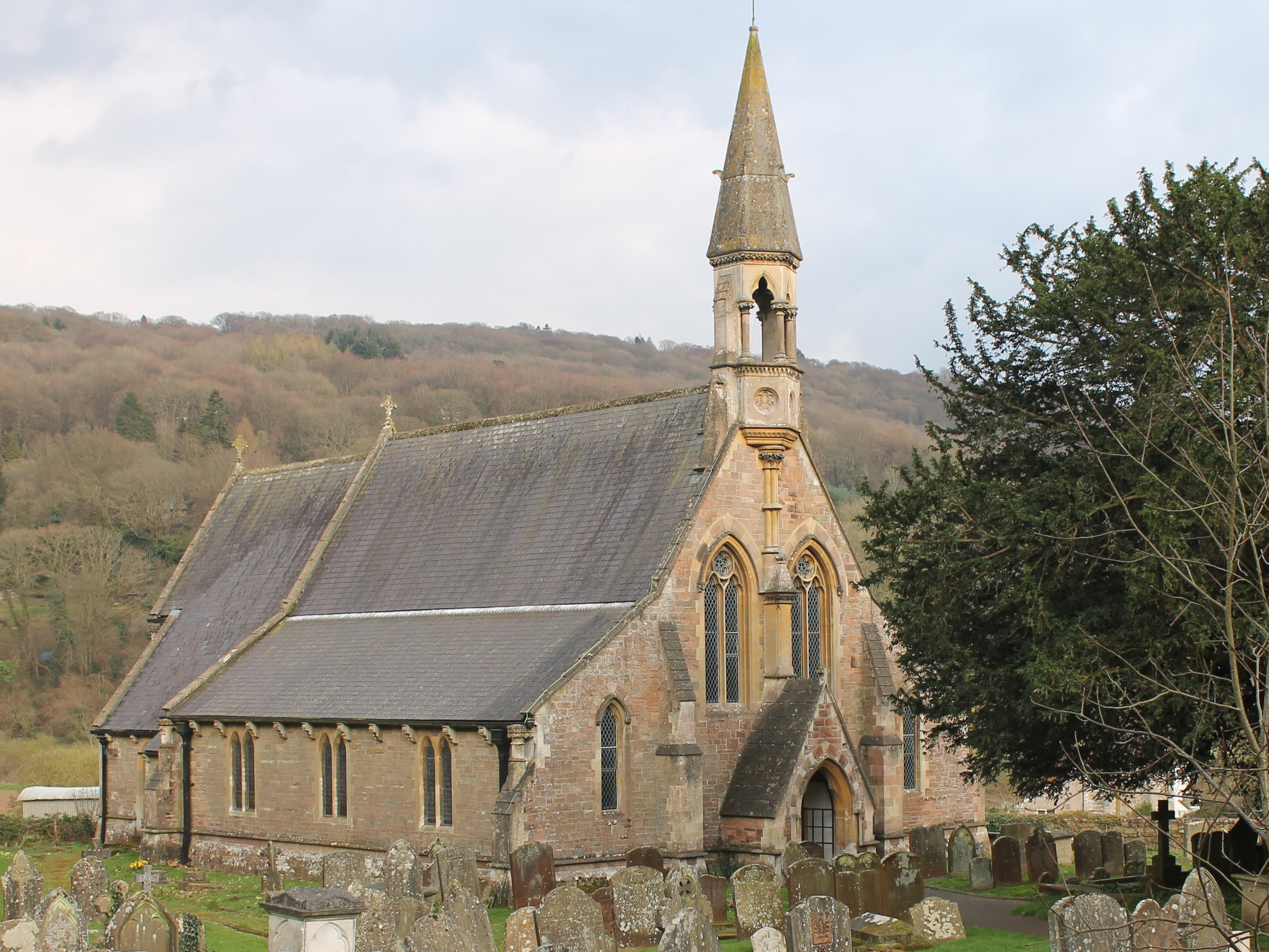
- "an elaborate belfry, a sort of pulpit in the sky"

- Location in Monmouthshire
- 51.7334°N 2.6867°W
- Location: Llandogo, Monmouthshire
- Country: Wales
- Denomination: Church in Wales

History
- Status: parish church
- Founded: 1859
- Dedicated: 1861

Architecture
- Functional status: Active
- Heritage designation: Grade II*
- Designated: 18 July 1997
- Architect: John Pollard Seddon
- Architectural type: Church
- Style: Gothic revival

Administration
- Diocese: Monmouth
- Archdeaconry: Monmouth
- Deanery: Monmouth
- Parish: Llandogo with Whitebrook Chapel and Tintern Parva

Clergy
- Priest: The Reverend R A Dagger

The Church of St Oudoceus, Llandogo, Monmouthshire is a parish church built in 1859–1861. The church is dedicated to St Oudoceus (Euddogwy), an early Bishop of Llandaff who retired to Llandogo and was reputed to have died there in about AD 700. Designed by the ecclesiastical architect John Pollard Seddon, the church has a notable painted interior. It is an active parish church and a Grade II* listed building.

== History ==
The site is monastic in origin and is first mentioned as a religious foundation in 625. Oudoceus is recorded as having retired here and a subsequent church was constructed in the Middle Ages. Nothing now remains of the earlier church. The present building was designed by John Pollard Seddon and was built between 1859 and 1861. Further construction, including decoration of the interior, was undertaken in 1869. The church remains an active parish church.

== Architecture and description ==
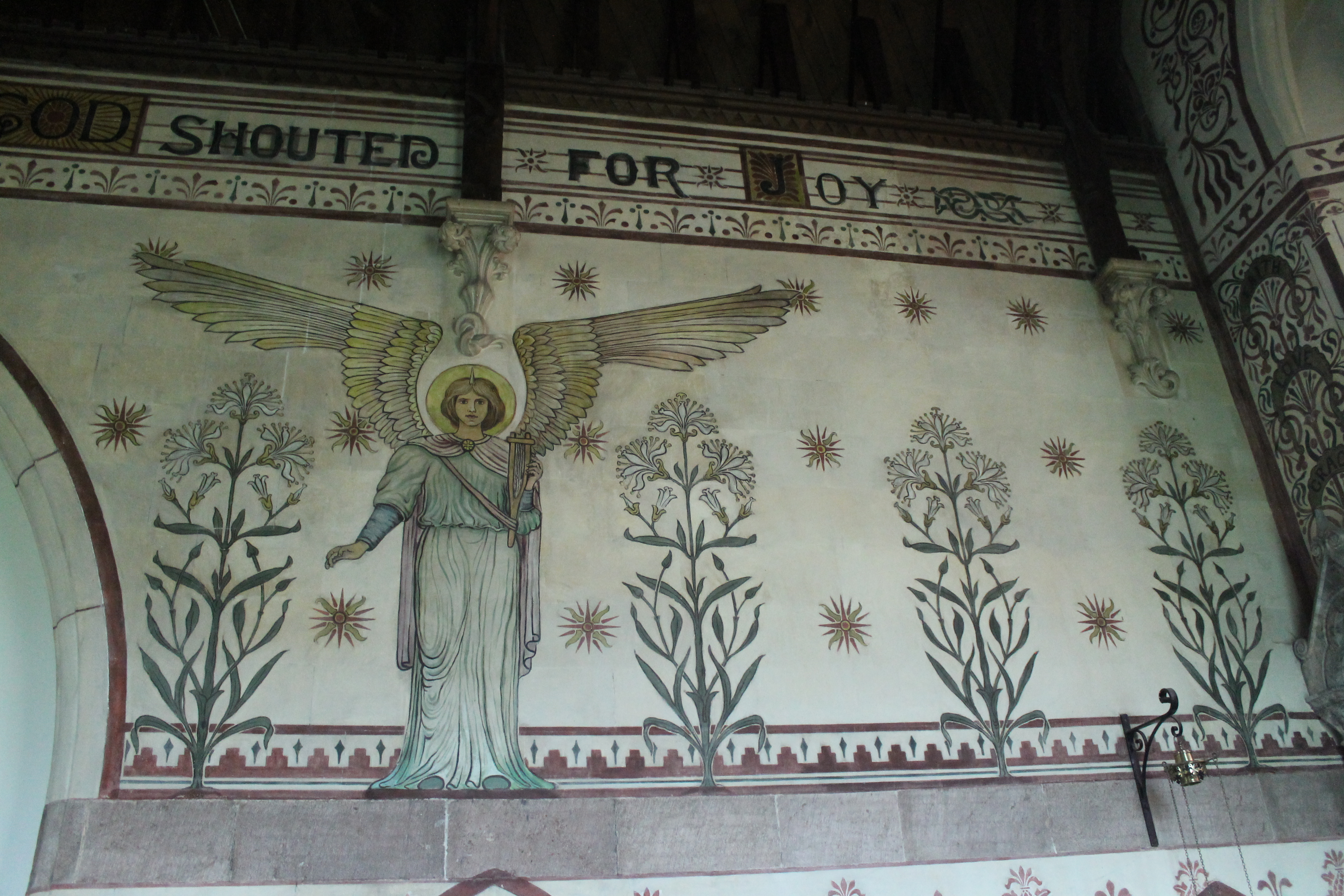
Chancel decoration of "angels and rows of lillies"

The church is constructed of Old Red Sandstone with Bath Stone dressings, creating a polychromatic display. It has a nave, roofed in Welsh slate, a chancel with vestry, two porches and a bellcote. The architectural historian John Newman describes this as "an extraordinarily elaborate belfry, a sort of pulpit in the sky". The style of the whole is Early French.

The interior is "calmer" but still elaborate, decorated with wall paintings by a German artist to the designs of Coates Carter, Seddon's architectural partner after John Prichard's death.
