= Chepstow railway station =

Historic railway station in Monmouthshire, Wales

Chepstow Welsh: Cas-gwent
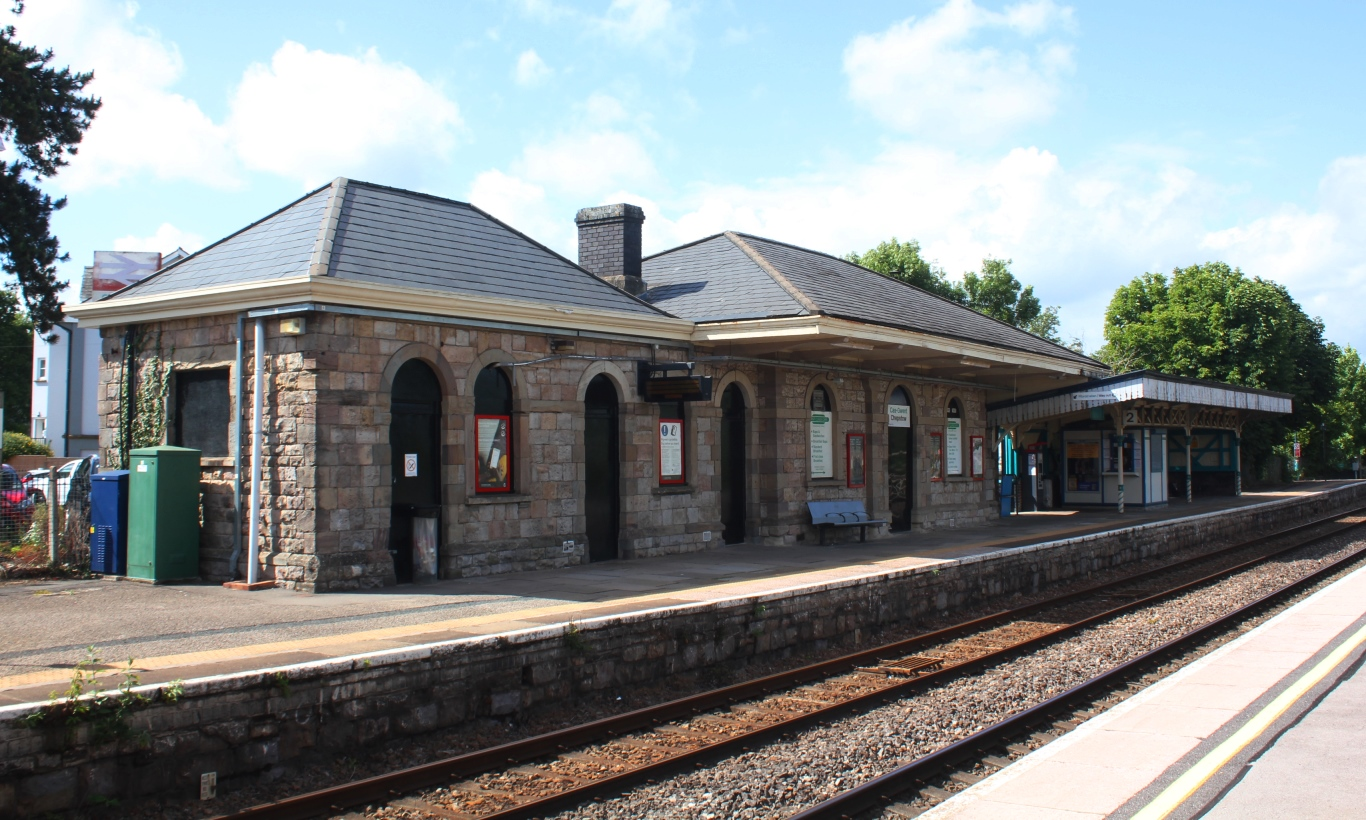
- Chepstow station in June 2022

General information
- Location: Chepstow, Monmouthshire; Wales
- Coordinates: 51°38′24″N 2°40′16″W
- Grid reference: ST536936
- Managed by: Transport for Wales
- Platforms: 2

Other information
- Station code: CPW
- Classification: DfT category F1

Passengers
- 2020/21: ▼35,062
- 2021/22: ▲0.147 million
- 2022/23: ▲0.179 million
- 2023/24: ▲0.211 million
- 2024/25: ▲0.239 million

Listed Building – Grade II
- Feature: Chepstow Railway Station
- Designated: 26 November 1974
- Reference no.: 2586
Location
Notes
- Passenger statistics from the Office of Rail and Road

Chepstow railway station is a part of the British railway system owned by Network Rail and is operated by Transport for Wales. Chepstow station is on the Gloucester to Newport Line, 141 miles 33 chains (227.6 km) from the zero point at Paddington, measured via Stroud. It is 330 yards (300 m) from the town centre, at Station Road. Chepstow is a historic walled border town and ancient port, situated at the southern end of the Wye Valley, two hours from London.

The line continues east from the station to Gloucester over the Chepstow railway bridge. It was formerly the junction station for the Wye Valley Railway to Monmouth Troy station until this line closed to passengers in 1959. The railway now consists of a double track line with a trailing crossover to the east of the station, plus some disused track in the former yard.

== Description ==
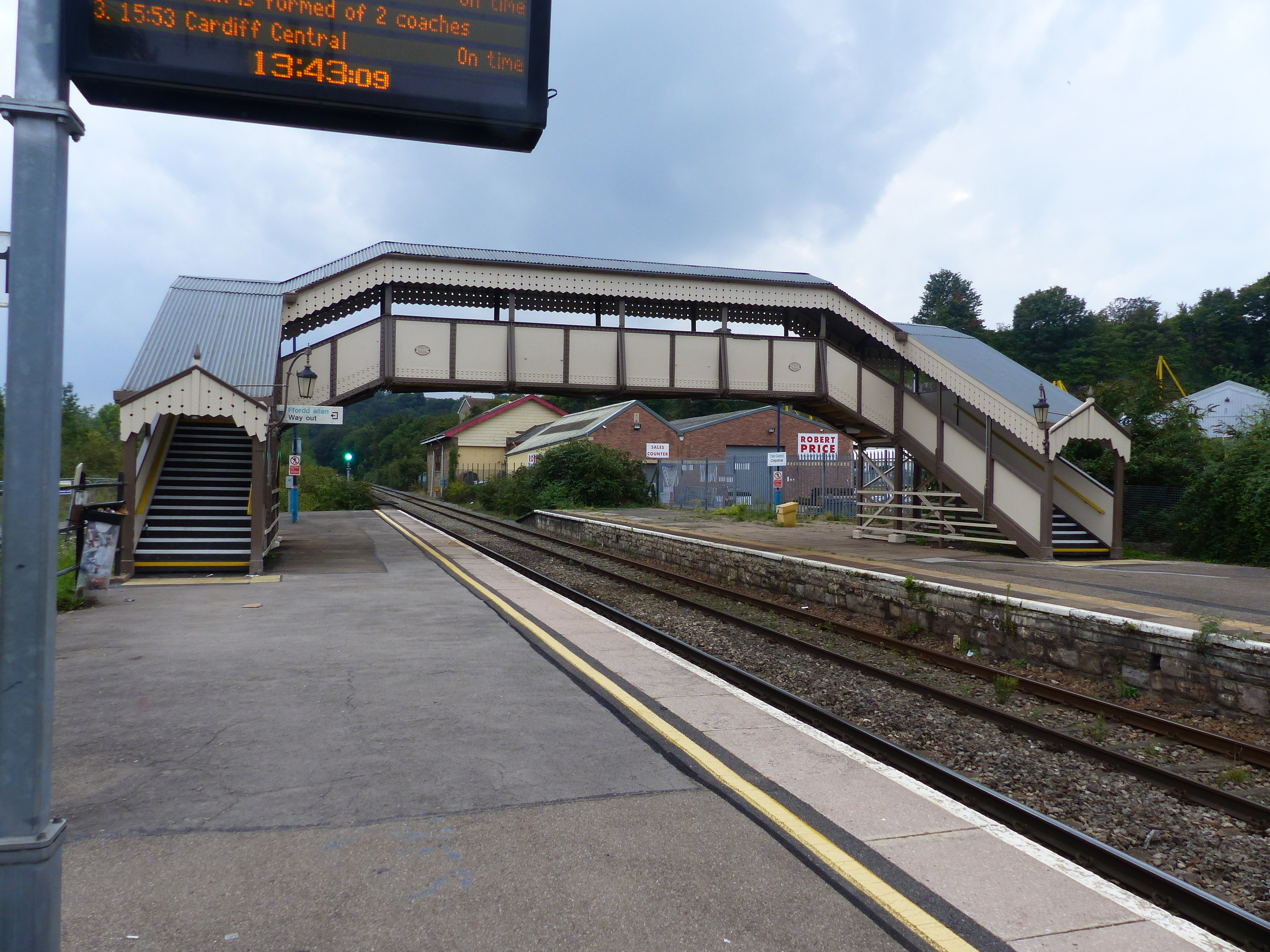
The restored cast-iron footbridge (2021)

The single-storey buildings on the Gloucester/Birmingham side of the line are stone and timber-built structures, in an Italianate style. They were completed in 1850 for Isambard Kingdom Brunel's South Wales Railway, and according to architectural historian John Newman were designed by N. Lancaster Owen. A canopy provides shelter. On the more popular Newport/Cardiff side, there is just a small modern shelter.

Access to this platform is via a cast-iron footbridge, making it difficult for passengers with pushchairs and the old and the infirm to cross. The footbridge is a now-rare survival of a typical GWR iron pattern, still with its wooden cladding and canopy, and is Grade II listed. It was cast in Edward Finch's ironworks, adjoining the station. In January 2021, the footbridge was removed for extensive repairs and is due to be reinstalled during the Spring. A temporary footbridge was installed prior to its removal.

Other Grade II listings at the station include the two bridges: the surviving piers and abutment of the Chepstow Railway Bridge, and the bridge providing access to the steam mill and ironworks site.

== Services ==
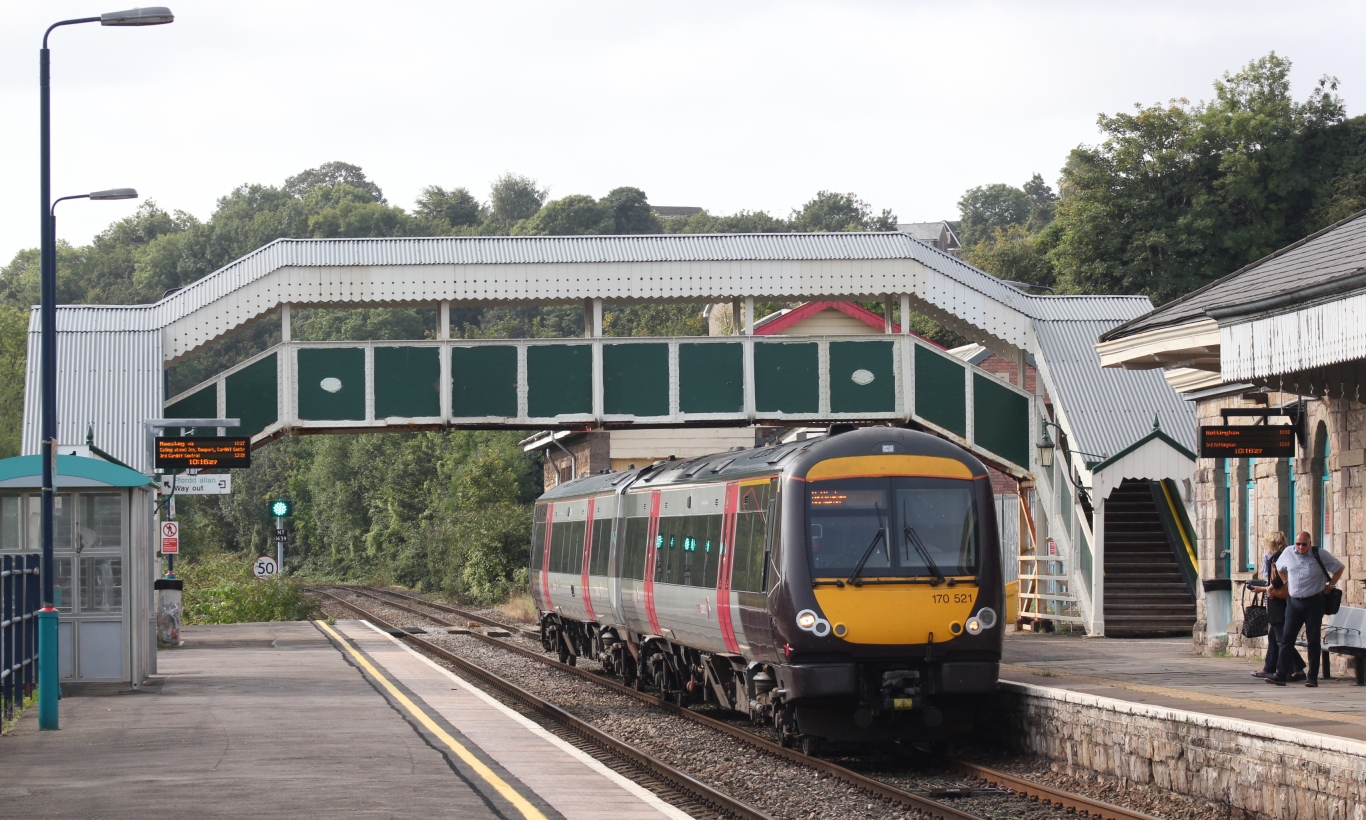
A CrossCountry service from Cardiff to Nottingham

The local rail service is sporadic, running an hourly service in each direction. A local campaign has been established, with the support of the local MP, Welsh Assembly members, County Council and town council, to improve rail services to the town. In May 2011, CrossCountry commenced a year-long trial of stopping its Cardiff-Birmingham-Nottingham services at the station on weekdays and Saturdays. In December 2011, it was reported that the trial would be extended until at least December 2012.

As of May 2016, the service pattern consists of the hourly (with occasional two-hour gaps) Cheltenham Spa - Cardiff Central - Maesteg service (serving all intermediate stations between Gloucester & Newport) plus calls every second hour by the CrossCountry Nottingham - Cardiff Central trains. On Sundays, there is a two-hourly service in each direction (no CrossCountry services).

Preceding station	National Rail	Following station
Caldicot	Transport for Wales; Maesteg / Cardiff Central - Cheltenham Spa	Lydney
Caldicot or Newport	CrossCountry; Cardiff Central - Birmingham New Street / Nottingham (Mondays to Saturdays only)	Lydney
	Historical railways	
Portskewett	Wye Valley Railway; British Railways	Chepstow East (Across the River Wye by road)

== Facilities ==
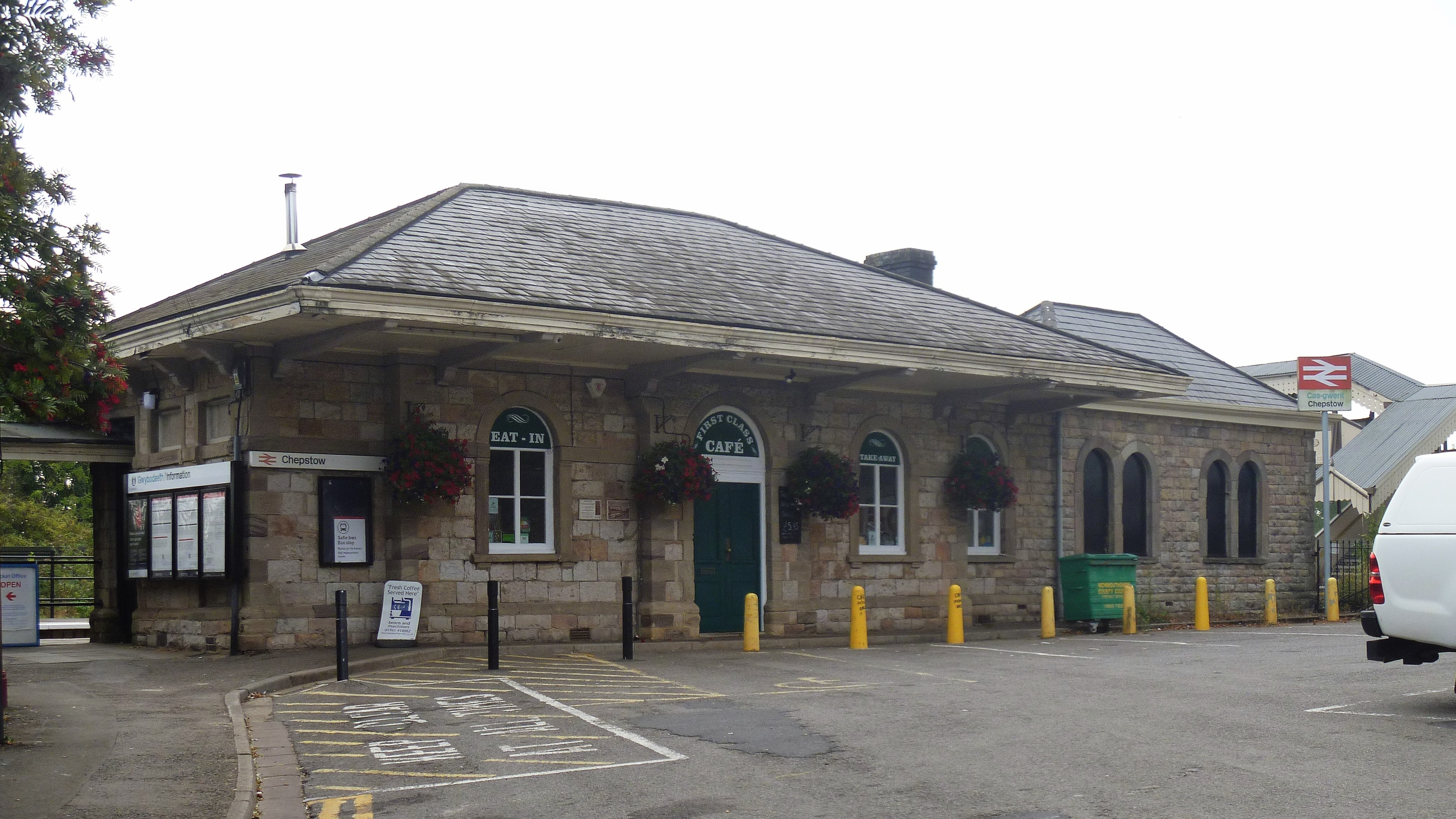
Station building which now houses a cafe

The station is staffed, and a cafe offering light refreshments is available in the main building. The ticket office is run by a third-party operator, Chepstow Trains, on behalf of Network Rail and Transport for Wales, and is open part-time, six days per week (closed from late afternoon and all day Sundays). A self-service ticket machine is provided for use and for collecting pre-paid tickets. Train running information is offered via digital CIS displays and timetable poster boards.

The nearest bus stop is a 5-minute walk away in the Tesco car park; however the service is infrequent and consists of just a local service. Chepstow bus station is about 550 yards (0.5 km) further; from here buses to a wider area may be found. On race days, special buses are normally laid on to convey racegoers to and from Chepstow Racecourse; this is a walk of approximately half an hour's duration.

Limited station parking is available, with eleven spaces. There is a car park near the station with more spaces.

== See also ==
- Chepstow East railway station
