= St Briavels railway station =

Former railway station in Wales

Coordinates: 51.7417°N 2.6717°W

St Briavels
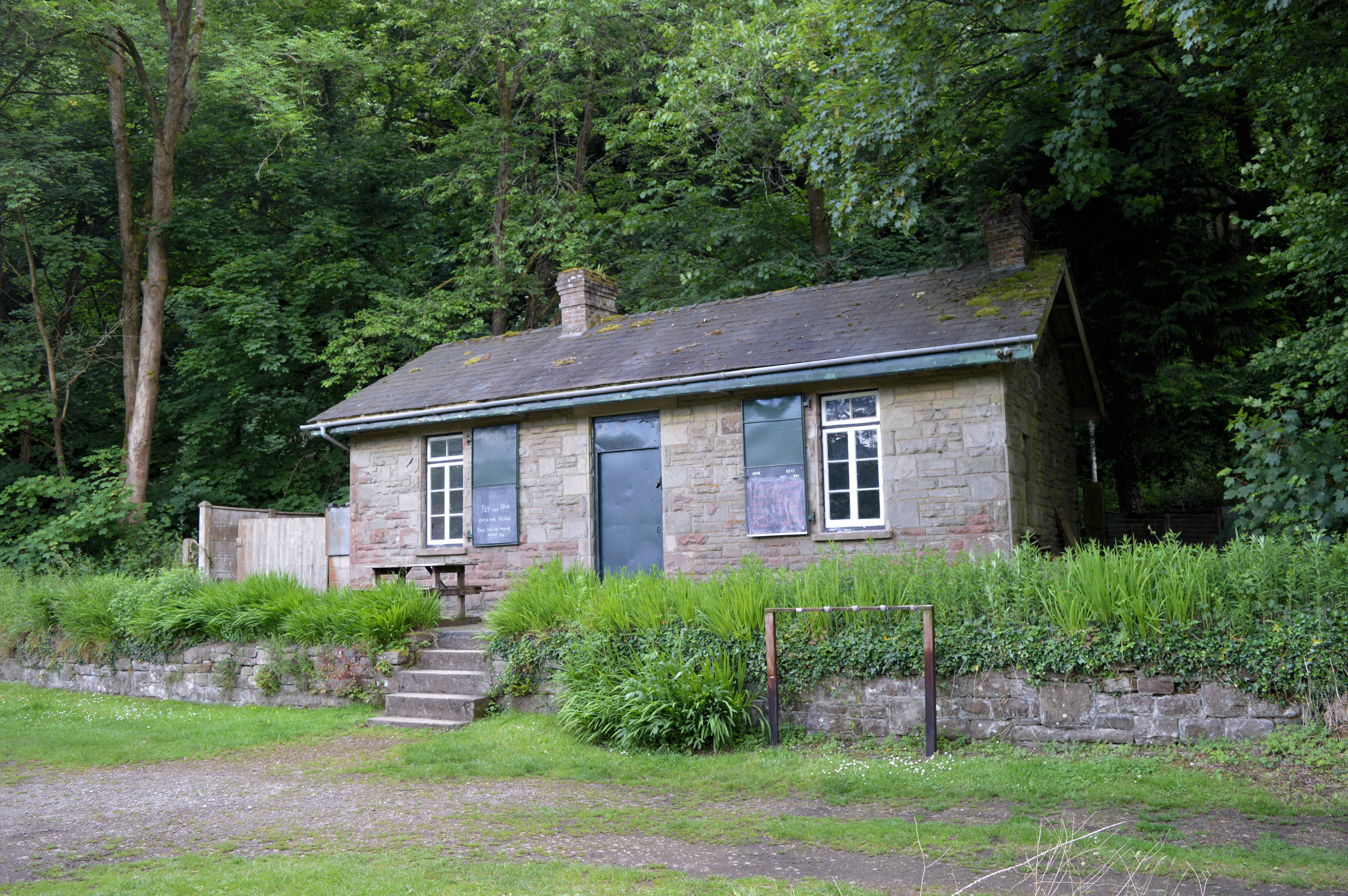
- The site of the station in 2017

General information
- Location: Trellech, Monmouthshire; Wales
- Grid reference: SO537049
- Platforms: 1

Other information
- Status: Disused

History
- Original company: Wye Valley Railway
- Pre-grouping: Great Western Railway
- Post-grouping: Great Western Railway

Key dates
- 1 November 1876: Station opened as Bigsweir
- 1 May 1909: Renamed St Briavels and Llandogo
- 9 March 1927: Renamed St Briavels
- 5 January 1959: Station closed
Location

St Briavels Station was a station along the Wye Valley Railway. It was built in 1876 during the construction of the line on the Monmouthshire side of the River Wye at Bigsweir, and was intended to serve the nearby villages of St Briavels, across the river in the Forest of Dean, and Llandogo, which is further down the Wye Valley. It was closed on 5 January 1959 when the line was closed to passenger services.

== History ==
The station was opened on 1 November 1876 as Bigsweir Station. It was renamed St Briavels and Llandogo in 1909, shortly after the line's amalgamation with the Great Western Railway. It was finally renamed St Briavels Station in 1927 with the opening of Llandogo Halt. The station consisted of a station building, goods shed, signal box, storage shed, sidings, crane and the only level crossing on the Wye Valley line, for the A466 road. The station was closed to passenger and freight services in January 1959. Following closure, the level crossing gates and signal box were removed. The station building and goods shed remain mostly on site. The goods shed, now minus its roof, is now the last surviving shed on the whole line.

Preceding station	Disused railways	Following station
Llandogo Halt	British Railways; Wye Valley Railway	Whitebrook Halt
