= Penallt Halt railway station =

Disused railway station on the Wye Valley Railway

Coordinates: 51.7844°N 2.6739°W

Penallt Halt
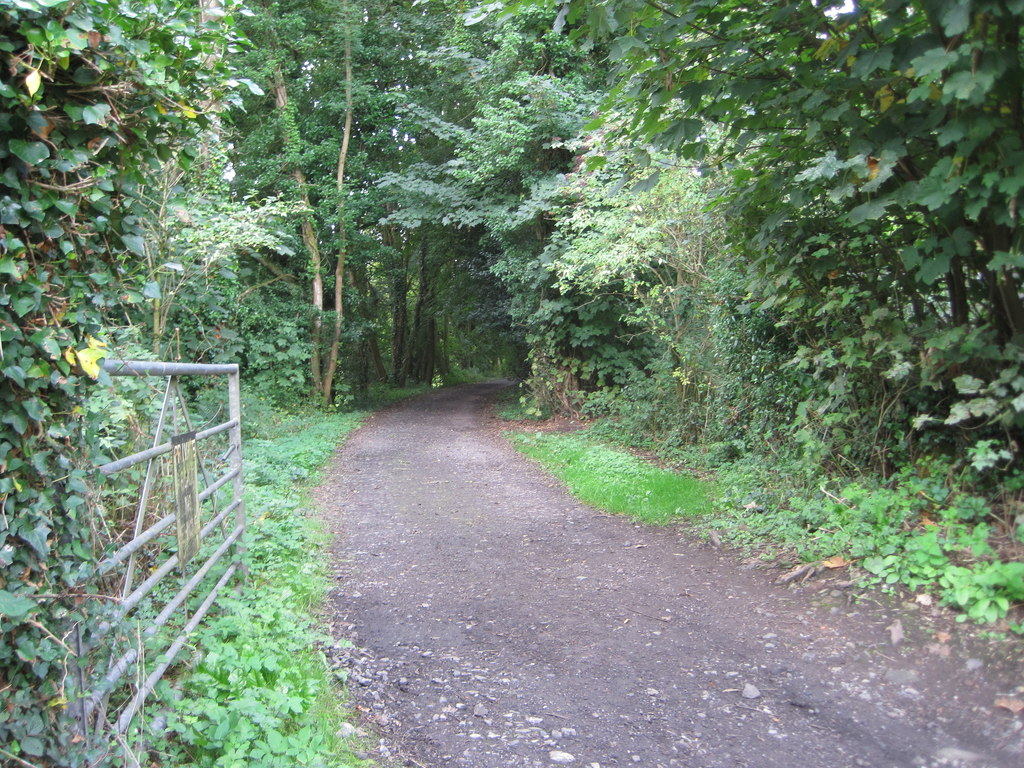
- The site of the station in 2013

General information
- Location: Penallt, Monmouthshire; Wales
- Platforms: 1

Other information
- Status: Disused

History
- Post-grouping: Great Western Railway

Key dates
- August 1931: Opened
- 1 January 1959: Closed
Location

Penallt Halt was a request stop on the former Wye Valley Railway. It was opened on 1 August 1931 and closed in 1959. Penallt Halt and Redbrook Station were the closest stations on the line with only Penallt Viaduct separating them. Penallt Halt was close to the village of Redbrook.

Preceding station	Disused railways	Following station
Whitebrook Halt	Wye Valley Railway; British Railways	Redbrook on Wye
