= Whitebrook Halt railway station =

Former railway station in Wales

Coordinates: 51.7577°N 2.6702°W

Whitebrook Halt

General information
- Location: Whitebrook, Monmouthshire; Wales
- Platforms: 1

Other information
- Status: Disused

History
- Post-grouping: Great Western Railway

Key dates
- February 1927: Opened
- January 1959: Closed
Location

Whitebrook Halt was a request stop on the former Wye Valley Railway. It was opened in 1927 to serve the village of Whitebrook. It was closed in 1959 when passenger services were withdrawn from the Wye Valley Railway.

Preceding station	Disused railways	Following station
St Briavels	Wye Valley Railway; British Railways	Penallt Halt
