= Tintern railway station =

Former railway station in Wales

Coordinates: 51.7029°N 2.6711°W

Tintern Station
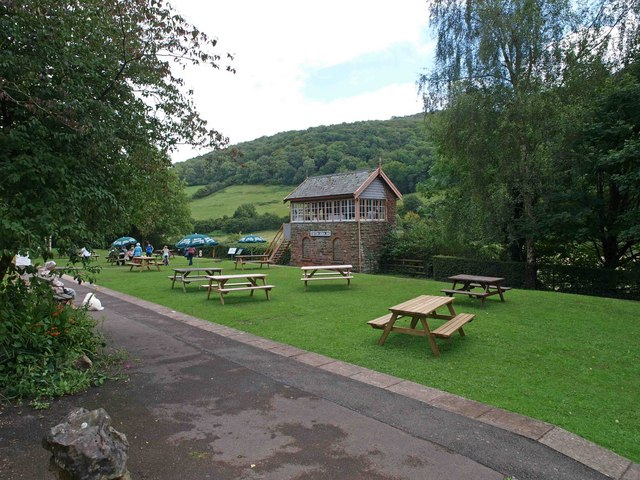
- A view of the restored station and signal box.

General information
- Location: Tintern, Monmouthshire; Wales
- Platforms: 3

Other information
- Status: Disused

History
- Original company: Wye Valley Railway.
- Pre-grouping: Great Western Railway

Key dates
- November 1876: Station opened
- 1912: Station renamed 'for Brockweir'
- January 1959: Station closed to passengers
- January 1964: Station closed completely
Location

Tintern railway station served the village of Tintern on the Wye Valley Railway. It was opened in 1876 and closed for passengers in 1959 and freight in 1964, when the line was closed completely. It was the second largest station on the line, the most substantial being Monmouth Troy railway station.

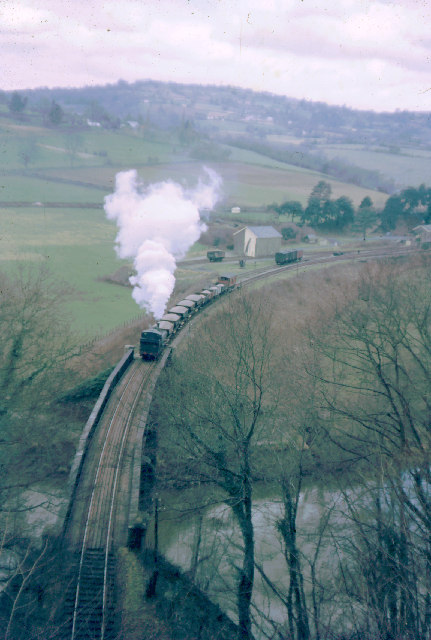
A Stone train in 1963 hauled by a steam locomotive departing southwards from the station.

== History ==
The station was opened on 1 November 1876 and was one of the four original stations along the line. It consisted of a signal box, sidings, goods shed, station building, three platforms (two of which were island platforms), and a section of double track to allow trains to pass each other. It was a large station because the railway company hoped to generate much income from tourist traffic visiting the famous Tintern Abbey.

The station was host to a GWR camp coach from 1935 to 1939. A camping coach was also positioned here by the Western Region from 1956 to 1962.

== Today ==
The Old Station Tintern was bought by the local county council for £1,500. It was then refurbished and opened as a visitor attraction. There is a cafe and exhibition on site as well as a movie about the railway in one of the old carriages moved to the station.

Monmouthshire County Council replaced the old railway carriages with two refurbished carriages in Spring 2010. The carriages provide a new shop, tourism information and the Destination Wye Valley exhibition as part of the £2.8m Heritage Lottery funded "Overlooking the Wye" scheme which is conserving various sites in the lower Wye Valley.

Preceding station	Disused railways	Following station
Netherhope Halt	British Railways; Wye Valley Railway	Brockweir Halt
