= Wye Valley =

River valley in England and Wales

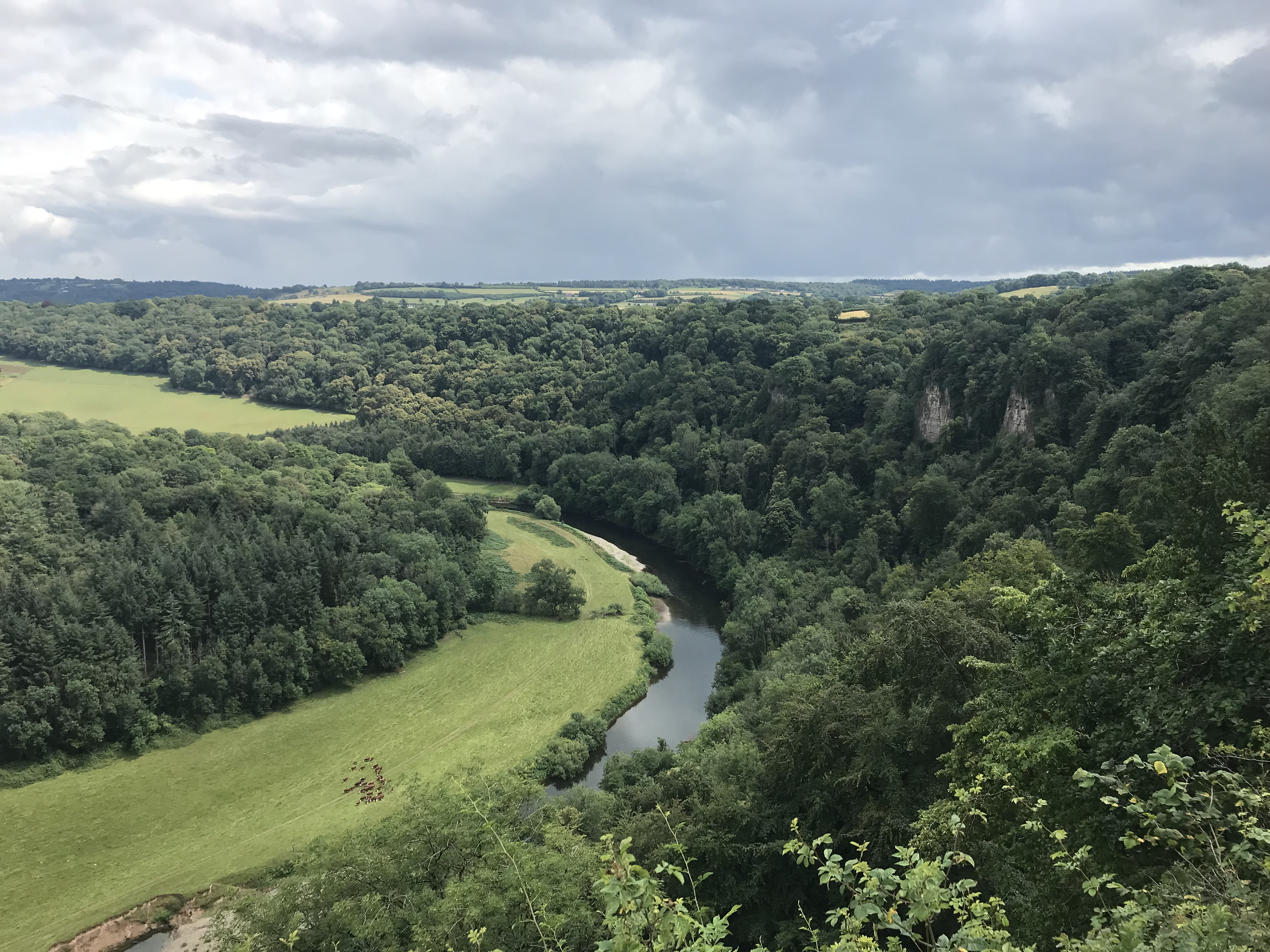
The River Wye viewed from Yat Rock

Wye Valley AONB locator map

The Wye Valley (Welsh: Dyffryn Gwy) is a valley in Wales and England. The River Wye (Welsh: Afon Gwy) is the fourth-longest river in the United Kingdom.

The upper part of the valley is in the Cambrian Mountains and is enclosed by hills as it descends through Rhayader, Builth Wells and Hay-on-Wye before reaching the England-Wales border and becoming a broader vale through Hereford. The lower part of the valley meanders past Ross-on-Wye and Monmouth, where it becomes the England-Wales border, before reaching the Severn Estuary at Chepstow. Much of this section features limestone gorge scenery and dense native woodlands, which made the Wye Valley historically important as one of the birthplaces of the modern tourism industry.

The lower part of the valley is designated as the Wye Valley National Landscape, an Area of Outstanding Natural Beauty, protected as an internationally important landscape. This designation covers 326 square kilometres (126 mi^{2}) surrounding a 72-kilometre (45 mi) stretch of the river, from just south of Hereford to Chepstow in the counties of Gloucestershire, Herefordshire and Monmouthshire. In addition to its landscape value, the area is recognised for its wildlife and archaeological and industrial remains.

== Geology ==
The varied landscapes of the Wye Valley can be explained by underlying rocks and structures, and how ice and then the river and tributary streams have acted upon them through time.

Close to Hereford, the geology of the area around the village of Woolhope is largely made up of Silurian limestones, shales and sandstones. To the south of this, the Herefordshire lowlands are largely underlain by red mudstones and sandstones, producing a redder soil. These rocks are softer than the limestones elsewhere, so the river created more meanders, a wider floodplain, and a gentler and more rolling landscape. Around Symonds Yat, limestones and red sandstones meet. This leads to a landscape of hills and plains, as well as substantial meanders which have formed impressive river cliffs.

The Lower Wye landscape was formed by the river acting on a series of layers of rock that dip towards the Forest of Dean. Here the river has incised into the margins of the Old Red Sandstone plateau to form a gorge with substantial river cliffs. The steepest parts of the Wye gorge are cut through the Carboniferous Limestone. Here the combined action of the river, natural joints in the rocks and quarrying have exposed many vertical faces, particularly between Tintern and Chepstow.

Geological interest extends underground, and there are many rock shelters and solution caves in the area. These include King Arthur's Cave and many others in the area of Symonds Yat and Slaughter Stream Cave near Berry Hill. At St Arvans, near Chepstow, the underground watercourses have carved out long cave systems, which exit at Otter Hole at the base of Piercefield cliffs – the only cave system in England or Wales which can only be reached through a tidal sump, making it a mecca for experienced cavers.

== Ecology ==
Lancaut and Ban-y-Gor are Gloucestershire Wildlife Trust nature reserves. They both have SSSI status being part of the nationally important Lower Wye Gorge SSSI and within the Wye Valley National Landscape. The Wye Valley is important for its rich wildlife habitats including ancient gorge woodland, saltmarsh and limestone cliffs.

The area has three sites of international importance, designated as Special Areas of Conservation (SACs) under the European Union's Habitats Directive. These are the River Wye (Afon Gwy), the Wye Valley and Forest of Dean Bat Sites (Safleoedd Ystlumod Dyffryn Gwy a Fforest y Ddena) and the Wye Valley Woodlands (Coetiroedd Dyffryn Gwy). It supports a population of lesser horseshoe bats, a growing population of peregrine falcons, goshawks, ravens, rare whitebeam, nightjar and lesser known fish like the shad and twaite. The main Welsh populations of the small but colourful moth Oecophora bractella are found here.

In September 2006 it was reported that one colony of lesser horseshoe bats in the area had reached record numbers, with some 890 bats in a small stone barn (599 adults and 291 pups).

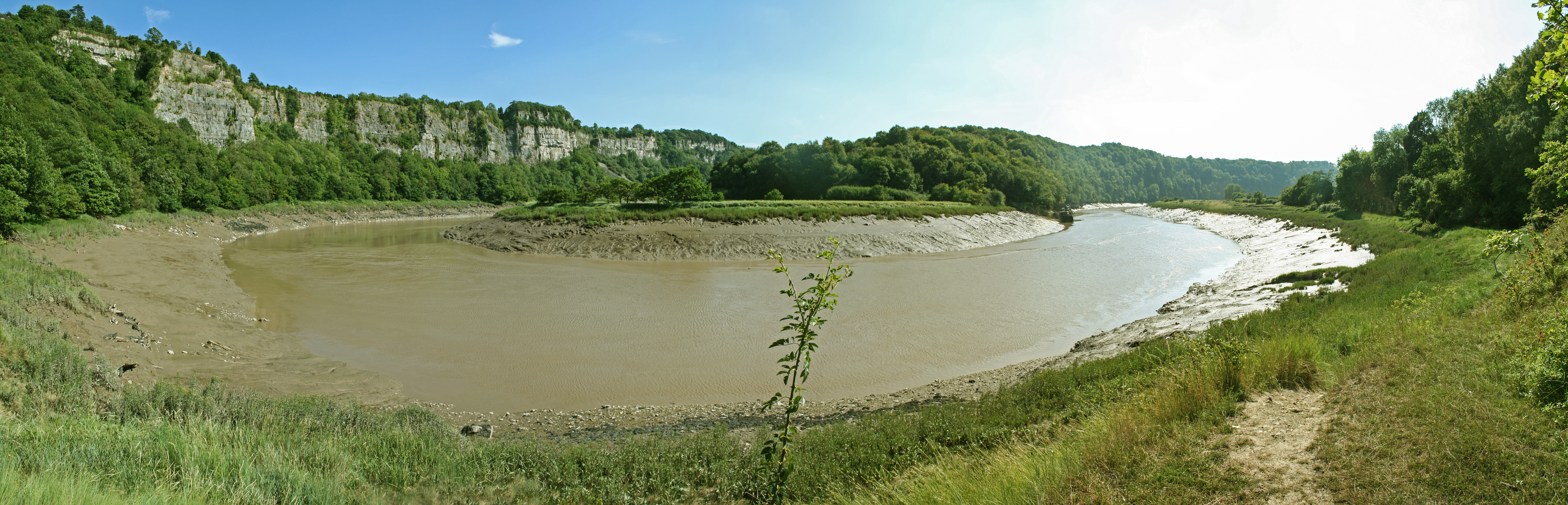
River Wye at Lancaut looking towards Wintour's Leap

== Archaeology ==
The valley has been inhabited for at least 12,000 years. Caves near Symonds Yat and Chepstow provide evidence of settlement dating from Palaeolithic times, and finds from later Stone Ages such as the Neolithic have also been found. These have yielded evidence of how prehistoric human populations lived as nomadic hunters and traders.

Standing stones at Huntsham, Staunton, and Trellech all have origins dating back to the Bronze Age. Later, Iron Age forts along the lower Wye Valley, and in the Woolhope area, took advantage of the natural hilltops and promontories to form well-defended settlements. It is likely that many of these marked the edges of disputed tribal pre-Roman territories.

Watling Street ran through the Roman settlements of Ariconium (just north of modern Ross-on-Wye) and Blestium (Monmouth), and a number of other small Roman settlements are known. The first evidence of the exploitation of iron and coal in the valley is found in the Roman period, with iron working known from sites at Monmouth, Trellech and elsewhere, as well as in the adjoining Forest of Dean. The medieval boroughs of Goodrich and Chepstow, at each end of the Wye Gorge, may have originally been established at this time.

Closely following the River Wye, Offa's Dyke was built in the 8th century under King Offa to mark out the boundary between England and Wales and is, today, the longest archaeological monument in Britain. Offa's Dyke Path long distance footpath today traces the route through the Wye valley on the English bank, while the Wye Valley Walk follows the Welsh bank.

== Medieval period ==
When the Normans conquered the region in the 11th century they immediately built major castles at Chepstow and Monmouth to defend the territory. Smaller castles were built at St Briavels, Ruardean, Goodrich and Wilton Castle.

Tintern Abbey was founded in 1131 by Cistercian monks, and largely rebuilt in the 13th century. It is the best-preserved medieval abbey in Wales and an outstanding example of Gothic architecture.

Many of the smaller villages in the area probably date from the Middle Ages, and much of this expansion was probably associated with the early iron industry. The medieval iron industry consumed large quantities of charcoal and much of the woodland was coppiced for this purpose. Trellech was one of the largest communities in Wales during this period.

== Development of industry ==
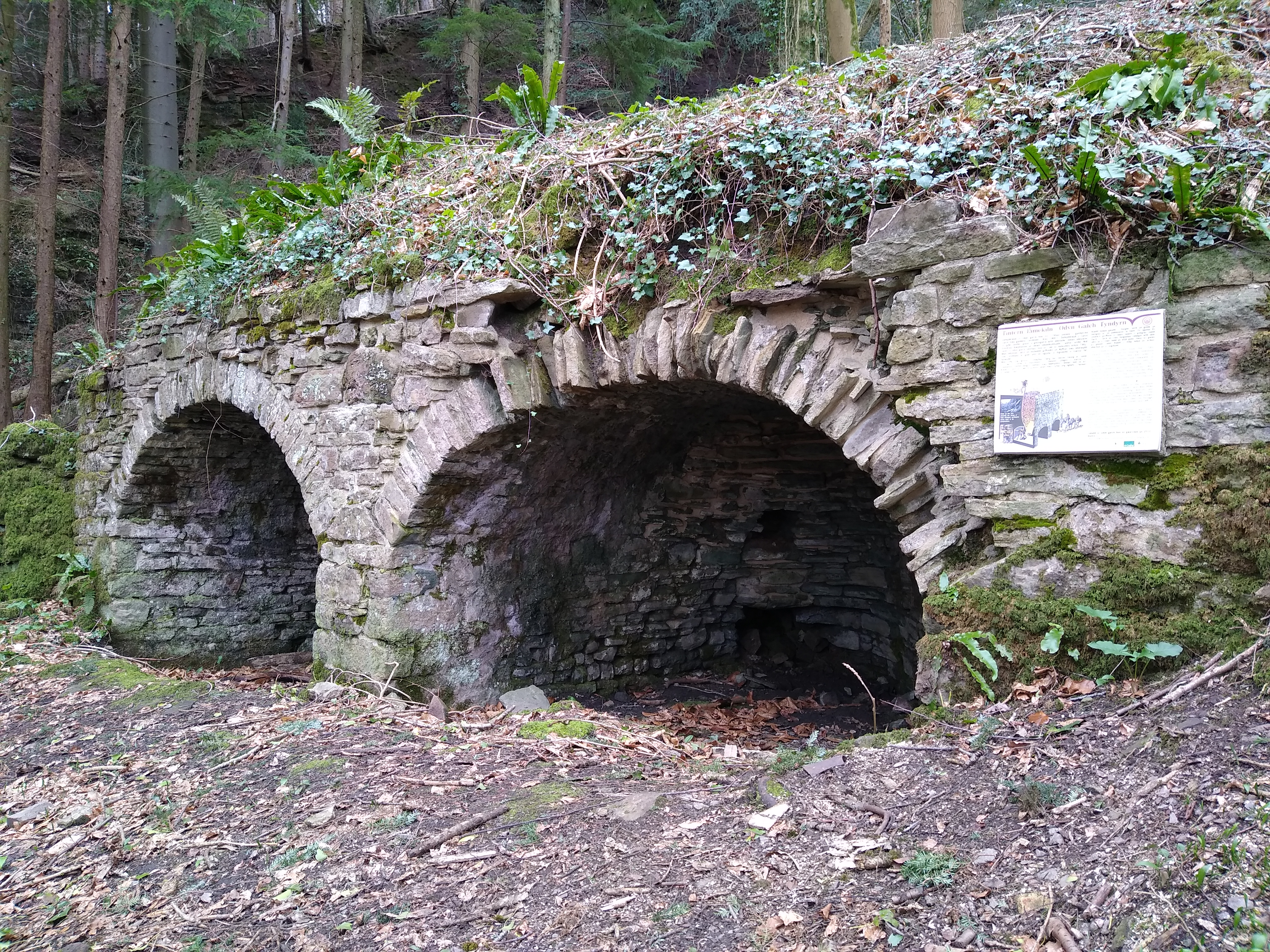
Ruins of an 18th-century limekiln at Tintern

Iron has been made in the Wye Valley since Roman times, using the ready supply of timber, good quality ore and abundant charcoal from the Forest of Dean. The river provided transport for the raw materials and finished product, and with the introduction of the blast furnace in the 16th century, its tributaries began to be used for water power.

The first brass made in Britain was founded in the Angidy valley – which joins the Wye at Tintern – in 1566. Wire-making followed, with water mills situated on all the tributaries of the lower Wye. The area resounded to the noise and smoke of heavy industry for the next 400 years and gave rise to many pioneering industries. For instance, Whitebrook became famous for paper milling, when wallpaper became a fashionable way to decorate houses. At Redbrook, copper works were established by 1691, and a century later the village became one of the world's major tinplate manufacturing centres. This industry survived until the 1960s and was renowned for producing the thinnest, highest quality plate in the world. The Lydbrook valley was also a thriving centre for metal industries, such as the manufacture of telegraph cables.

The valley woodlands were carefully managed to produce mature trees for shipbuilding, or by coppicing for charcoal, and to provide bark for tanning. The valley industries were also massive consumers of timber. A ship of 150 tons, for example, required 3,000 wagonloads of timber to complete – and in 1824, 13 ships were launched at Brockweir alone.

The river was the economic backbone of the region, providing an important means of transport, trade and communication. In late medieval times, salmon weirs hindered free passage on the river, but the Wye Navigation Act in 1662 enabled the river's potential to be developed. By 1727 shallow draught boats could get upstream beyond Hereford, and a significant shipbuilding industry developed at Monmouth, Llandogo, Brockweir and Chepstow. However, by 1835 it was stated that the Wye "can scarcely be considered a commercial highway" above Monmouth, and by the 1880s Brockweir bridge was the effective upper limit of navigation.

As the 19th century progressed, the valley's industries gradually declined, and management of the woodlands lessened when there was no longer a ready market for their products.

== Origins of British tourism ==
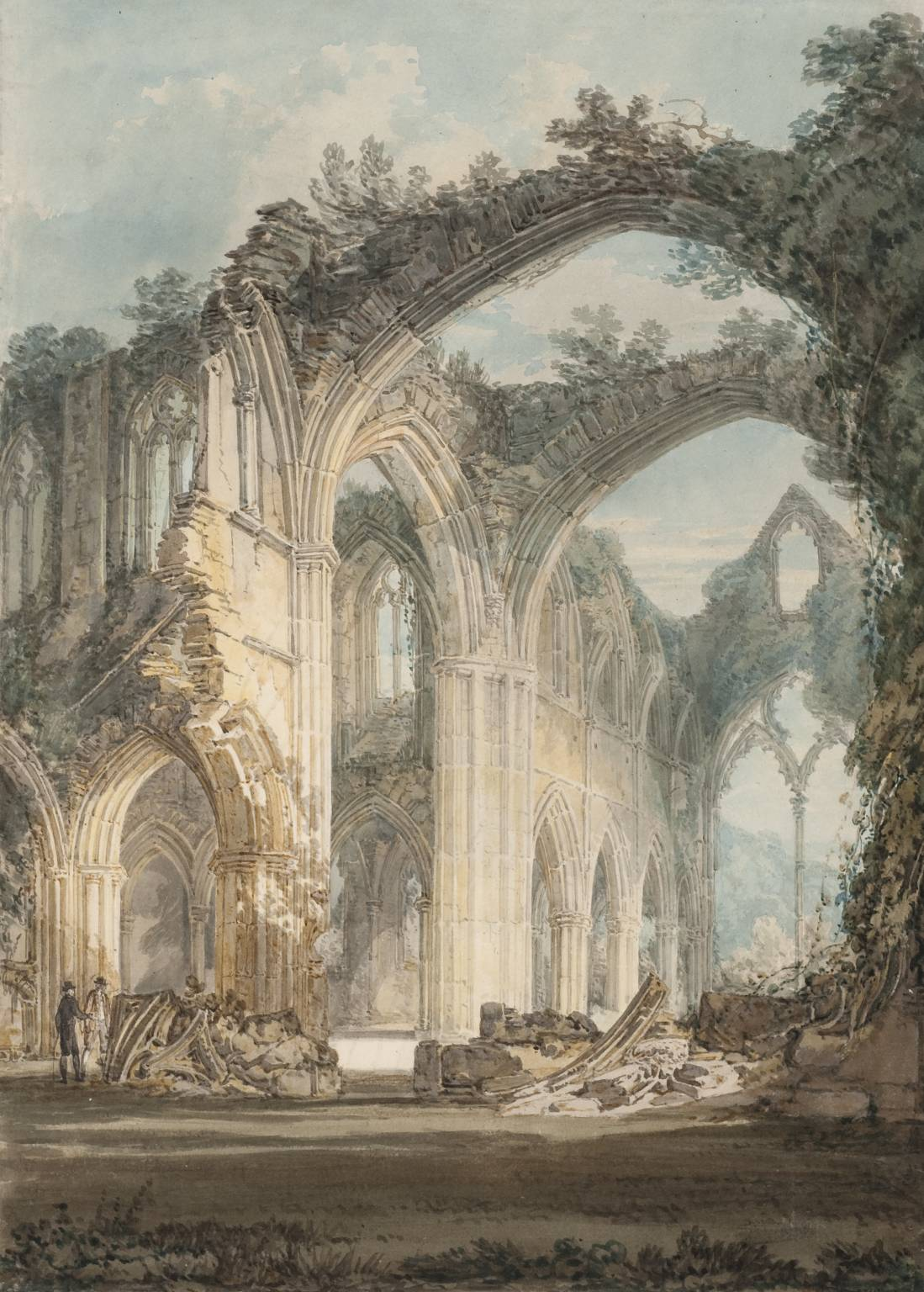
The Chancel and Crossing of Tintern Abbey, Looking towards the East Window by J. M. W. Turner, 1794

The Wye Valley witnessed the birth of British tourism in the 18th century. The earliest known appreciation of the area's spectacular beauty can be dated to the beginning of the century, when John Kyrle developed the 'Prospect' at Ross-on-Wye, and it was later mentioned in verse by Alexander Pope.

In 1745, John Egerton, later Bishop of Durham, started taking friends on boat trips down the valley from the rectory at Ross. The area became more widely known following the publication of works by the poet Thomas Gray, and, in particular, Observations on the River Wye by the Reverend William Gilpin, published in 1782. The first illustrated tour guide to be published in Britain, it helped travellers locate and enjoy the most "Picturesque" aspects of the countryside. Regular excursions began to be established from Ross, the boat journey to Chepstow taking two days.

Some of the most famous poets, writers and artists of the day made the pilgrimage to the great sights of Goodrich, Tintern and Chepstow – among them Coleridge, Thackeray and Turner. Wordsworth was also captivated by the area, writing Lines written a few miles above Tintern Abbey in 1798. Poetic influence continued to be felt in the next century, as in 1811, popular 'peasant poet', Robert Bloomfield wrote 'The Banks of Wye; a Poem in Four Books' providing account of an 1807 trip made by him and a party of friends down the River Wye and surrounding areas.

The Wye Valley was among the first British landscapes to be 'discovered' by tourists, drawn chiefly by its river scenery, and guidebooks, engravings and paintings brought a steady flow of visitors. Viewpoints were specially constructed, including the Kymin above Monmouth, whose round house gives panoramic views across the town. Travellers also visited the cliff ascent and walks at Piercefield. Most 'picturesque' scenes, however, were sketched from river level, with the water in the foreground and the forests, cliffs, and castle and abbey ruins behind.

== Transport ==
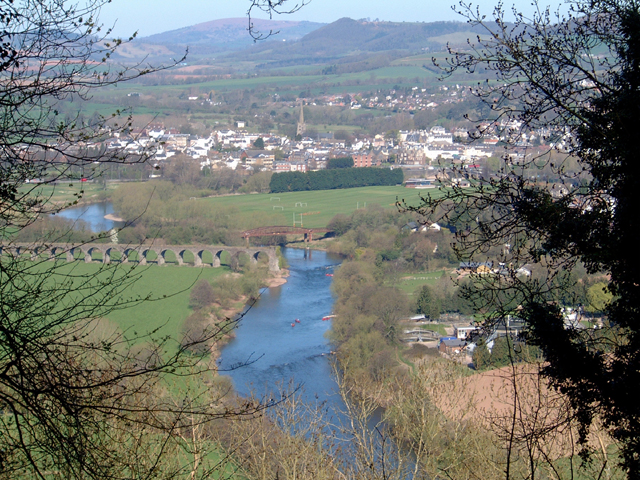
Missing rail links in Monmouth, foreground Wye Valley Railway and background Ross and Monmouth Railway linked to missing Hereford, Ross and Gloucester Railway in Ross-on-Wye.

In 1813 the Monmouth Tramroad linked Coalway (near Coleford), Redbrook and Monmouth. This was the world's first railed-way to make specific powers in its Act of Parliament to allow for the charging of fares to passengers.

The standard gauge Wye Valley Railway line between Chepstow, Monmouth and Ross opened much later, in 1876. This made the valley more accessible and popular to tourists. In the early 20th century, crowds of up to 1300 would travel on a special train journey to see Tintern Abbey on the night of the harvest moon. The line closed to passengers in 1959, although sections remain as bridleways and footbridges. There are now main line railway stations at Hereford and Chepstow.

The road network in the lower Wye valley remained essentially undeveloped during the rise of the Valley's industrialisation, until a series of Turnpike trusts were authorised during the 18th century. It was not until 1828 that the current Wye Valley road, the A466, was first constructed. The area became more accessible by road to much of the country with the building of the M50 between the M5 and Ross-on-Wye, and the opening of the Severn Bridge (now part of the M48) in 1966.

== National Landscape management ==
A film about natural resource management of the Wye Valley Woodlands Special Area of Conservation and Area of Outstanding Natural Beauty.

The Wye Valley Area of Outstanding Natural Beauty (AONB) was designated in 1971. The designation indicates the importance of recognising and preserving the area's distinctive qualities, for the benefit of present and future generations. Administratively the area is very complex, being the only protected landscape to straddle the border between England and Wales. The counties of Herefordshire, Monmouthshire and Gloucestershire are each in a different government region. Co-ordination of conservation across these political boundaries is undertaken by an AONB unit and Joint Advisory Committee. A Management Plan for the AONB enlists a range of partners in conserving and enhancing its beauty for the benefit of present and future generations.

The area is predominantly rural, and many people make a living from tourism, agriculture or forestry. Ross-on-Wye is the only town within the National Landscape itself, but Hereford, Monmouth, Coleford and Chepstow lie just outside its boundaries.

In 2023, all AONBs in the UK were rebranded as National Landscapes, though still keep their designation as Areas of Outstanding Natural Beauty.

The navigation of the tidal part of the Wye (below Bigsweir) comes under the control of the Gloucester Harbour Trustees as Competent Harbour Authority.

== See also ==
- Biblins Bridge
- Kingstone Brewery, Meadow Farm, Tintern
- Wye Valley Brewery
- Wye Valley Walk
