= Wye Valley Railway =

Disused railway in England and Wales

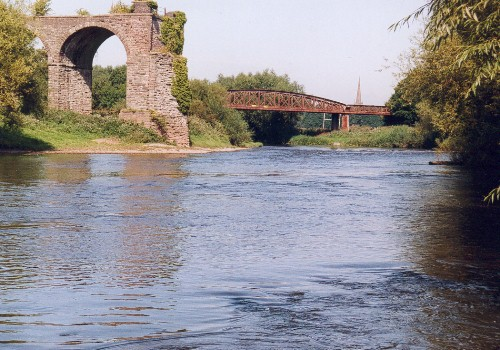
- The remains of the viaduct carrying the railway over the River Wye in Monmouth; the Ross and Monmouth line's viaduct is beyond

Overview
- Headquarters: Chepstow
- Locale: Gloucestershire, England–Monmouthshire, Wales
- Dates of operation: 1876–1964 (southern section remained open to c. 1990)

Technical
- Track gauge: 4 ft 8 1/2 in (1,435 mm) standard gauge
- Length: 15 miles (24 km)

The Wye Valley Railway was a standard gauge railway that ran for nearly 15 miles (24 km) along the Lower Wye Valley between the towns of Chepstow and Monmouth, crossing several times between Wales and England. Opened on 1 November 1876, it was leased to, and worked by, the Great Western Railway (GWR), before being fully absorbed by the GWR in 1905.

The line was built with the hope of becoming part of a through trunk route between Bristol and the industrial Midlands, a development which never took place. Although tourism provided some new passenger business in the late Victorian and Edwardian periods, the line's income was always weak.

After nationalisation, British Railways reviewed its viability and withdrew the passenger service on 5 January 1959. A limited goods and mineral service continued until 1964, after which residual traffic continued on the southern end of the route to Tintern Quarry, until 1981, and Dayhouse Quarry, near Tidenham, until 1990.

== Origins ==
=== Plateways ===
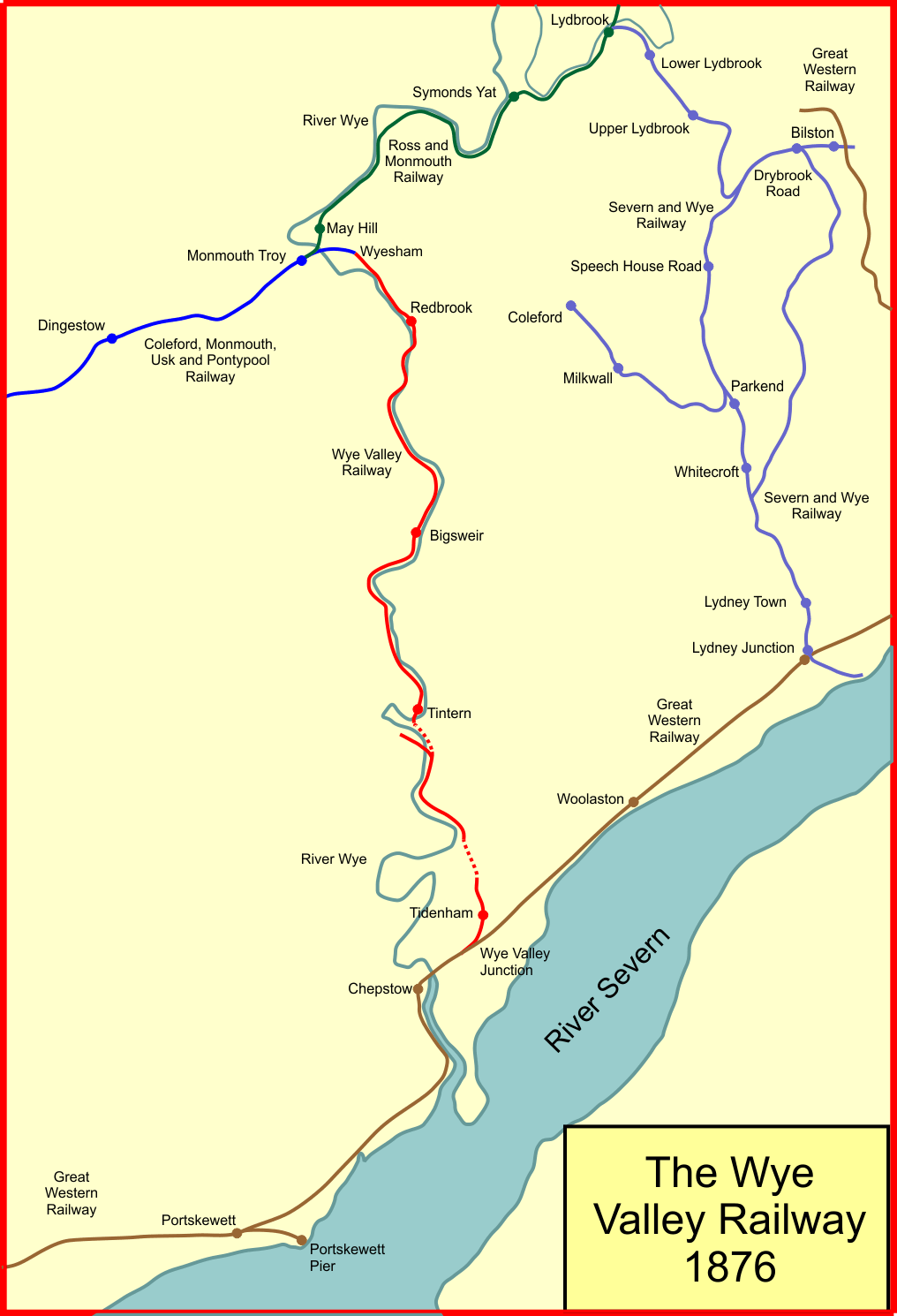
The Wye Valley Railway in 1876

The town of Monmouth had become an important regional centre by the 19th century, with a developing local industry. Communication with Chepstow, on the River Severn, had long been undertaken by river transport along the River Wye or on the roads following the Wye Valley, and some mineral industries had been established along this route.

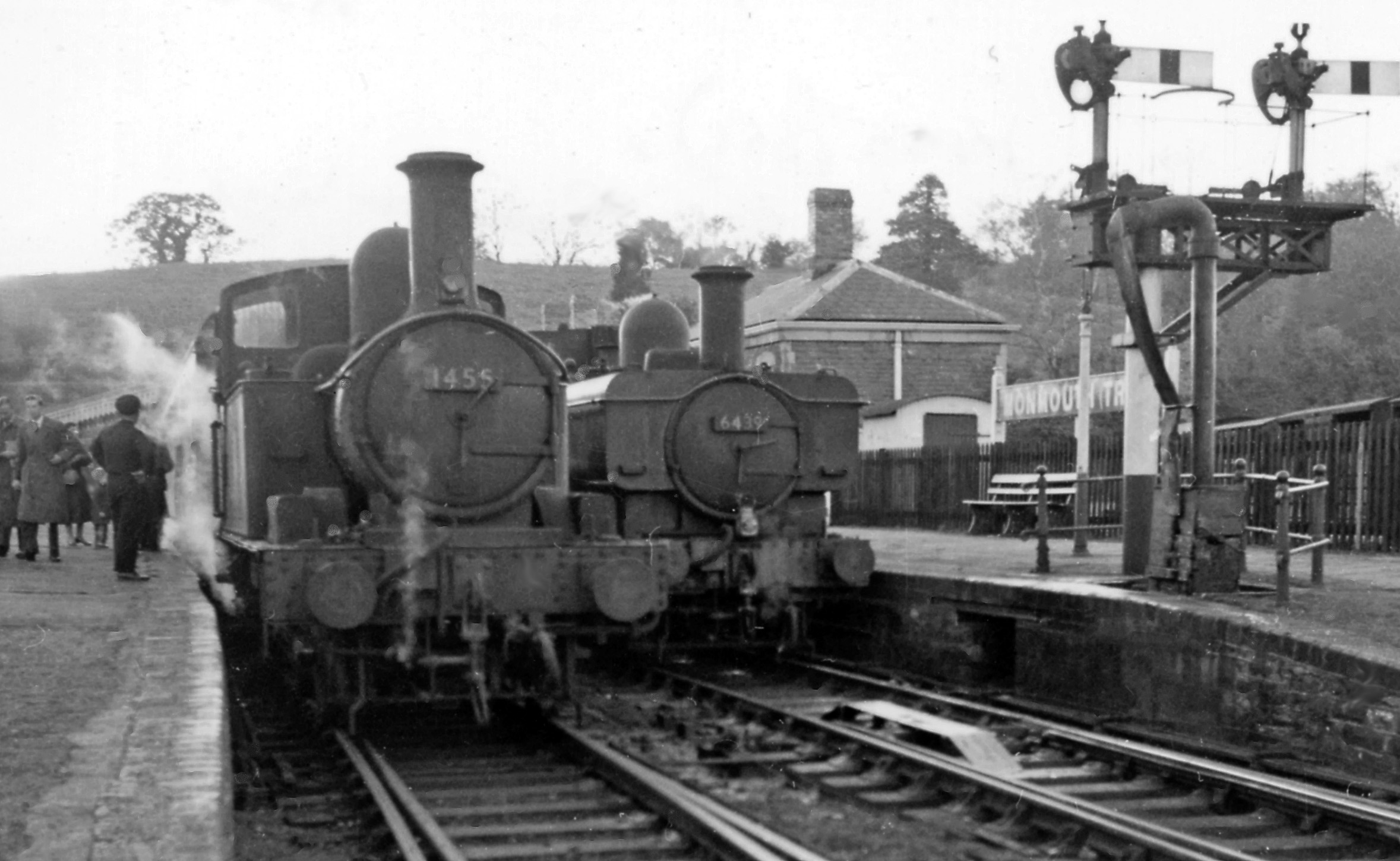
Monmouth (Troy) Station; the train on the right was for the Wye Valley line

By contrast, the nearby Forest of Dean was the source of a considerable output of minerals – coal, iron ore and stone – and the poor road network in the Forest had led early on to the provision of tramways there on a small scale. A more ambitious scheme resulted in the Monmouth Railway, (Note: Not to be confused with the Monmouthshire Railway, from Newport to Pontypool.) which ran from east of Coleford to Monmouth at May Hill, on the east side of the River Wye. This toll plateway, with a gauge of 3 ft 6 in (1,070 mm), was horse operated. It opened in stages between 1812 and 1817.

At the same time the Severn and Wye Railway was under construction from the northern and western parts of the Forest to Lydney on the River Severn. Its first section opened as a plateway in 1810 and the line was converted to a broad gauge edge railway much later, in the 1860s.

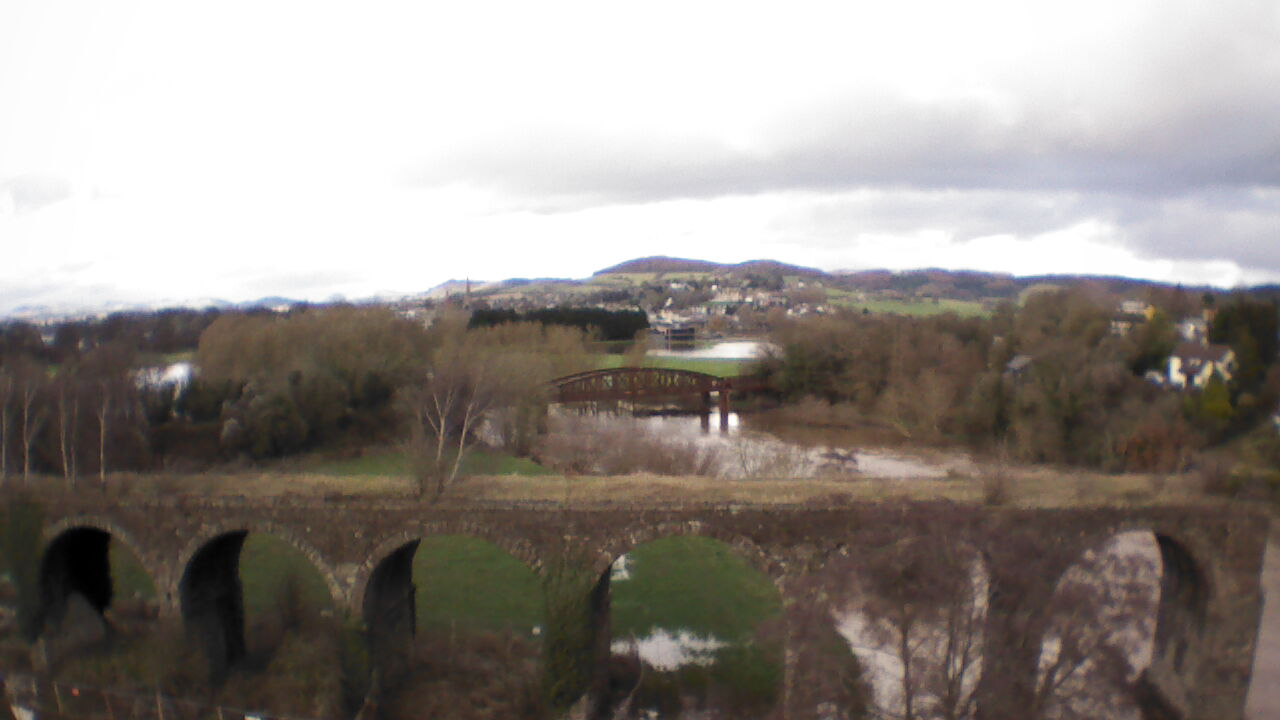
Bridges over the River Wye in Monmouth: foreground Wye Valley Railway and background Ross and Monmouth Railway.

=== Early railways ===
A main line railway came to the region when the South Wales Railway opened from 1850; it eventually completed a through line from Milford Haven (Note: Here "Milford Haven" refers to the waterway of that name; the terminal railway station was later known as Neyland.) to London in association with its ally, the Great Western Railway. Settlements connected to a railway line found that the cost of materials brought in became much cheaper, and local produce found better prices at market.

The Hereford, Ross and Gloucester Railway was opened in 1855 crossing the north of the region.

Coleford was considered the capital of the Forest of Dean and it was the mineral production of the immediate area that encouraged railway access. The Coleford, Monmouth, Usk and Pontypool Railway was authorised in 1853, intended to convey iron ore output by a shorter route than hitherto, to the ironworks of Nantyglo, Dowlais and Ebbw Vale. Its route would avoid the steep ascent, for loaded trains, of the Western Valley line. As well as building a new line from Monmouth to Little Mill, (near Pontypool, on the Newport, Abergavenny and Hereford Railway) to Monmouth, the CMU&PR was authorised to purchase part of the Monmouth Railway and convert it to main line standards suitable for locomotive operation: this would form the section from Coleford to Monmouth.

The CMU&PR opened from Little Mill to Usk on 2 June 1856, and on 12 October 1857 it was opened as far as Monmouth Troy station. Reaching Coleford, the primary object of building the line, required a crossing of the River Wye, and conversion of the Monmouth Railway. As well as relaying all of its permanent way, this would have involved considerable realignment to smooth out the worst of the sharp tramroad curves, and opening out the tunnel profile. However at this stage the CMU&PR had largely exhausted its financial resources.

After taking stock of the situation, and achieving a partial financial recovery, the CMU&PR set about building the bridge and viaduct to cross the River Wye at Monmouth, and extend its line as far as a mineral depot (Note: The depot was described as a "wharf". This was a commonly used term for tramway depots at the time, and did not imply a riverside location.) at Wyesham, one mile (1.6 km) from Monmouth. A transshipment facility was set up there, and the Monmouth Railway continued to operate, unmodernised, as far as that point. The extension of the CMU&PR from the Troy station to Wyesham opened on 1 July 1861.

== Planning and construction ==
=== Authorisation ===
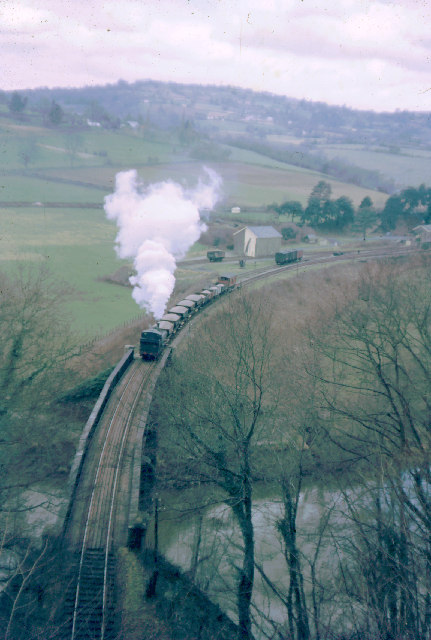
A Stone train in steam in 1963 leaving Tintern station.

In 1865 definite proposals were put forward to build a railway from Monmouth to Chepstow. At Monmouth it was to make a junction with the Coleford, Monmouth, Usk and Pontypool Railway 21 chains (1,400 ft; 420 m) east of the eastern end of its Wye River Bridge near Monmouth.

The route was to follow the River Wye but the watercourse was extremely sinuous, and for much of its course it was hemmed in by steep hills. The 1865 projected route was submitted to Parliament in the 1866 session; the line was to be called the Wye Valley Railway. Extremely optimistic forecasts were circulated by the promoters, including the assertion that the line would form part of an artery to the North of England from Bristol, when the Severn Tunnel was opened. Tourism was becoming an important factor, and the natural beauty of the Wye Valley was expected to encourage revenue from that source.

The South Wales Railway had been constructed on the broad gauge, and it was assumed at first that the line from Monmouth would join it at Chepstow, and also be constructed on that gauge. The Coleford, Monmouth, Usk and Pontypool Railway was built on the narrow gauge (as standard gauge was then known), but interchange with that line was not considered important. (Note: Mixed gauge would have been needed between Wyesham and Monmouth.) Nevertheless, national government had taken an interest in the gauge of new and existing railways, and a Gauge Commission had been appointed to recommend policy. This recommended that no new lines should be built on the broad gauge, except for certain designated extensions to the existing broad gauge network. This resulted in the Railway Regulation (Gauge) Act 1846 (9 & 10 Vict. c. 57), which mandated that recommendation. The intended gauge of the Wye Valley Railway was changed to narrow gauge, no doubt recognising the reality that the South Wales Railway itself would eventually be converted. (Note: The South Wales Railway was converted to narrow gauge in 1872.)

Wye Valley Railway Act 1866
- Act of Parliament
- Parliament of the United Kingdom
- Long title: An Act for making Railways from the South Wales Line of the Great Western Railway to the Coleford, Monmouth, Usk, and Pontypool Railway, and to the authorized Line of the South Wales and Great Western Direct Railway; and for other Purposes.
- Citation: 29 & 30 Vict. c. ccclvii

Dates
- Royal assent: 10 August 1866

The Wye Valley Railway (Note: Christiansen refers to the company on page 135 as the Monmouth and Wye Valley Railway, but this is not used by other authorities.) was authorised by the Wye Valley Railway Act 1866 (29 & 30 Vict. c. ccclvii) on 10 August 1866. Share capital was to be £230,000. It was to run from a junction with the CMU&PR at Wyesham, near Monmouth, to Wye Valley Junction, near Chepstow.

=== Construction ===
Wye Valley Railway Amendment Act 1871
- Act of Parliament
- Parliament of the United Kingdom
- Long title: An Act to extend the time granted to the Wye Valley Railway Company for the construction of their railway.
- Citation: 34 & 35 Vict. c. xlix

Dates
- Royal assent: 16 June 1871

Text of statute as originally enacted

The timing of the authorisation was unfortunate, as on 10 May 1866 the banking firm of Overend, Gurney and Company suspended payments, having run out of money to discharge its liabilities, and the surrounding financial turmoil provoked a massive failure of the availability of investment money. The company found it impossible to secure the necessary capital, and the start of construction was much delayed. In fact nothing was done for several years, and as the authorising act specified a time limit, it was necessary to obtain a further act of Parliament allowing an extension of time. This was the Wye Valley Railway Amendment Act 1871 (34 & 35 Vict. c. xlix) of 16 June 1871.

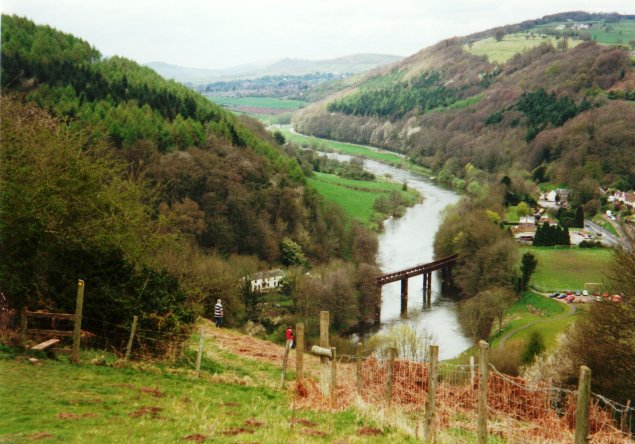
Looking down on the line at Redbrook

Still it proved impossible to get subscriptions, and a financial launch in 1874 offered £230,000 of shares to the public. Confidence was intended to be inspired by the assurance that the Great Western Railway were to work the line, guaranteeing (it was claimed) 6% on capital for five years. The railway was to "open a new and much shorter route from Liverpool and the north, Birmingham and the Midland districts, to Newport, Cardiff, Bristol and the West of England, and this through route will be very materially improved on the completion of the Severn Tunnel now in course of construction." A further act of Parliament in 1874 authorised certain deviations of the formerly approved route, in particular affecting the crossing of the River Wye at Tintern, and the course down the eastern bank of the river.

Construction was started at Tintern on 26 May 1874, the contractor Reid Brothers and Co having undertaken to complete the line by December 1875. The technical aspects of the construction were difficult, especially at the southern end of the route. There were two tunnels; the longer was Tidenham (or Denhill) tunnel. When completed it was 1,188 yards (1,086 m) in length (having been planned at 715 yards (654 m)). The actual construction cost of the line was £318,000, the greater part of the expenditure being on the tunnel.

=== Tintern Wireworks branch ===
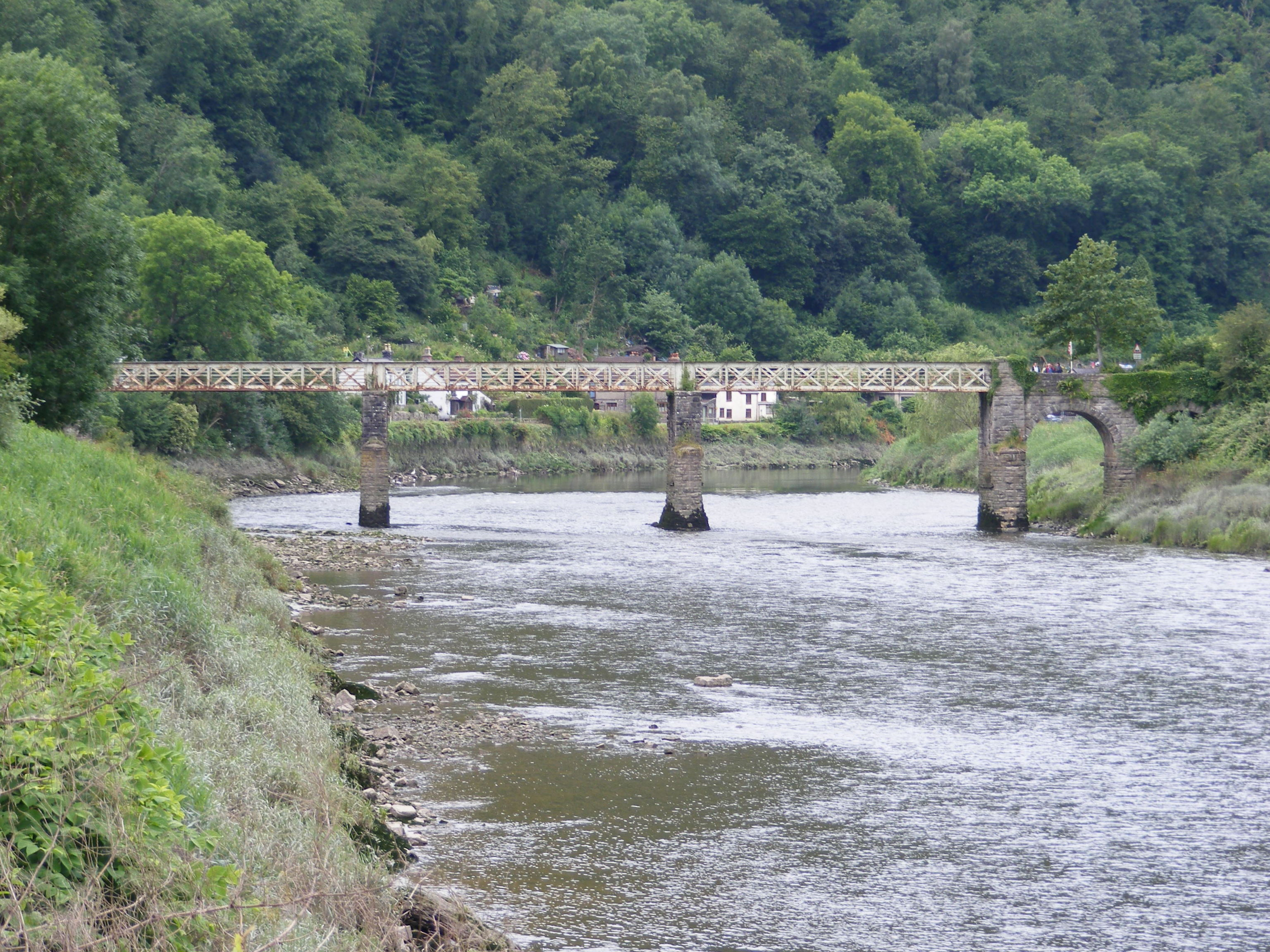
The river bridge provided for the Wireworks branch.

The delay to 1874 had resulted in a reassessment of the route of the line. In particular the route at Tintern took the line to the east of the town, and the station was some distance away. A petition was raised by residents and industrialists at Tintern, asking for a branch line to serve the Tintern town and the Wireworks factory there. This was agreed to, and a remarkable undertaking was given by the Wye Valley Company in the Wye Valley Railway Amendment Act 1875 (38 & 39 Vict. c. li): the branch was to be ready by 1 November 1874, and be for the exclusive use of the landowners. No charge was to be made for transportation on the branch. The company was to pay £3,086 for the land, but the branch was not to become part of the Wye Valley Railway Company undertakings without the consent of the landowners.

The branch involved a substantial bridge over the river Wye, 207 feet (63 m) in length, but was nevertheless ready for traffic on 6 August 1875, although the Wye Valley Railway main line was not yet open. Meanwhile, the Wireworks, the principal producer of business on the line, had ceased trading. The line lay dormant until the early 1880s when the Abbey Wire and Tinplate Company established a business there, but this ceased trading in 1901. However the hoped-for passenger station was not made: the branch was to serve industrial locations only.

== Independent operation ==
=== Opening ===
It had been anticipated that the line would be ready for traffic during 1875. It was announced in the press in April 1876 that "it has been decided to open the reach of the Wye Valley Railway, from Monmouth (Troy), to Redbrook, for goods traffic, this week. The line will be opened to Tintern for general traffic about Midsummer. The entire route to Chepstow will probably be opened next spring."

On 8 June 1876 a train ran to Redbrook: "On Thursday a Great Western Railway Company's goods train ran from Monmouth to Redbrook and back, thereby opening up this portion of the Wye Valley line to goods traffic... An effort is being made to open the line for goods traffic through, from Monmouth to Redbrook and Tintern...

On 29 September 1876 the line was inspected by Colonel Rich of the Board of Trade.

The formal opening of the line took place on 19 October 1876, when the directors and their friends travelled over the line. The newspaper reports, no doubt fed by the company, insisted that this was "establishing a route of great importance for through traffic between Bristol and the West of England, and Birmingham, Liverpool and other towns in the north... The line will not be opened to the public until 1 November."

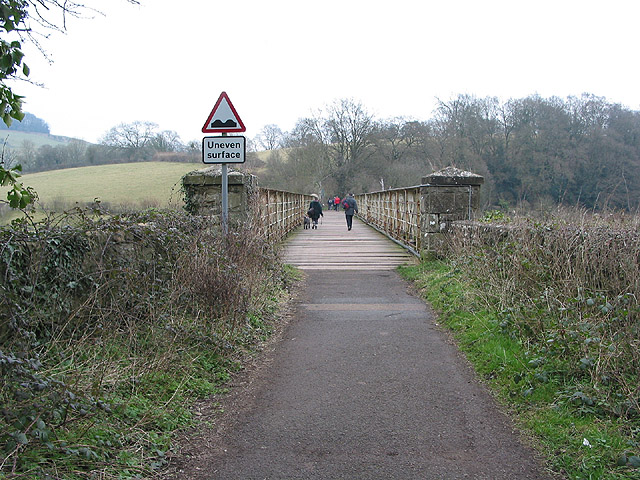
Footbridge over the Wye at Tintern

In fact the ceremonial opening took place on 28 October 1876. This was for the directors and their friends, and the full public opening followed on 1 November 1876. The line was leased to, and worked by the Great Western Railway, for 55% of gross receipts for five years, and 50% thereafter. The line was single, with a passing loop at Tintern; there were four passenger trains and one goods train each way daily. There were four intermediate stations on the line, and trains ran from the existing station at Monmouth to Chepstow or Portskewett (for the Bristol ferry) on the South Wales Main Line. The intermediate stations on the line were Redbrook, Bigsweir, Tintern and Tidenham. At Monmouth the new line used the Wyesham extension of the Coleford, Monmouth, Usk and Pontypool Railway.

=== Financial difficulties ===
The financial state of the company was poor from the outset; construction had cost more that was budgeted and the company operated at a loss. New preference stock was issued soon after the line's opening: the Morning Post reported that the company was "issuing £105,000 [of] 5% preference stock ... for the completion of ... the new wharves at Chepstow; branches to tinplate-works and other works and mills on the line, about one mile (1.6 km) in length; the Brockweir bridge and enlarged sidings, made at the request of the Great Western Railway Company."

Much was made in this period of an extension at Chepstow to wharves there, giving access to shipping on the River Severn. The expenditure proved fruitless, and at a shareholders' meeting in September 1881 the chairman "did not see any prospect of their becoming profitable to the company". At that time "the gross receipts of the line had fallen off. The net receipts from the Great Western Company were insufficient to pay the interest on the 1875 debentures".

There were serious irregularities with the company's financial management. It became evident that there had been financial impropriety on the part of the chairman, W. Hawes, and in March 1881 a shareholders' investigation into the financial affairs of the company was set up. The company likely went into receivership at this time. Hawes was ousted and a new chairman, A. Jerrard, was appointed. Only one dividend was ever paid by the company, and this was during the construction period. (Note: Where there is no income, there can be no justification for a distribution to shareholders. Paying them a dividend out of their own capital is hardly proper.)

Efforts were made to improve the line's financial position, but these were unsuccessful and the company went into receivership for a second time in 1889. By then it had become obvious that the company was unviable, and discussions took place with the Great Western Railway with a view to the larger company buying the Wye Valley concern. The terms of sale to the GWR were finally agreed in December 1904. The GWR was to pay 2.5% of face value on ordinary shares, and 12.5% on preference shares. Ordinary shareholders had thus lost nearly all their money. The sale took formal effect on 1 July 1905. As the GWR had been working the line from the beginning, there was no obvious outward change so far as the travelling public were concerned.

=== Ross and Monmouth Railway ===
The Ross and Monmouth Railway opened on 4 August 1873, but it stopped short at the May Hill station in Monmouth, until the Ross company's own bridge over the Wye was ready; the connection to Troy station was opened on 1 May 1874.

== GWR ownership ==
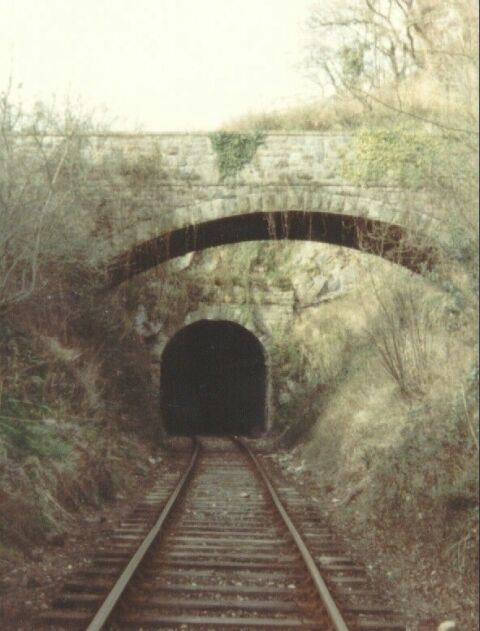
Tidenham Tunnel - geograph.org.uk - 243896

In 1907, soon after purchasing the line, the Great Western Railway implemented an electric token signalling system in order to allow more frequent trains. The railway had previously been operated under a basic staff and ticket system with three sections, Monmouth Troy to Wyesham Junction, Wyesham Junction to Tintern and Tintern to Wye Valley Junction. In addition, an electric train tablet system was installed, enabling long section working at quiet periods. The changes required staff at Monmouth Troy, Wyesham Junction, Redbrook, Bigsweir, Tintern, Tidenham and Wyesham Junction, resulting in a significant increase in signalling costs. A rationalisation scheme was introduced in 1927 and several stations became unstaffed.

The GWR constructed a series of halts throughout the 1920s and 1930s in an attempt to increase passenger revenue. Llandogo Halt and Whitebrook Halt were opened in 1927, followed by Brockweir Halt in 1929, Penallt Halt and Wyesham Halt in 1931 and Netherhope Halt in 1932. Tutshill Halt was added in 1934 on the main line between Chepstow and Wye Valley Junction.

=== Tourism ===
The scenic beauty of the lower Wye Valley was utilised by the GWR in campaigns to encourage tourism, and this traffic provided a sizeable proportion of the line's income. Excursions were run from Gloucester, Cheltenham and Cardiff to Tintern for visitors to Tintern Abbey, and there was also an enhanced regular passenger service during the summer.

In the 1930s diesel railcars were introduced for use on the lightly used passenger services; the Railway Magazine reported in May 1936:

On March 23, railcar no. 14 entered service to work 17 existing steam-train services, and also to provide two new passenger services, in the Newport, Chepstow, Monmouth, Pontypool Road, Panteg and Blaenavon area... The daily number of diesel railcar services is now 132.

== Decline ==
The diesel railcars represented an attempt to carry light passenger traffic at lower cost, but from the interwar period onwards competition from road transport increasingly undercut the line's income; goods traffic began to be transported by motor lorry and omnibuses reduced passenger income. This process continued relentlessly following the nationalisation of the railways in 1948. The line was said to be losing £20,000 on its passenger operation, and the decision was taken to stop running passenger trains. The last such train ran on 4 January 1959.

A limited goods train operation continued, but that too was unsustainable and ceased on 6 January 1964. Freight traffic continued on the southern half of the route between Chepstow and Tintern Quarry.

The section from Tidenham to Tintern Quarry closed in 1981, and the rest of the line was abandoned when Tidenham Quarry closed on 29 March 1990.

== Route and stations ==
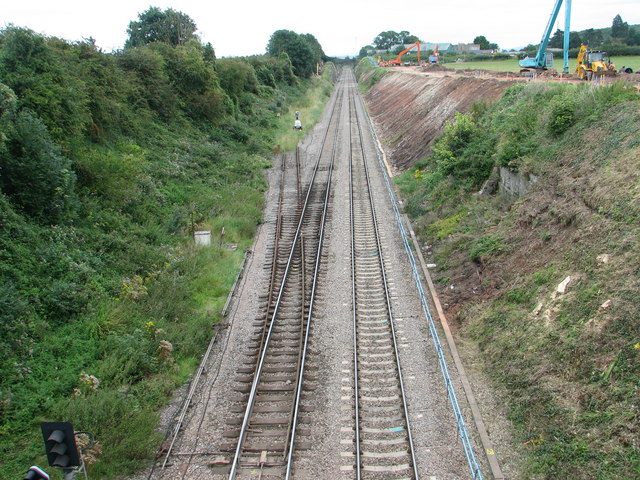
Wye Valley Junction, where the railway joined the Gloucester to Newport Line.

The northern terminal of the line was the Troy station at Monmouth, on the line from Little Mill Junction, near Pontypool to Ross-on-Wye. The line left the station in an easterly direction, and immediately crossed the River Wye and adjacent low-lying ground by a viaduct. Wyesham Junction followed, where the Coleford Railway diverged. Following the east bank of the Wye, the railway reached Redbrook station, crossing then to the west bank by Redbrook Viaduct, 101 yards (92 m). There was a halt at Whitebrook, and the next station was Bigsweir, adjacent to a road bridge over the Wye, but with little population nearby. The station name was later changed to St Briavels. Next was Llandogo Halt, serving a sizable community, and then Brockweir Halt, although the village of Brockweir was on the other side of the river, requiring a ferry crossing until a bridge was built in 1906. (Note: From listed buildings website; Mitchell and Smith say 1904.)

South of Brockweir the river makes a considerable westward loop, and a railway alignment directly serving Tintern would have been challenging. Instead the line provided a Tintern station some distance east of the community; it was the only passing place on the line. The route continued south, crossing the river, running through Tintern Tunnel, 182 yards (166 m), to penetrate the spur of the hill, and running on the eastern side of the Wye. Immediately south of the tunnel the Wireworks branch trailed in. It served the tinplate works at Abbey Hill and had its own substantial bridge of 69 yards (63 m) span, crossing the Wye.

Tintern Quarry was located some distance further south, and after that point the railway diverged from the river, passing through Tidenham Tunnel, 1,190 yards (1,090 m), to Netherhope Halt. Next passing the location of the later Tidenham Quarry (or Dayhouse Quarry), the line joined the Gloucester to South Wales Line at Wye Valley Junction. Following the main line, Tutshill Halt was next, served by branch trains, followed by Chepstow station.

=== Locations ===
- Monmouth Troy House; terminal station of Coleford, Monmouth, Usk and Pontypool Railway; opened 1857; renamed Monmouth Troy 1904; closed 5 January 1959;
- Wyesham Halt; opened 12 January 1931; closed 5 January 1959;
- Wyesham Junction; divergence of Coleford branch;
- Redbrook; opened 1 November 1876; renamed Redbrook-on-Wye 11 September 1933; closed 5 January 1959;
- Redbrook Viaduct, 101 yards (92 m);
- Penallt Halt; opened 1 August 1931; closed 5 January 1959;
- Whitebrook Halt; opened 1 February 1927; closed 5 January 1959;
- Bigsweir; opened 1 November 1876; renamed St Briavels & Llandogo 1909; renamed St Briavels 1927; closed 5 January 1959;;
- Llandogo Halt; opened 9 March 1927; closed 5 January 1959;
- Brockweir Halt; opened 19 August 1929; closed 5 January 1959;
- Tintern; opened 1 November 1876; closed 5 January 1959;
- Tintern Tunnel; 182 yards (166 m);
- Wireworks Siding; convergence of wireworks branch;
- Tintern Quarry Halt; unadvertised halt for quarry workmen; in use in 1954;
- Tintern Quarry;
- Tidenham Tunnel; 1,190 yards (1,090 m);
- Netherhope Halt; opened 16 May 1932; closed 5 January 1959;
- Tidenham; opened 1 November 1876; closed 1 January 1917; reopened 1 February 1918; closed 5 January 1959;
- Wye Valley Junction; convergence with Gloucester to Newport line;
- Tutshill Halt; on main line; opened 9 July 1934; closed 5 January 1959;
- Chepstow Viaduct;
- Chepstow.

=== Gradients ===
On leaving Monmouth, the line climbed at 1 in 66 to Wyesham Junction, then fell at 1 in 80 to Redbrook. From there minor undulations followed for some distance until just before Tintern, where the line climbed at 1 in 80 and then 1 in 100 to the southern end of Tidenham Tunnel. From there the line descended once more at 1 in 66 to Wye Valley Junction.

== Today's remnants ==
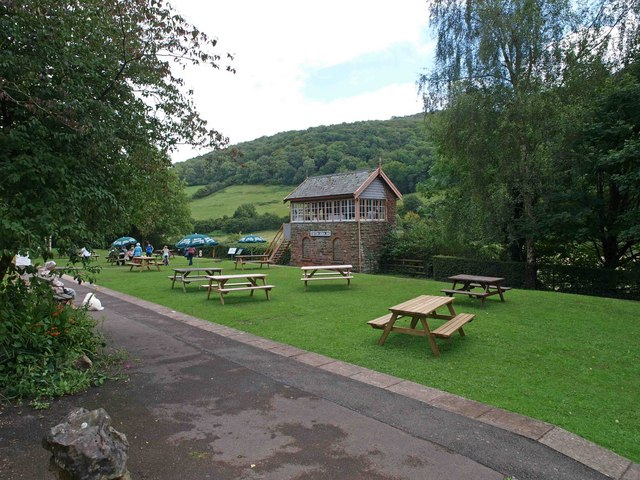
The picnic site and former signal box at Tintern Station in 2008

Many of the line's structures are still in existence. The three former railway bridges across the River Wye are still standing: Penallt Viaduct, which now carries a footpath between Redbrook and Penallt, the Wireworks Branch bridge, also in use as a footpath, and the impressive 21-arch viaduct at Monmouth, although the central metal section above the river has been removed. The station building and goods shed at St Briavels Station are still mainly intact.

Tintern station was purchased by the local county council and has operated as a visitor centre, cafe and museum since 1975.

Monmouth Troy station building was removed from Monmouth and rebuilt at Winchcombe station on the heritage Gloucestershire Warwickshire Railway.

In April 2021 the line from Tidenham to Tintern, including Tidenham Tunnel, was opened up for walkers and cyclists. It is known as the Wye Valley Greenway.

== See also ==
- Ross and Monmouth Railway
- Coleford, Monmouth, Usk and Pontypool Railway
