= Welsh Bicknor =

Village in Herefordshire, England

Coordinates: 51.855064°N 2.588711°W

Welsh Bicknor: Welsh: Llangystennin Garth Brenni
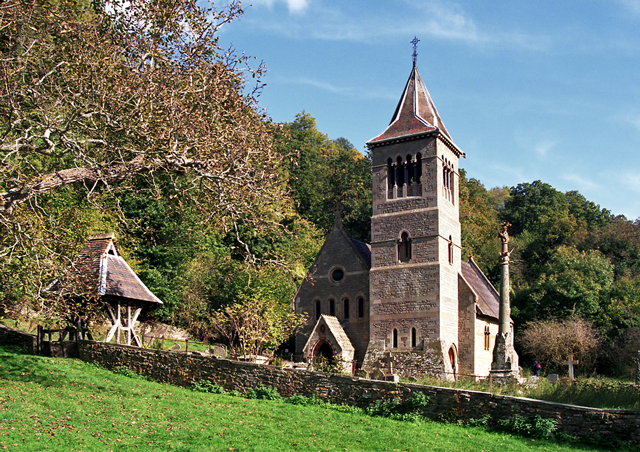
- Welsh Bicknor Church

- Location within Herefordshire
- OS grid reference: SO595175
- Unitary authority: Herefordshire
- Ceremonial county: Herefordshire
- Region: West Midlands
- Country: England
- Sovereign state: United Kingdom
- Post town: Ross-On-Wye
- Postcode district: HR9
- Dialling code: 01594
- Police: West Mercia
- Fire: Hereford and Worcester
- Ambulance: West Midlands
- UK Parliament: Hereford and South Herefordshire

Welsh Bicknor (Welsh: Llangystennin Garth Brenni) is an area in the far south of the county of Herefordshire, England. It lies within a loop of the River Wye and covers 8,502 acres (13.3 sq mi).

The area was historically a detached parish (exclave) of the Welsh county of Monmouthshire. In 1844, it was transferred to the English county of Herefordshire. It is adjacent to English Bicknor and Lydbrook, which are part of Gloucestershire.

== History ==
Courtfield, the manor house of Welsh Bicknor, was originally known as Greyfield or Greenfield (the Welsh colour glas originally referred to a scale of colours including greys, greens and blues). The name was altered after King Henry V of England had lived there as a young child of eight, following the death of his mother Mary de Bohun. He was under the care of Lady Margaret Montacute, wife of Sir John Montacute, 3rd Earl of Salisbury. This was long before his father, King Henry IV, usurped the throne of King Richard II. An effigy of Lady Margaret Montacute can be seen in Welsh Bicknor church, and her plain tomb is beside the altar in Goodrich church.

The manor house and surrounding land of Welsh Bicknor belonged to the Vaughan family. However, in 1651 Richard Vaughan, who was a Catholic, had his land sequestered and given to Phillip Nicholas of Llansoy, in Monmouthshire, leading to the unusual situation of the exclave. However it has been part of Herefordshire since the Counties (Detached Parts) Act 1844.

Religious dissension within the Vaughan families continued for several generations. In 1715, a John Vaughan (presumably one of Richard's descendants) refused the oath of allegiance to George I. He had estates in the counties of Monmouthshire, Radnorshire, Herefordshire, and Gloucestershire valued at £1,000 per annum. In 1719 he was fined for not attending church.

Another family member, Richard Vaughan, joined Prince Charles Edward Stuart's army in 1745. He fought in the Battle of Culloden and followed the Prince into exile. He and his brother William Vaughan were outlawed and their property seized, while they themselves fled to Spain and became officers in the army of that country. Both married Spanish women, and some of their descendants settled in the home of their adoption and became grandees of Spain.

Richard Vaughan died in Barcelona in 1795, but his son William eventually returned to Wales and obtained a restoration of the main portion of his estates, as heir to his uncle. Later, John Vaughan of Courtfield, elder brother of William, took the oath of allegiance to King George III at Monmouth in 1778. Louisa Eliza Rolls, a Catholic convert who married into the recusant Vaughan family when she wed John Vaughan of Courtfield in 1830, prayed that her children might have vocations to priesthood or the religious life, and six of her sons became priests (including the later Cardinal Vaughan) and four of her daughters became nuns.

Welsh Bicknor was historically an exclave of the Welsh county of Monmouthshire, but it was transferred to Herefordshire "for all purposes" by the Counties (Detached Parts) Act 1844 (7 & 8 Vict. c.61), which implemented the list of detached parts set out in Schedule M to the Parliamentary Boundaries Act 1832. This is explicitly confirmed by local scholarly work of the Woolhope Naturalists' Field Club.

== Church and rectory (now a youth hostel) ==
The church of St Margaret, Welsh Bicknor, was extensively rebuilt in 1858, and was sold into private ownership in 2016.

Welsh Bicknor parish records are now held by Hereford Records Office.

There is a Youth Hostel at Welsh Bicknor, next to the church. The building had served as the rectory until it was leased to YHA in 1936. The youth hostel was called 'Welsh Bicknor' for many years but was renamed YHA Wye Valley by the YHA in March 2013. The original hostel replaced the old Kerne Bridge hostel in 1936.

== Former Ross and Monmouth Railway ==
The Ross and Monmouth Railway served the area from Kerne Bridge station across the River Wye. The line passed through with no intermediate station under Coppet Hill using the tunnel, with railway bridges across the Wye to Kerne Bridge in the Ross-on-Wye direction, and Lydbrook Junction in the Monmouth direction.

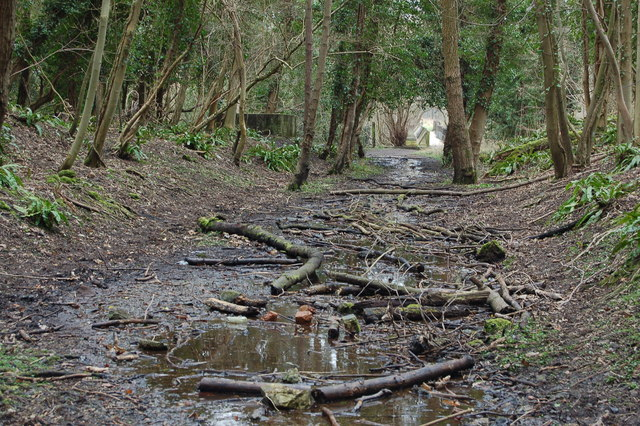
The former Ross and Monmouth Railway trackbed in Welsh Bicknor
