= Kerne Bridge =

Hamlet in Herefordshire, England

Coordinates: 51.86800°N 2.60849°W

- Location within Herefordshire
- OS grid reference: SO582190§
- Civil parish: Walford
- Unitary authority: Herefordshire
- Ceremonial county: Herefordshire
- Region: West Midlands
- Country: England
- Sovereign state: United Kingdom
- Post town: ROSS-ON-WYE
- Postcode district: HR9
- Police: West Mercia
- Fire: Hereford and Worcester
- Ambulance: West Midlands
- UK Parliament: Hereford and South Herefordshire

Kerne Bridge is a hamlet in south Herefordshire, England, about 3.5 miles (6 km) south of the market town of Ross-on-Wye on the B4234 Ross-on-Wye to Coleford road adjacent to Bishopswood. Situated on the left bank of the River Wye, it takes its modern name from the nineteenth century bridge over the river. It was once a significant stop on the now disused and abandoned Monmouth to Ross-on-Wye railway, and is now known for a popular canoe-launching site. It marks the northern start of the Upper Wye Gorge and is situated in the heart of the Wye Valley Area of Outstanding Natural Beauty.

== History ==
The history of the hamlet began when a primitive manually operated mill for grinding corn came to be established there. This type of mill was known in Old English as a cweorn. The presence of the mill gave the name - The Cweorn - to the small settlement which began to be built up around the mill. Over time the spelling of the name of the settlement was simplified to The Quern. Records show that it was still known that way until at least 1815, but by the mid-1820s spelling simplification had further altered its name to The Kerne. It later became known as Kerne Bridge when the bridge over the River Wye was built at the hamlet in 1828.

== Railway ==
In 1873, the Ross and Monmouth Railway line from Ross-on-Wye station to Monmouth Troy was built. It crossed the River Wye at Kerne Bridge on a single-track skew bridge constructed of plate girders. The single-track bridge was built by Edward Finch of Chepstow and was 133 metres (436 ft) long. Kerne Bridge railway station was the first initially station after leaving Ross-on-Wye, though Walford Halt at Walford was built later between them. The station closed in 1959 when passenger service on the line was withdrawn. Goods services continued to run until 1964, when the bridge was demolished, leaving the masonry abutments. Nearby is a picnic place and canoe launch site based at the site of the bridge.

The station building, after many years as an outdoor activity centre, is now a private house. On the other side of the river is Flanesford Priory which is now holiday accommodation.

== Governance ==
Due to its location in the geographical centre Kerne Bridge is the name of a local government ward of Herefordshire Council. Kerne Bridge Ward contains five parishes, they are: Walford, Goodrich, Whitchurch, Welsh Bicknor and Ganarew.
