= Walford, Ross-on-Wye =

Village in Herefordshire, England

Coordinates: 51.8806°N 2.6014°W

Walford
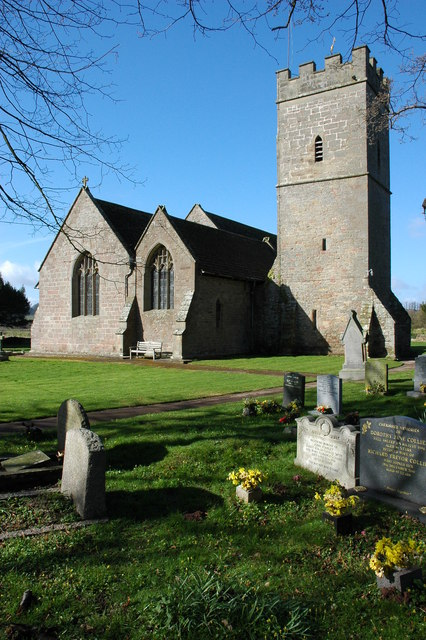
- St Michael's & All Angels Church, Walford

- Location within Herefordshire
- Population: 1,504 (2011)
- OS grid reference: SO587204
- Unitary authority: Herefordshire
- Ceremonial county: Herefordshire
- Region: West Midlands
- Country: England
- Sovereign state: United Kingdom
- Post town: Ross-on-Wye
- Postcode district: HR9
- Police: West Mercia
- Fire: Hereford and Worcester
- Ambulance: West Midlands

Walford is a village and civil parish in south Herefordshire, England, two miles south of the market town of Ross-on-Wye. It includes the settlements of Bishopswood, Coughton, Deep Dean, Hom Green and Walford.

The two Church of England churches in the parish, All Saints at Bishopswood and St Michael & All Angels at Walford, lie in different benefices. The centre of the nave of Walford church was constructed around 1100 making it one of the earliest churches to be built in Herefordshire. Bishopswood Church is far more recent being endowed in 1841.

The B4324 Ross-on-Wye to Coleford road runs through the village.

The River Wye forms the western boundary of the parish. Kerne Bridge allows the B4229 road to cross the river to Goodrich.

Walford Court was the headquarters of Col John Birch during the siege of Goodrich Castle in the English Civil War.

In Hom Green is Hill Court Manor, a country house built in 1700, now a Grade I listed building and the closed Church of the Paraclete. The Grade II listed church was built in 1905–06 to designs by George Frederick Bodley in memory of Major Lionel James Trafford.

Walford is sometimes confused with another Walford in the north of the county.

Walford has a village hall and a primary school.

== Railways ==
The Ross and Monmouth Railway went through the village between Ross-on-Wye railway station and Monmouth Troy railway station from 1873/4. Eventually Walford Halt railway station was opened. It was opened by the Great Western Railway on 23 February 1931 and consisted of 120 ft platform and a small hut on the east side of the line. It was unstaffed and had no freight facilities or sidings. The staff of Kerne Bridge station lit the platform lights and cleaned the stop, though its traffic receipts were counted with Ross-on-Wye's.

The halt closed on 5 January 1959 when the Ross and Monmouth Railway was closed to passengers. The track was still used from Ross-on-Wye to Lydbrook until 1965 as a private siding to serve a cable works.
