= Wye Valley Walk =

Long-distance footpath in Wales and England

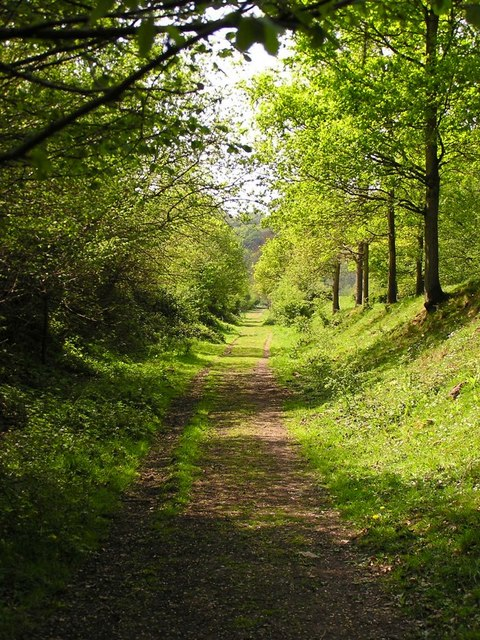
- Part of the Wye Valley Walk following the former Lydbrook Junction to Monmouth Railway
- Length: 219 km (136 mi)
- Designation: Long-distance trail
- Trailheads: Chepstow; Plynlimon
- Use: Hiking
- Highest point: Plynlimon, 752 m (2,467 ft)
- Season: All year

The Wye Valley Walk (Welsh: Llwybr Dyffryn Gwy) is a long distance footpath in Wales and England following the course of the River Wye.

== History ==
In 1975 the Wye Valley Walk opened with a 14-mile (23 km) stretch between St. Arvans and Monmouth. Further stretches were added, leading to it becoming a 34-mile (55 km) footpath by 1981. During the 1980s, gaps between Ross-on-Wye, Hay-on-Wye and Rhayader were integrated into the pathway, forming a 112-mile (180 km) walk reaching from near the river's mouth at Chepstow in Monmouthshire, to Rhayader in Mid Wales.

In September 2002, the route was finally extended to start or finish in Coed Hafren, having passed within viewing distance of the source of the River Wye on Plynlimon near Aberystwyth, a total of 136 miles (219 km).

== The route ==
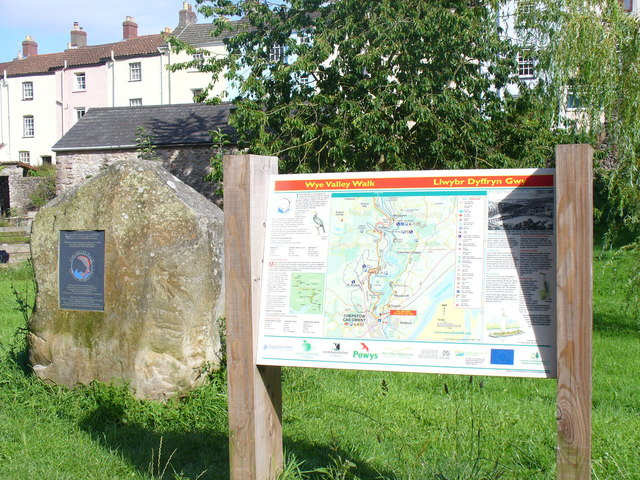
The southern end of the path, near Chepstow Castle

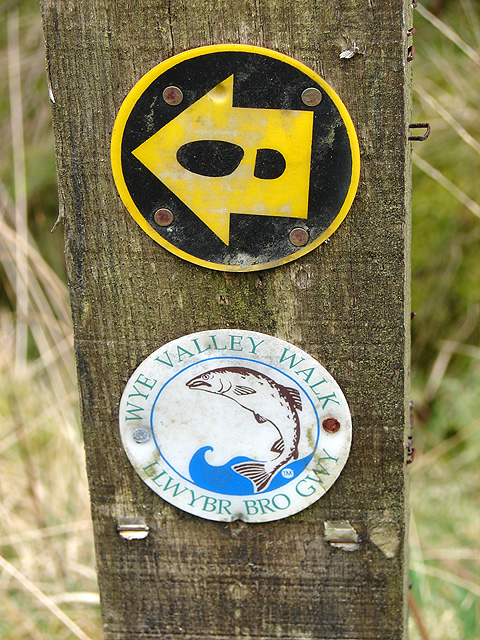
Waymark signs on the path

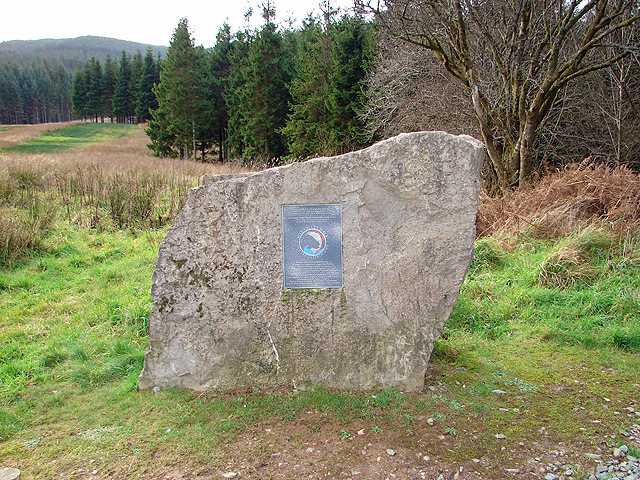
The northern end of the path

The Wye Valley Walk is marked out by circular yellow waymark arrows, finger posts, and signs showing the path's logo, a leaping salmon. Most of the route follows Public Rights of Way. Some parts are permissive paths where owners have agreed for them to be used. Parts of Plynlimon are open countryside in which there is a right to roam established by the Countryside and Rights of Way Act 2000.

The route passes through Chepstow, the Wye Valley AONB, Tintern, Monmouth, Ross-on-Wye, Symonds Yat, Hereford, Hay-on-Wye, Builth Wells, Rhayader, and Llangurig to Plynlimon.

The route of the Wye Valley Walk can be broken into 17 stages, though the entire walk is often walked in seven day-length sections from Chepstow to Plynlimon, or vice versa.

=== Days and sections ===
Days and sections* described in the text The Wye Valley Walk, and The Wye Valley Walk website, both by The Wye Valley Partnership.

==== Day 1 ====
- Section 1: Chepstow Castle to Tintern Abbey – 6 miles (10 km)
- Section 2: Tintern Abbey to Monmouth – 10 miles (16 km)

==== Day 2 ====
- Section 1: Monmouth to Symonds Yat – 6 miles (10 km)
- Section 2: Symonds Yat to Kerne Bridge – 8 miles (13 km)
- Section 3: Kerne Bridge to Ross-on-Wye – 6 miles (10 km)

==== Day 3 ====
- Section 1: Ross-on-Wye to Fownhope – 11 miles (18 km)
- Section 2: Fownhope to Hereford – 7 miles (11 km)

==== Day 4 ====
- Section 1: Hereford to Byford – 10 miles (16 km)
- Section 2: Byford to Bredwardine – 5 miles (8 km)
- Section 3: Bredwardine to Hay-on-Wye – 9 miles (14 km)

==== Day 5 ====
- Section 1: Hay-on-Wye to Glasbury – 5 miles (8 km)
- Section 2: Glasbury to Erwood – 9 miles (14 km)
- Section 3: Erwood to Builth Wells – 7 miles (11 km)

==== Day 6 ====
- Section 1: Builth Wells to Newbridge-on-Wye – 7 miles (11 km)
- Section 2: Newbridge-on-Wye to Rhayader – 10 miles (16 km)

==== Day 7 ====
- Section 1: Rhayader to Llangurig – 12 miles (19 km)
- Section 2: Llangurig to Rhyd-y-benwch (Plynlimon) – 12 miles (19 km)

_{*miles and km rounded to whole numbers}

== Landmarks ==
The Wye Valley Walk passes the following notable landmarks:

- Chepstow Castle
- Tintern Abbey
- Goodrich Castle
- Capler Camp

== Rail access ==
The following stations have services provided by Transport for Wales which can be used to connect with the Wye Valley Walk:

- Chepstow railway station
- Hereford railway station
- Builth Road railway station
