= Symonds Yat =

Village in Gloucestershire and Herefordshire, England

Coordinates: 51.845°N 2.646°W

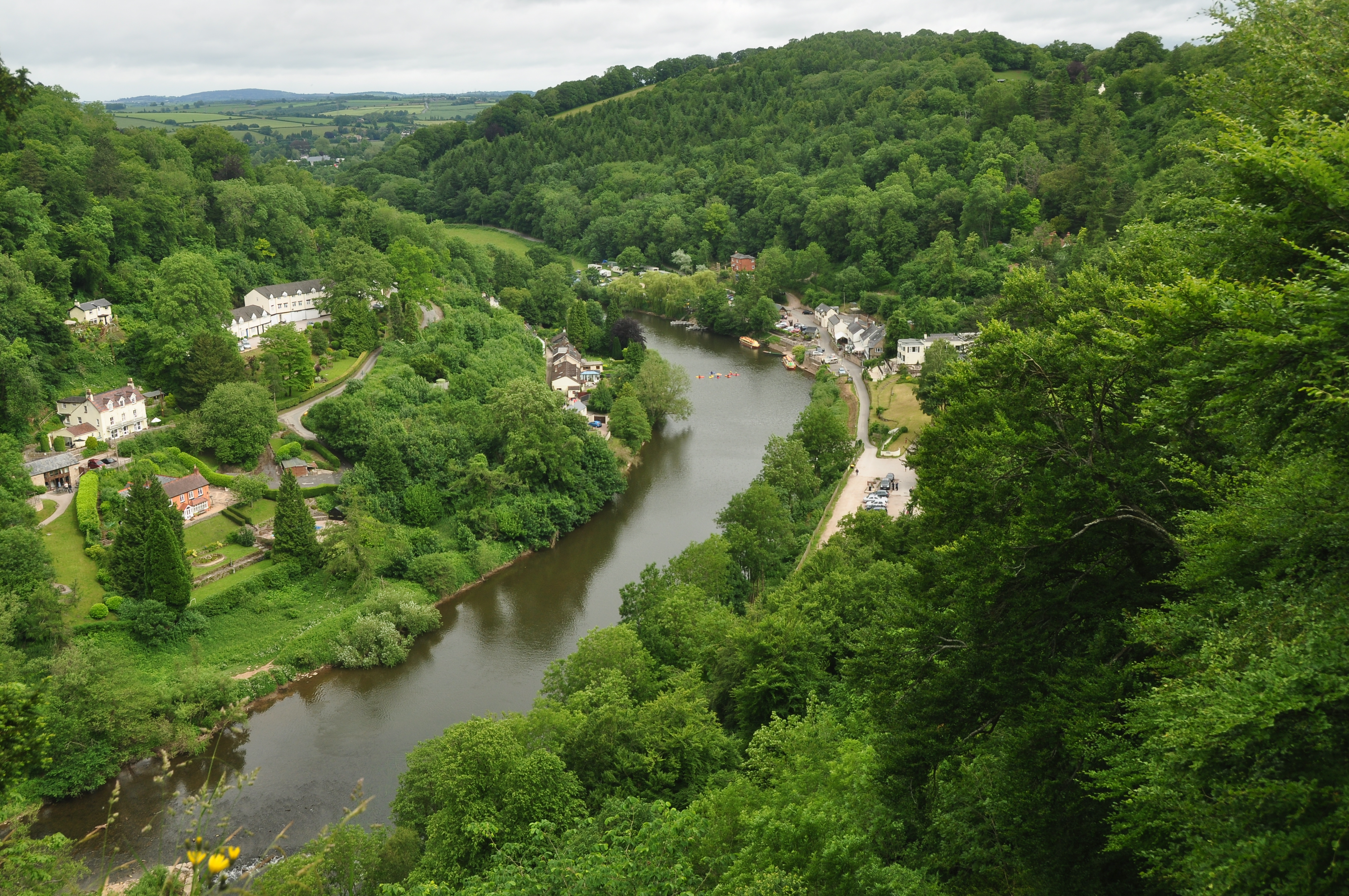

- Location within the UK Location in Herefordshire Location within Gloucestershire
- OS grid reference: SO558168
- Civil parish: Goodrich (Symonds Yat West & East); Whitchurch (Symonds Yat West); English Bicknor (Symonds Yat East)
- District: Forest of Dean
- Unitary authority: Herefordshire
- Shire county: Gloucestershire; Herefordshire
- Ceremonial county: Gloucestershire; Herefordshire
- Region: South West; West Midlands
- Country: England
- Sovereign state: United Kingdom
- Post town: ROSS-ON-WYE
- Postcode district: HR9
- Post town: COLEFORD
- Postcode district: GL16
- Dialling code: 01600; 01594
- Police: Gloucestershire
- West Mercia
- Fire: Gloucestershire
- Hereford and Worcester
- Ambulance: South Western
- West Midlands
- UK Parliament: Hereford and South Herefordshire; Forest of Dean

Symonds Yat is a village in the Wye Valley in the English counties of Herefordshire and Gloucestershire, and a popular tourist destination. It straddles the River Wye, and is within a few miles of Monmouthshire and the Welsh border.

The two settlements either side of the river are known as Symonds Yat West and Symonds Yat East and are linked by a footbridge and passenger ferries. Nearby is Symonds Yat Rock, a scenic hilltop viewpoint. The Seven Sisters Rocks are an outcrop of rocks forming cliffs above the Wye at Symonds Yat.

== Toponym ==
The first recorded use of Symonds Yat in connection with the area is in a Patent Roll of 1256, where the place appears as Symundesyate and Symondesyate. This may contain the Old English personal name Sigemund, or a very early surname deriving from it. Yat represents the Old English word geat (pronounced "yat"), meaning 'gate' and describing the gorge. Thus overall, a familiar cognate translation of the name might be reconstructed *Sigmund's Gate. Although a popular local belief, it is not true that the addition of Symonds was made in the 17th century in reference to Robert Symonds of Sugwas and Evesfield, High Sheriff of Herefordshire in 1685, who was indeed a member of the family who owned the lands from Wormelow near Hereford to the border regions in which surround the Yat. The area is also shown as Symons Yate on maps in 1665, Symons Yat in 1717 and Symmonds Gate in 1830.

== History ==
Bones from hyenas, sabre-toothed cats and a mammoth have been found in and around the caves of the Wye valley. Human habitation can be traced back to 12,000 years ago with findings of their tools and clothes.

In the Iron Age the forts on the Great Doward and Yat Rock provided secure, defensible settlements for the local residents. During Roman times these forts became focal points in the region and the importance of the iron here and in the Forest of Dean made this a valuable prize for the conquerors. The 8th-century earthwork Offa's Dyke runs close to Symonds Yat.

The Yat Gorge was mined for iron ore and remains of a smelting works are located down stream of the Symonds Yat Rapids. The ironworks at New Weir date from the 1590s and were operated by the White family until 1753, when George White leased the site to John Partridge, an ironmonger from Ross on Wye. Partridge combined the ironworks at New Weir with his forge at Lydbrook which smelted pig iron from his furnace at Bishopswood. The works closed when the lease ran out in 1798 and the adjacent weir and lock buildings were demolished and the lock filled in 1814.

The Old Court Hotel in Symonds Yat West, which was built in the 16th century, was the ancestral home of the Gwillim family and was home to John Graves Simcoe, who was governor and one of the founding fathers of Upper Canada.

The ferry at Symonds Yat has always played a huge part in the life here. In 1800 there were 25 hand ferries between Ross and Chepstow just like those outside Ye Old Ferrie Inn and the Saracen's Head today. They were introduced in Roman times to link the forts of the Doward and the Yat and have served military, civilian, tourist and horse traffic over the years.

Symonds Yat originally encompassed all the lands south of Huntsham curve on both sides of Symonds Yat Rock and would have included the area around Coldwell Rocks. The name Symonds Yat used to refer to quite a large area of land and the hamlet of Symonds Yat East, consisting of the Saracen's Head Inn, the Fish House, Lockkeepers Cottage and one or two cottages on the hillside, was specifically called New Weir and is seen on maps as such up until 1955.

In April 2009 Herefordshire Archaeology excavated New Weir Iron Works at Symonds Yat West to establish how the iron works functioned between the start of smelting in and the decline of the works in the 1800s. It was found that the works included a 'slitting mill', for making wire nails and a rolling mill powered by water wheels.

== Symonds Yat East ==
Symonds Yat East is on the eastern side of the river. It has three hotels, WyeDean Canoe and Activity Centre and the Saracens Head Inn (with accommodation). A steep footpath leads from the village up to Symonds Yat Rock. Another footpath and a cycleway, constructed on a former railway line, runs on the eastern bank to Monmouth.

== Symonds Yat West ==
Symonds Yat West is on the western side of the river and has a large caravan and camping site. Visitor attractions include the "Amazing Hedge Puzzle" maze built in 1977 to commemorate the Silver Jubilee of Queen Elizabeth II, and the Wye Valley Butterfly Zoo. The main village is Whitchurch with a village shop, The Crown pub and The Potting Shed restaurant, which is in a large 1850s reading room with vaulted ceiling. This was built by Lucy Panter, whose sister Amelia commissioned the, now Grade II listed, clock tower in 1867 of red brick with a hipped pyramidal slate roof.

== River crossings ==
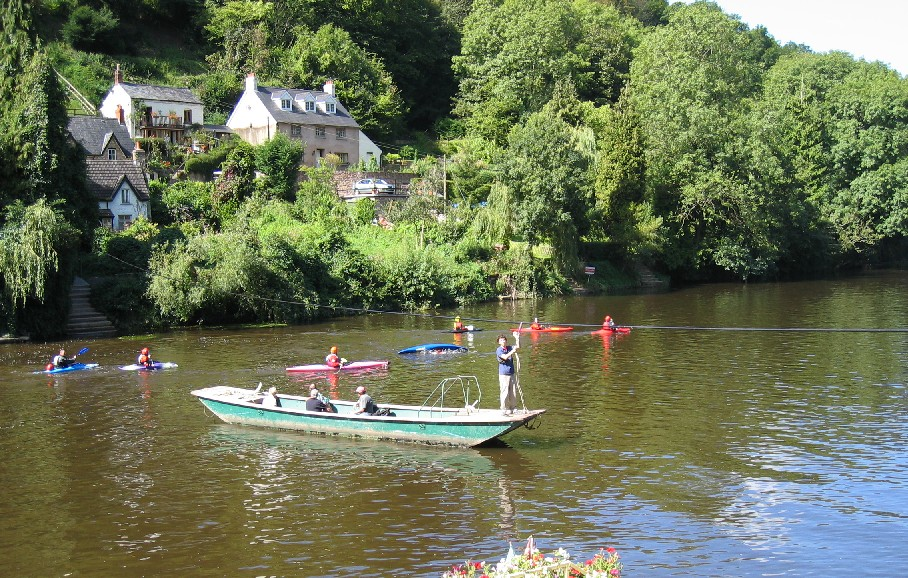
Hand-pulled ferry over the River Wye at Symonds Yat

Two hand ("pull") cable ferries enable foot passengers to cross the river, powered by ferrymen who pull the ferry across the river using an overhead cable. The only connection by road is upstream over Huntsham bridge; this is a five-mile trip. One ferry is operated by the Saracens Head Inn and the other by the Ye Old Ferrie Inn.

A suspension bridge, Biblins Bridge, was built over the river by the Forestry Commission using local oak timbers in 1957. Linking Symonds Yat East to the Biblins camp site, the bridge was fully refurbished in 1997 and rotten timbers and the two support towers were replaced. Although it is designed to take up to 30 people, it has signs requesting that no more than 6 cross at a time.

== Geographical features ==
=== Symonds Yat Rock ===
Symonds Yat Rock overlooks a scenic gorge through which the River Wye snakes. This rock is a popular viewpoint from which to watch raptors: a pair of peregrine falcons that nest annually within sight of the rock can be watched through telescopes set up by the RSPB. Buzzards, goshawks and hobbies are also regularly seen and it is sometimes possible to see migrant raptors such as ospreys and European honey buzzards.

=== Seven Sisters Rocks ===
The Seven Sisters Rocks are an outcrop of rocks forming cliffs above the Wye, between Symonds Yat and Monmouth.

== Local activities ==
Tourist activities include boat trips, a maze, stand-up paddle boarding (from Ye Old Ferrie Inn), an oriental garden, and a number of country pubs and guest houses.

Symonds Yat Rapids are a grade 2 man-made feature at Symonds Yat used by canoeists and kayakers for whitewater training and playboating.

There is extensive and popular rock climbing on the cliff faces of Carboniferous limestone, with long single pitches at all grades.

== Railways ==
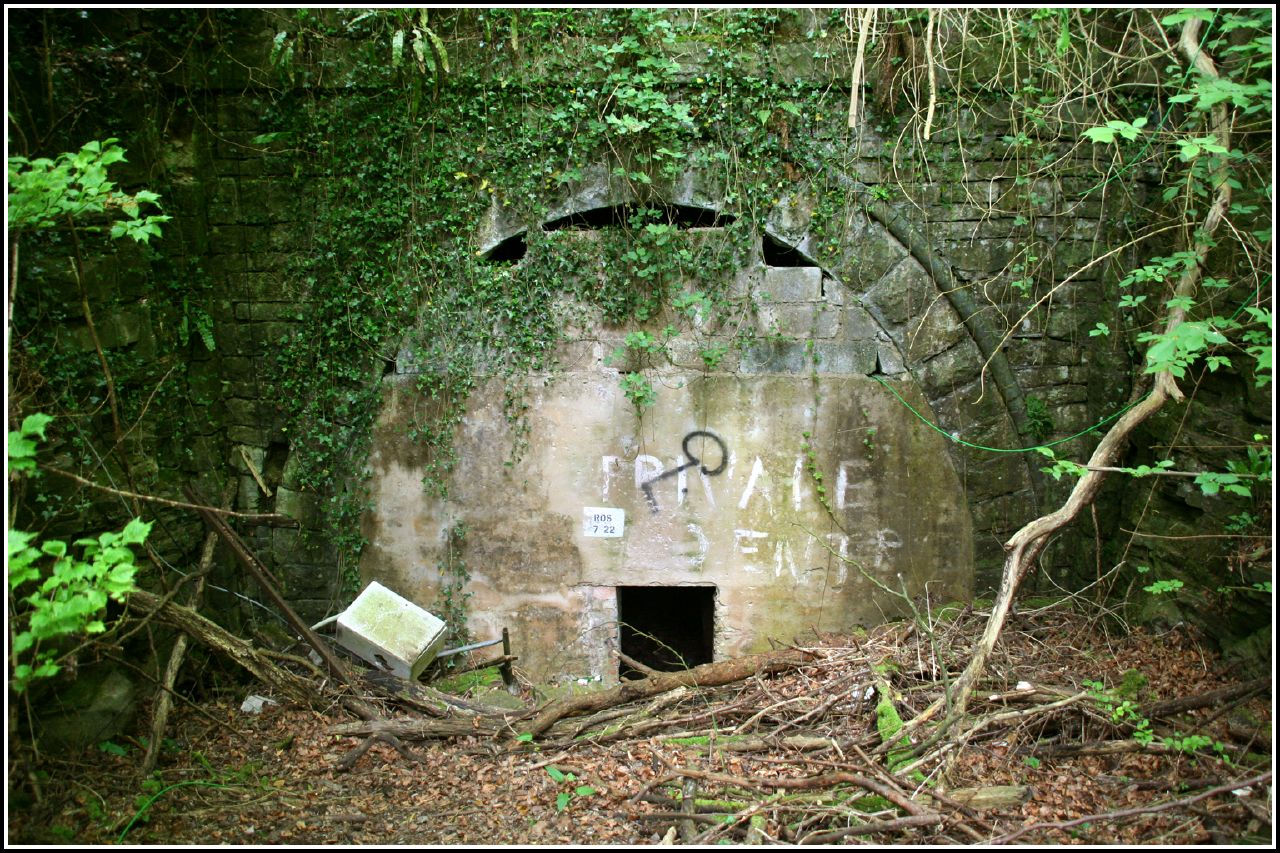
Old railway tunnel at Symonds Yat

Symonds Yat station, on the east side of the river, was on the Ross and Monmouth Railway that ran from Ross-on-Wye to Monmouth Troy between 1873 and 1959 through the Wye Valley. A trace of this remains at Symonds Yat Tunnel.

== Media ==
- A scene from the 1993 film Shadowlands was filmed at Symonds Yat Rock, with the view of the Wye Valley in the background, but it was meant to be another location within the plot of the film.
- Symonds Yat featured on the 2005 TV programme Seven Natural Wonders as one of the wonders of the West Country.
- Symonds Yat Rock was used as a location for some episodes of Series 5 of the BBC television drama Merlin.
- Symonds Yat was used as a location for some of the shots filmed in Harry Potter and the Deathly Hallows – Part 1
- The Saracens Head Inn in the hamlet of Symonds Yat East was featured in Escape to the Country on BBC One in 2014.
- A chalet in Symonds Yat East featured as the family home for main character Otis in the 2019 Netflix Original series Sex Education.

== Gallery ==
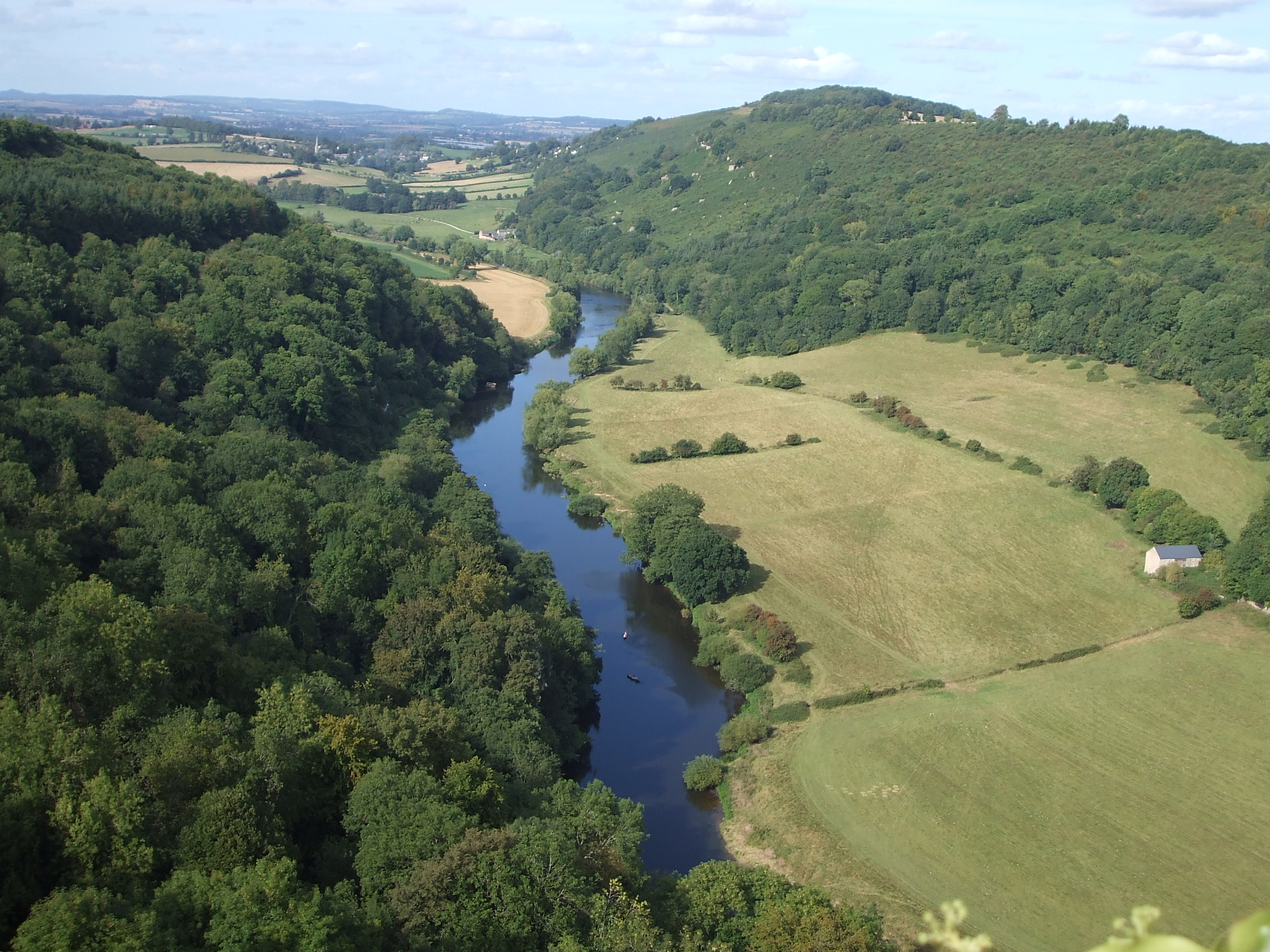
View of the Wye valley from Symonds Yat Rock

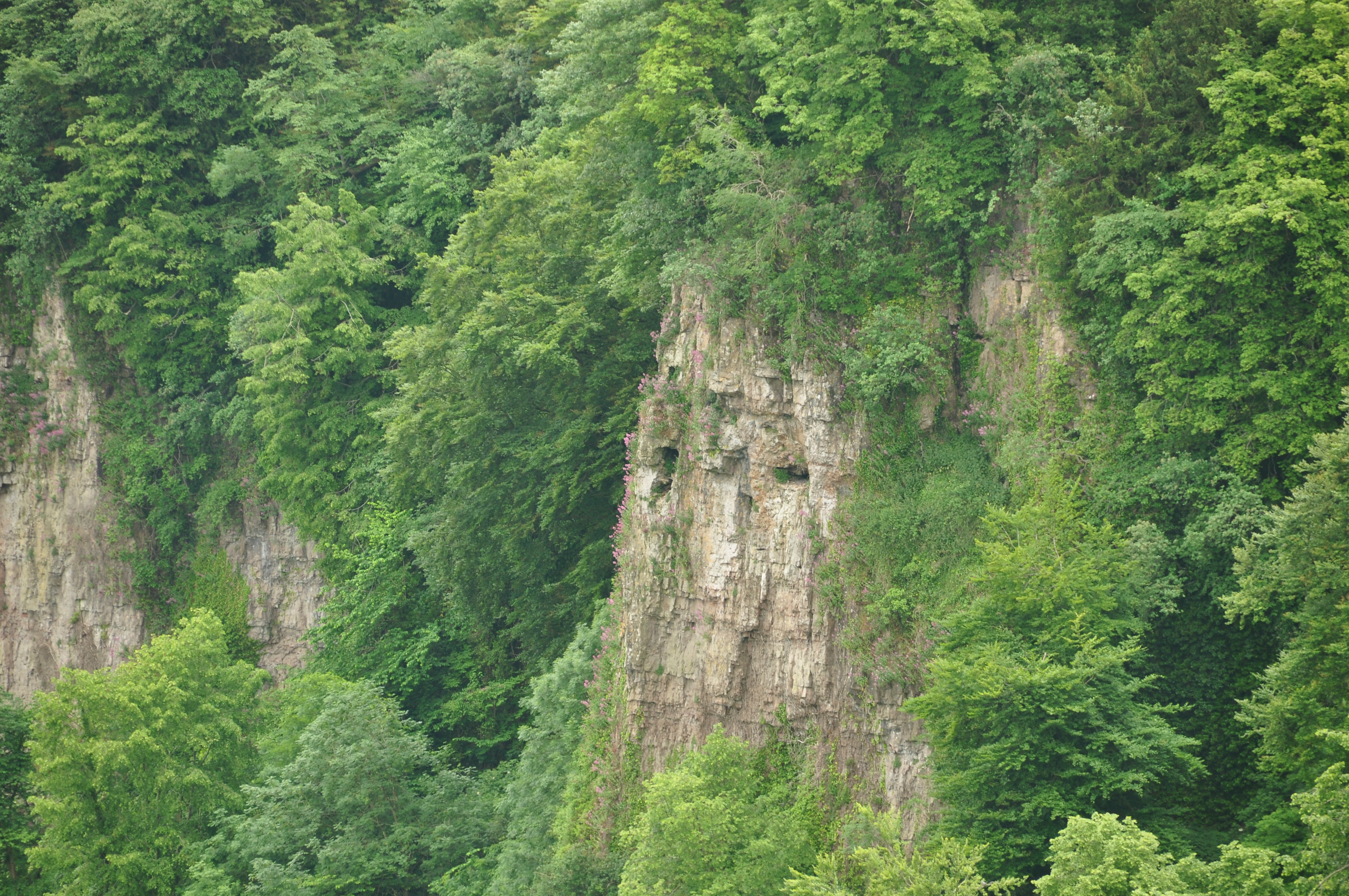
Peregrine falcons at Symonds Yat

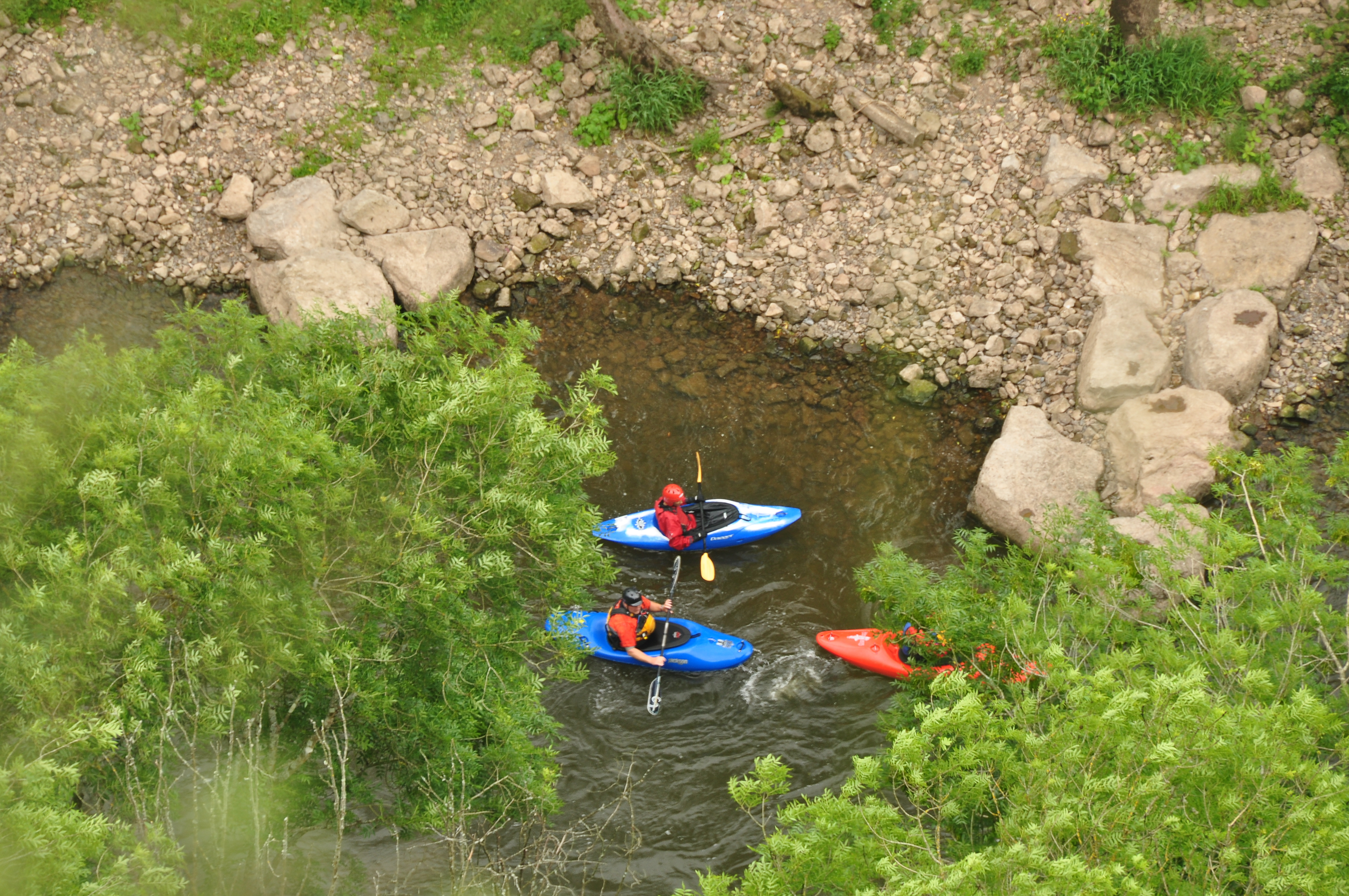
Kayaking at Symonds Yat

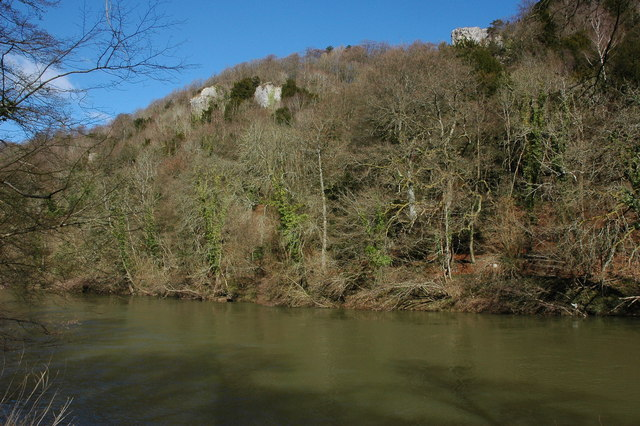
Seven Sisters Rocks, Wye Valley
