= Monmouth railway station =

Monmouth railway station may refer to two former stations in Monmouth, Wales:

- Monmouth Troy railway station
- Monmouth Mayhill railway station
