= Coppet Hill =

Nature reserve in Herefordshire, England

Coordinates: 51.858°N 2.620°W

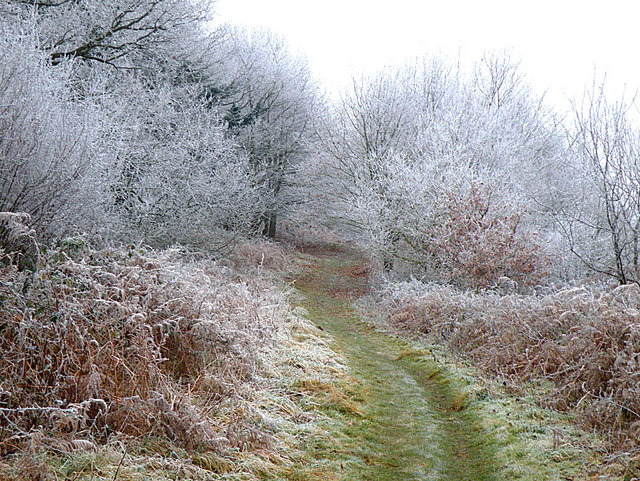
Footpath on Coppet Hill

Coppet Hill or Coppett Hill is a local nature reserve in the parish of Goodrich near Ross-on-Wye in Herefordshire.

== Nature reserve ==
It earned local nature reserve status in 2000 after 15 years of conservation management. It is owned by Trustees who live in the parish and conservation work is supported by the Friends of Coppett Hill. It is a mix of woodland and open hillside and a good site for butterflies, deer, birdlife and fungi.

== Access ==
Permissive paths give access to the reserve as well as offering views stretching from the Brecon Beacons and Black Mountains to the Clee Hills in Shropshire and the Malvern Hills in Worcestershire. The reserve is within the Wye Valley Area of Outstanding Natural Beauty.

Coppett Hill is easily accessed from the A40 between Ross-on-Wye and Monmouth. There is no parking on Coppett Hill and access is on foot only

There are many other walks around the area. Coppett Hill is skirted by the Wye Valley Walk.

== Coppet Hill Tunnel ==
Sometimes referred to as Lydbrook Tunnel. It opened in 1873, along with the Ross and Monmouth Railway, allowing passage from Lydbrook Junction to Kerne Bridge.

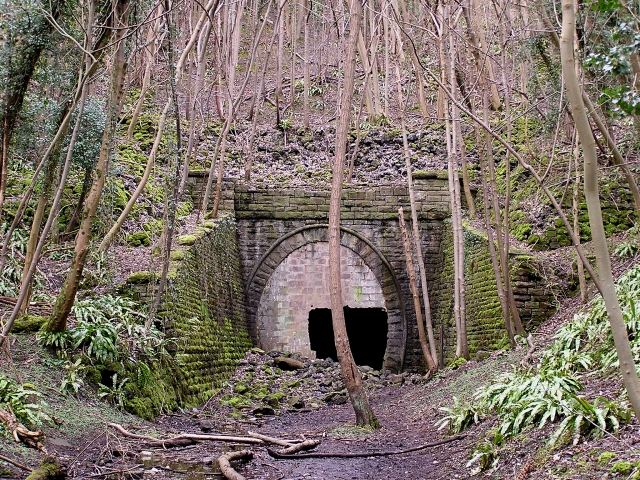
Coppett Hill Tunnel near Lydbrook Junction railway station on the Ross and Monmouth Railway.
