= Hadnock Halt railway station =

Former railway station in Monmouthshire, Wales

Coordinates: 51.8303°N 2.6850°W

Hadnock Halt
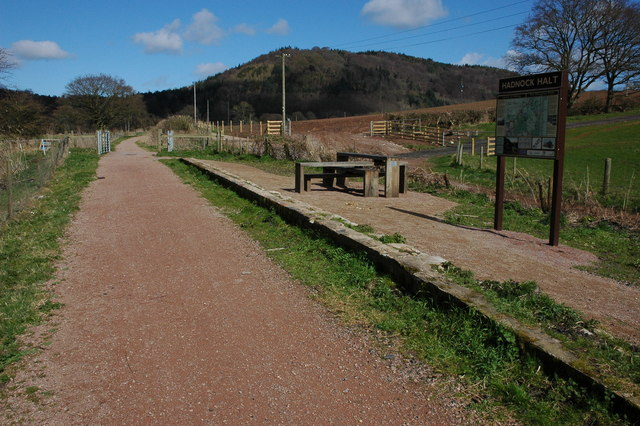
- The site of Hadnock Halt in 2008

General information
- Location: Dixton, Monmouthshire; Wales
- Grid reference: SO529149
- Platforms: 1

Other information
- Status: Disused

History
- Post-grouping: British Railways

Key dates
- 7 May 1951: Opened
- 5 January 1959: Closed
Location

Hadnock Halt railway station is a disused railway station on the Ross and Monmouth Railway which was only open for eight years, 1951 to 1959, closing when passenger services were withdrawn from the line. The platform still exists and the trackbed is part of a cycleway.

Preceding station	Disused railways	Following station
Monmouth Mayhill	Ross and Monmouth Railway; British Railways	Symonds Yat
