= Symonds Yat Rapids =

Rapids on the River Wye in England

Coordinates: 51.837755°N 2.639928°W

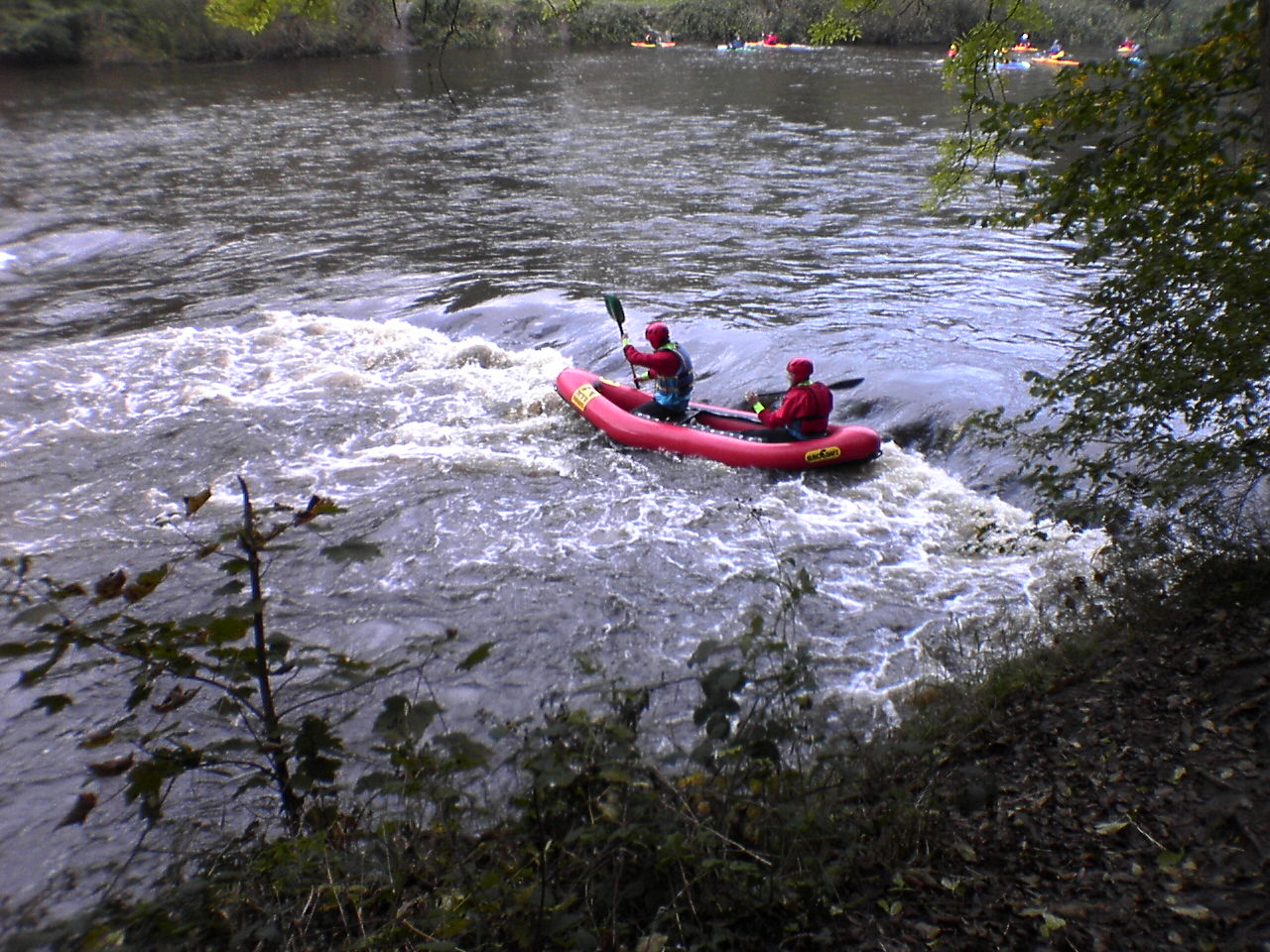
Top wave

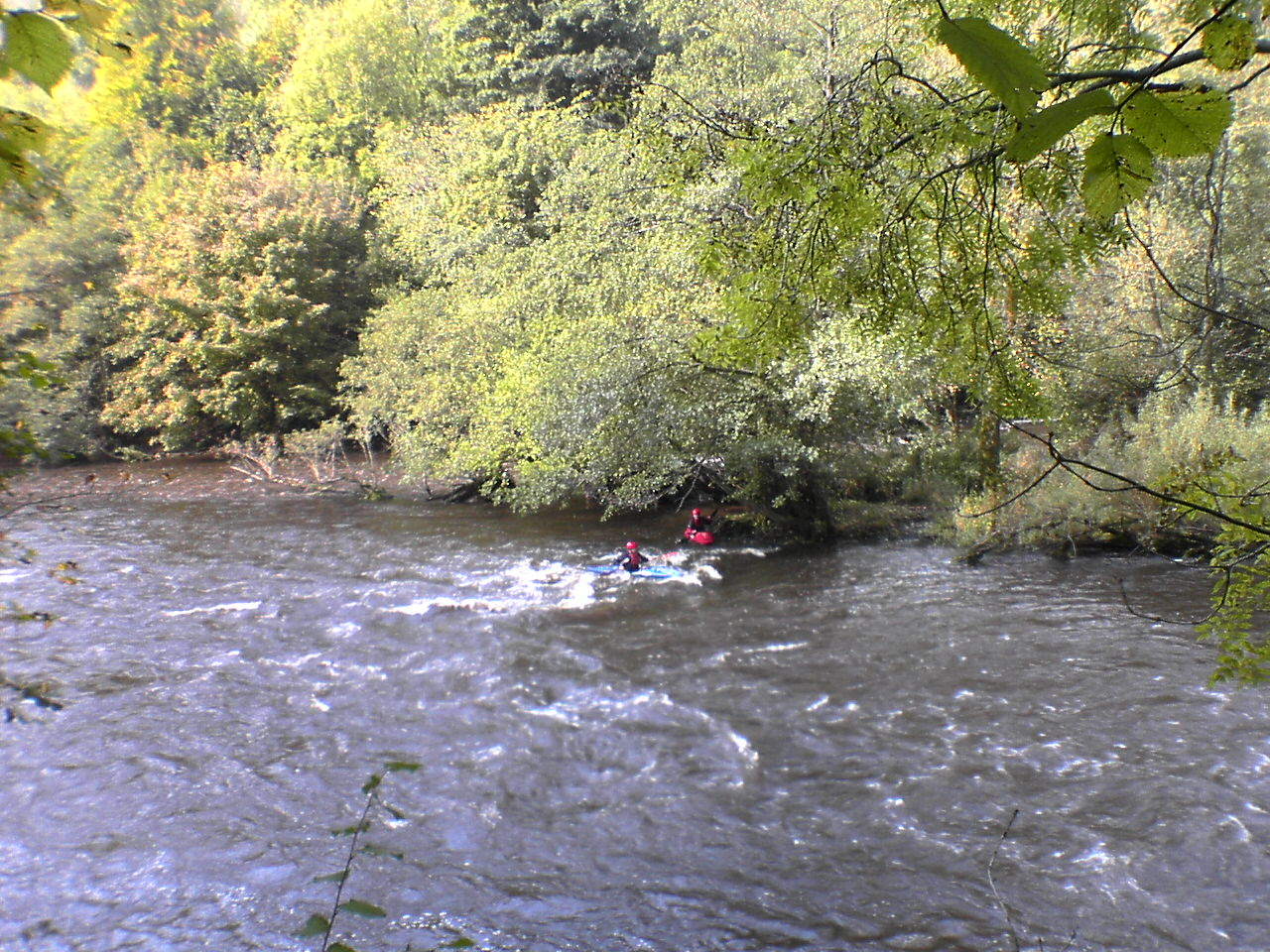
Bottom wave

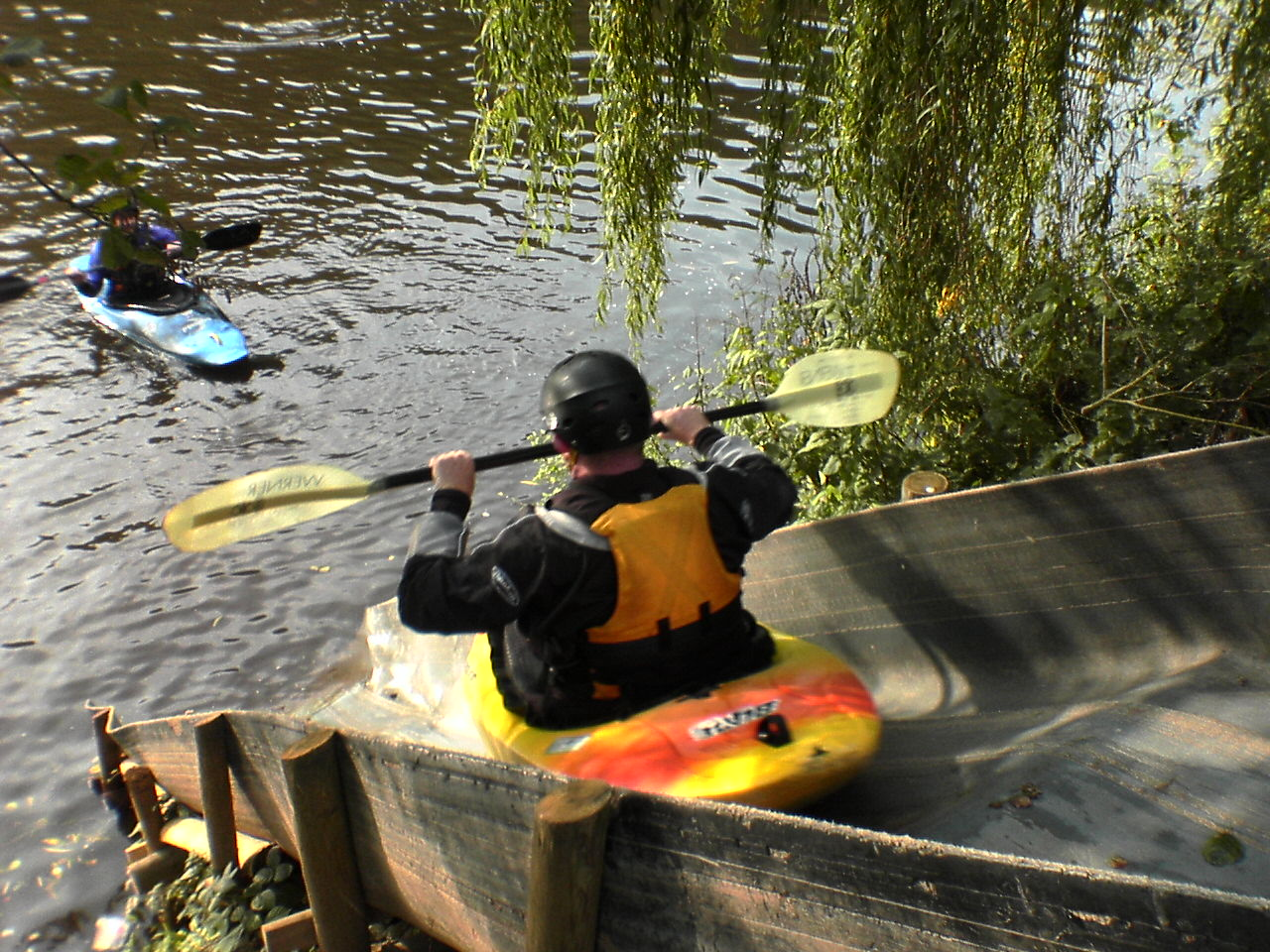
Seal launch

Symonds Yat Rapids are a grade-2 man-made feature on the River Wye, near Symonds Yat on the Gloucestershire and Herefordshire border. They are most commonly used by canoeists and kayakers for whitewater training and playboating.

== Construction ==
Man-made rock walls have been installed to modify the flow of the river on river right, and provide waves and eddies.

== Ownership and access ==
The British Canoe Union (now called Paddle UK) purchased the banks to the river in 2003 allowing year-round access.

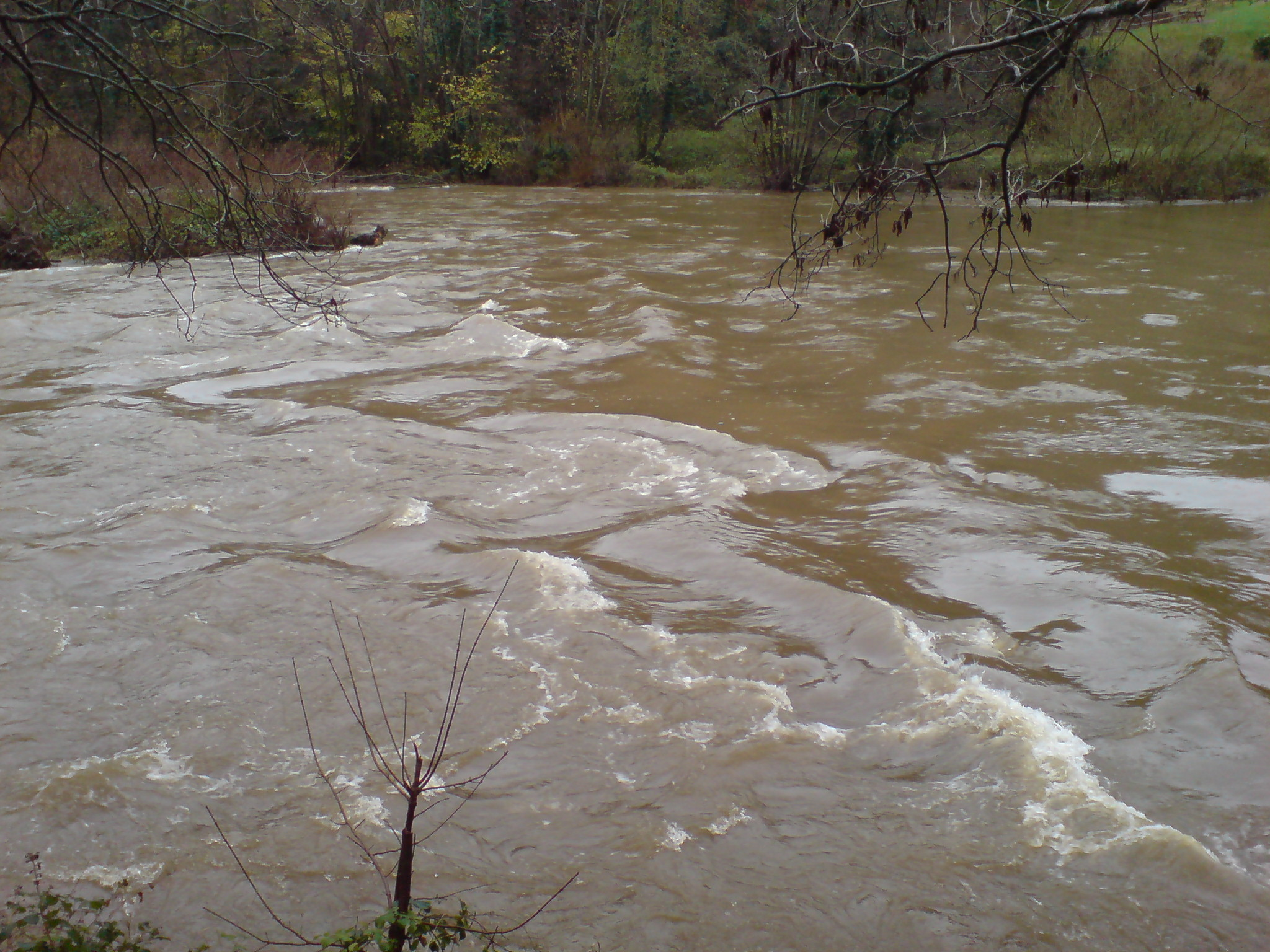
The rapids when flooded

Typically the mid-autumn and mid-spring periods provide the best levels. After very heavy rain the features will wash out leaving nothing more than fast-flowing water.

== See also ==
- River running
- River Severn
