= Symonds Yat railway station =

Former railway station in Herefordshire, England

Symonds Yat
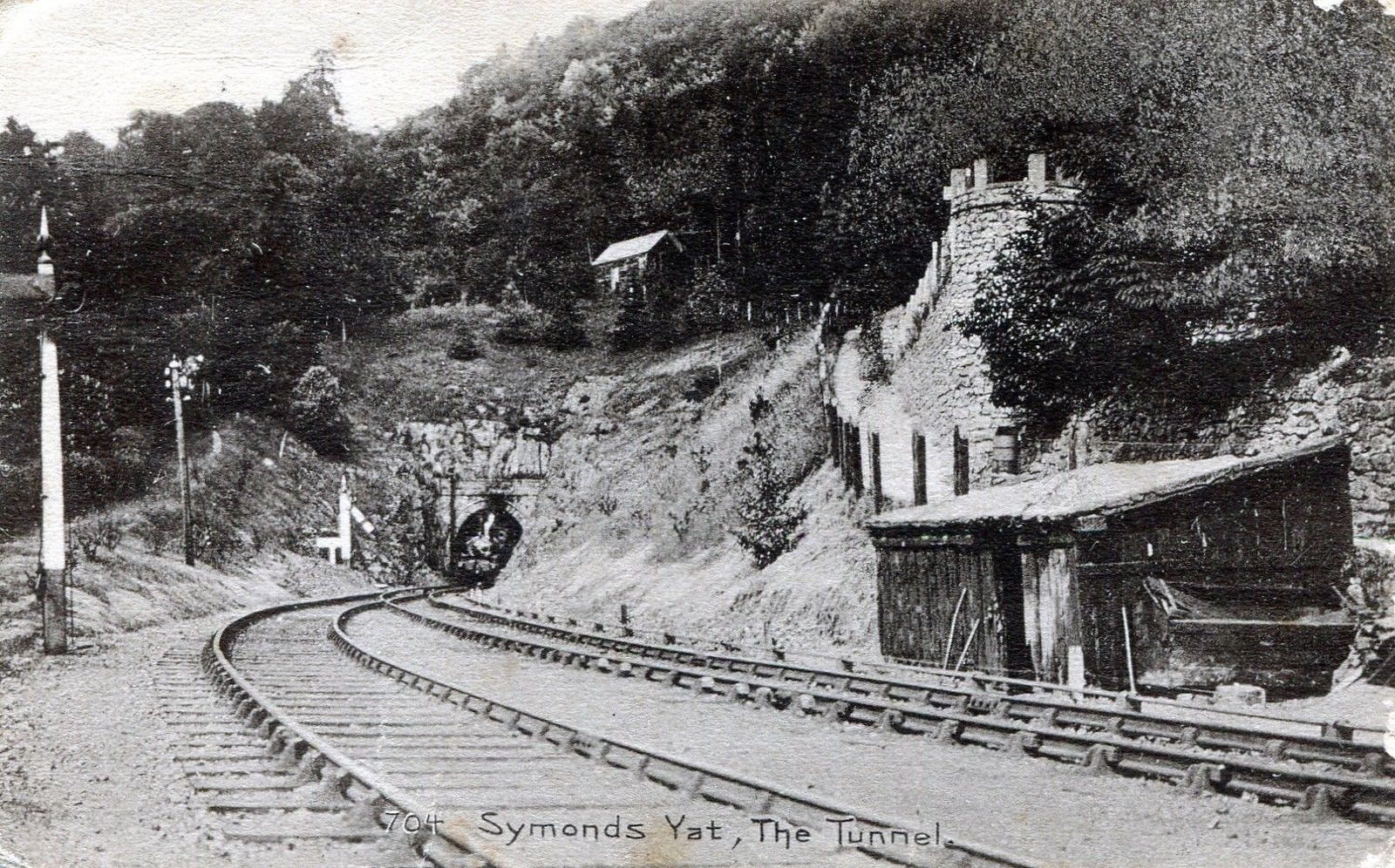
- Symonds Yat Tunnel with train emerging 1895

General information
- Location: Symonds Yat, Herefordshire; England
- Coordinates: 51.8384°N 2.6387°W
- Grid reference: SO561157
- Platforms: 2

Other information
- Status: Disused

History
- Pre-grouping: Ross and Monmouth Railway
- Post-grouping: Great Western Railway

Key dates
- 4 August 1873: Opened
- 5 January 1959: Closed
Location

Symonds Yat railway station is a disused railway station on the Ross and Monmouth Railway constructed on the banks of the River Wye in Symonds Yat East.

Opened in 1873, it consisted of two platforms and a timber station building on the down platform, it closed in 1959 with the closure of the line. The railways were at first used as a quick means of bringing the boats back from Chepstow.

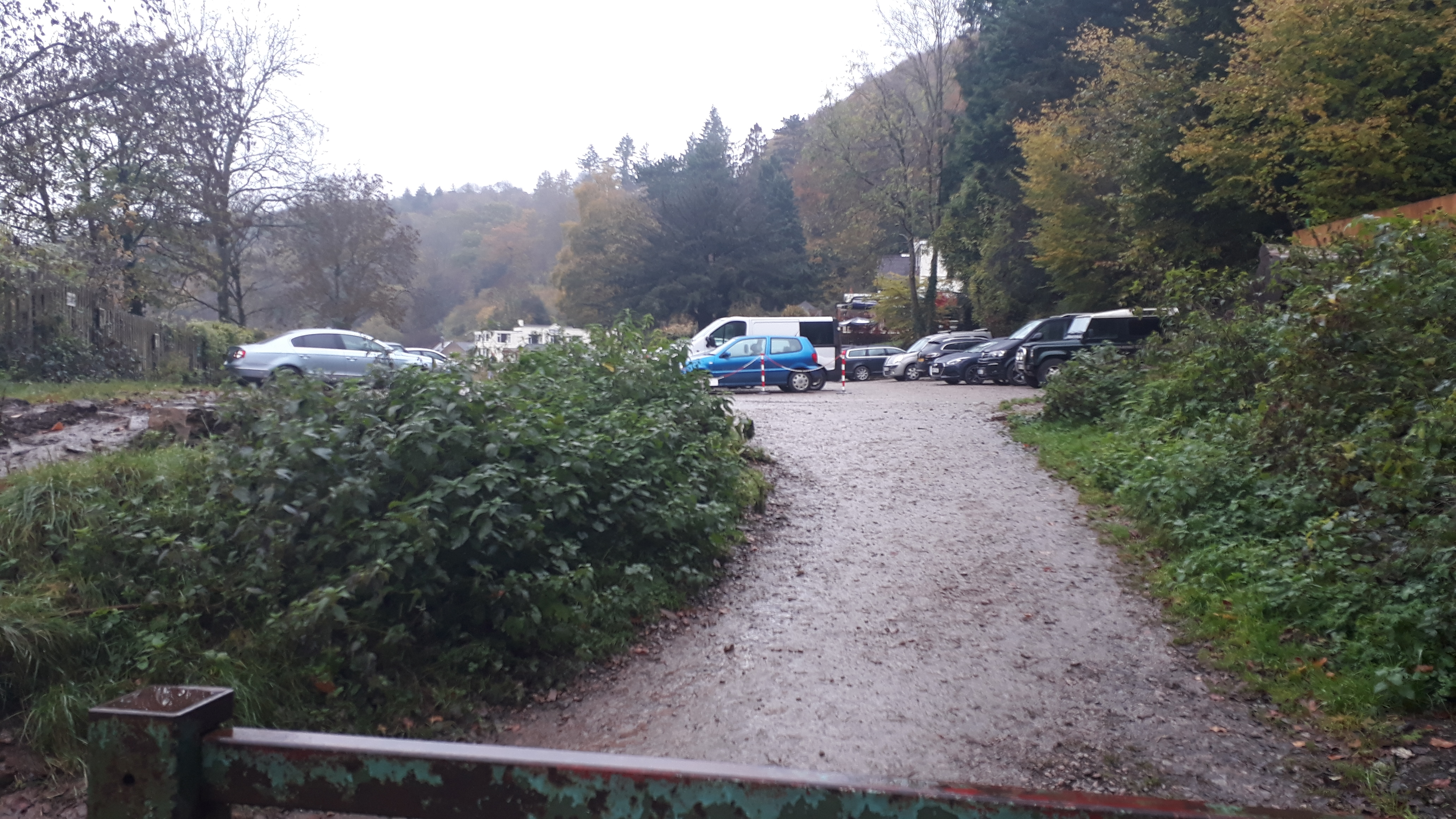
Symonds Yat station site, now buried under a car park

A camping coach was positioned here by the Western Region from 1953 to 1958; an early form of self-catering accommodation which used converted redundant railway carriages for occupation by holidaymakers who could arrive and depart by train. Today the station site has long been levelled but the foundations of the station building and platforms remain and the area now forms a car parking area for a local hotel inn.

Preceding station	Disused railways	Following station
Hadnock Halt	Ross and Monmouth Railway; British Railways	Lydbrook Junction
