= Monmouth Mayhill railway station =

Former railway station in Monmouthshire, Wales

Coordinates: 51.8118°N 2.7075°W

Monmouth Mayhill
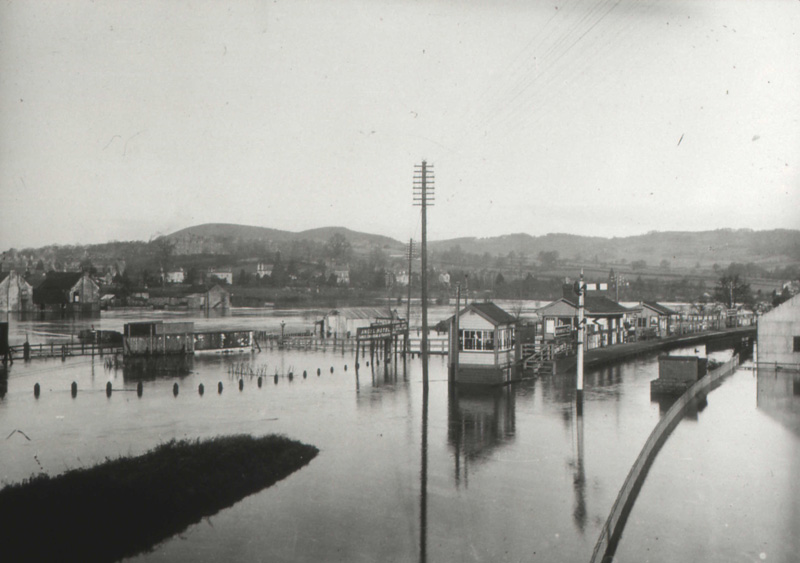
- May Hill Station during floods, probably in 1910. The River Wye runs across middle of the picture and quayside buildings are located to the middle and left.

General information
- Location: Monmouth, Monmouthshire; Wales
- Grid reference: SO514128
- Platforms: 1

Other information
- Status: Disused

History
- Pre-grouping: Ross and Monmouth Railway
- Post-grouping: Great Western Railway

Key dates
- 4 August 1873: Opened
- 5 January 1959: Closed
Location

Monmouth Mayhill railway station (alternatively Monmouth May Hill railway station) is a disused railway station on the Ross and Monmouth Railway which was opened in 1873 and closed in 1959. It was one of two stations that served the town of Monmouth, Wales and was situated on the opposite bank of the river River Wye from Monmouth. It was the initial terminus of the line, but the line was extended across the River Wye to the junction station of Monmouth Troy in 1874 with the construction of the Duke of Beaufort Bridge.

Mayhill was originally opened as a temporary station, but it soon became permanent. It was built on the site of May Hill Wharf, where goods were loaded onto barges on the River Wye. Sidings at Mayhill once served a timber yard and gas works. The station building was demolished but the single platform still exists, in the middle of an industrial estate.

Preceding station	Disused railways	Following station
Monmouth Troy	Ross and Monmouth Railway; British Railways	Hadnock Halt
