= Goodrich, Herefordshire =

Village in England

Coordinates: 51.871°N 2.619°W

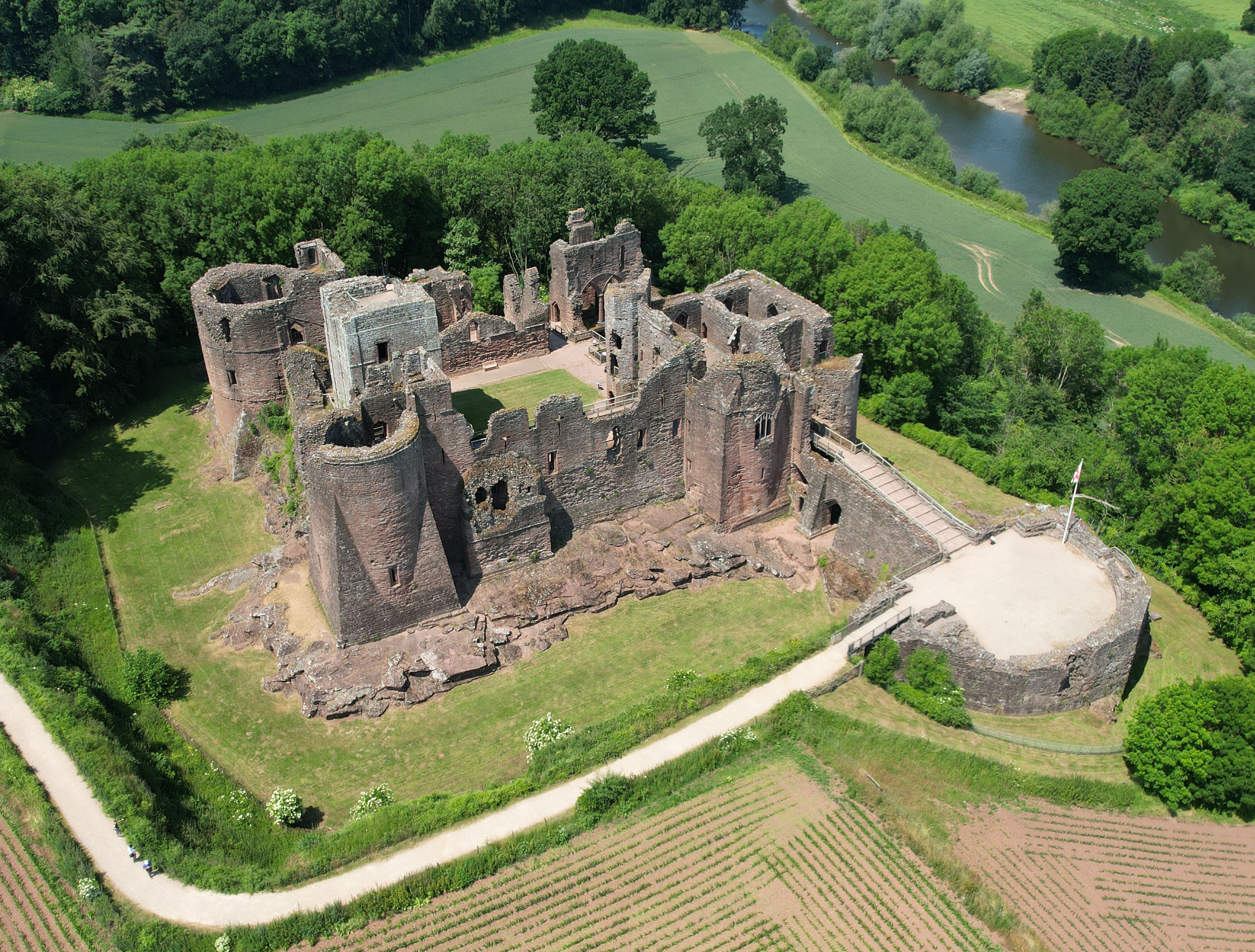
aerial view of Goodrich Castle

Goodrich is a village and civil parish in south Herefordshire, England close to Gloucestershire and the Forest of Dean, situated near the River Wye at grid reference SO574193. It is known for its Norman and mediaeval castle built with Old Red Sandstone.

== Location and history ==
The parish includes the neighbouring hamlet of Symonds Yat East and had population at the 2011 census of 550. The village grew up next to Goodrich Castle, a 'Marcher Castle' dating to c. 1101 which stands on a high spur of land commanding a strategic position above Kerne Bridge, an ancient crossing point of the Wye. Goodrich is on the A40 trunk road which forms part of the main route between South Wales and the West Midlands but is in a sheltered rural location. Goodrich has not retained its village shop or post office but has kept a village hall and two public houses. The village has a tennis club with three all-weather courts and an active village cricket club.

== Notable buildings ==
=== Church of St Giles ===
The Church of St Giles contains the tomb of the Countess of Salisbury, who was charged by Henry Bolingbroke with bringing up his son, later to become King Henry V, after the death of Mary de Bohun his first wife. The young boy was brought up at nearby Courtfield at Welsh Bicknor.

=== Goodrich Castle ===
Goodrich Castle was first known as Castellum Godrici after Godric of Mappestone, the builder of the first castle on the site. Over time the name changed to Goodrich and the castle changed hands many times through the centuries, passing from family to family. In 1646, near the end of the English Civil War, the castle was besieged and captured, using a cannon cast in the Forest of Dean called Roaring Meg, from Sir Henry Lingen by Parliamentarians led by Colonel Birch. The castle is now in the care of English Heritage.

=== Goodrich Court ===
Goodrich Court was a country house built between 1828 and 1831 by Sir Samuel Rush Meyrick. Goodrich Court and other nearby buildings became the evacuation home to Felsted School in the World War II years 1940–1945. The court was demolished in the 1950s, although the stables, a walled garden, and a gatehouse, the Monmouth Gate, remain. Sculptor Jon Edgar lived and worked here between 2004 and 2007.

=== Rocklands House ===
Rocklands House is listed on the English Heritage Register. It was built in the 1700s and substantial additions were made in 1800.

== Role in history of aesthetics ==
Goodrich's prominent position overlooking the River Wye meant that both Castle and Court were stopping points on the first Wye Tour of William Gilpin in 1770. The trip from Ross-on-Wye to Monmouth was instrumental in the development of The Picturesque and Picturesque Tourism. The Coppett hill nature reserve stretches along a hill above the Wye south of the village.

== Railways ==
The village was served by the Ross and Monmouth Railway at Kerne Bridge station between 1873 and 1959 running through the scenic Wye Valley.
