= Walford Halt railway station =

Former railway station in Herefordshire, England

Walford Halt

General information
- Location: Walford, Herefordshire; England
- Coordinates: 51.8819°N 2.6028°W
- Grid reference: SO586205
- Platforms: 1

Other information
- Status: Disused

History
- Post-grouping: Great Western Railway

Key dates
- 23 February 1931: Opened
- 5 January 1959: Closed
Location

Walford Halt railway station is a disused halt on the Ross and Monmouth Railway constructed near the Herefordshire village of Walford. It also served the surrounding settlements. Nothing remains of the station. It was located approximately 3 miles 12 chains (5.1 km) along the railway from Ross-on-Wye station.

== History ==
It was opened by the Great Western Railway on 23 February 1931 and consisted of a 120 feet (37 m) platform and a small hut on the east side of the line. It was unstaffed and had no freight facilities or sidings. The staff of Kerne Bridge station lit the platform lights and cleaned the stop, though its traffic receipts were counted with Ross-on-Wye's.

The halt closed on 5 January 1959 when the Ross and Monmouth Railway was closed to passengers. The track was still used from Ross-on-Wye to Lydbrook until 1965 as a private siding to serve a cable works.

Preceding station	Disused railways	Following station
Kerne Bridge	Ross and Monmouth Railway; British Railways	Ross-on-Wye

== Bibliography ==
- Parkhouse, Neil (2013a). "6: The Ross & Monmouth Railway". West Gloucester & Wye Valley Lines. British Railway History In Colour. Vol. 1. Lydney: Lightmoor Press. pp. 167–200. ISBN 9781899889 76 1.
