= Lydbrook Junction railway station =

Former railway station in Gloucestershire, England

Coordinates: 51.8529°N 2.6034°W

Lydbrook Junction

General information
- Location: Lydbrook, Forest of Dean; England
- Grid reference: SO585172
- Platforms: 4

Other information
- Status: Disused

History
- Pre-grouping: Ross and Monmouth Railway
- Post-grouping: Great Western Railway

Key dates
- 4 August 1873: Opened
- 5 January 1959: Closed
Location

Lydbrook Junction railway station is a disused railway station in England opened by the Ross and Monmouth Railway in 1873, it remained open for 91 years until 1964 when the line finally closed to freight, though passenger services ceased in 1959. The station was constructed in the hamlet of Stowfield approximately 1/2 mile (0.80 km)} from Lydbrook and its viaduct on the Severn and Wye Railway. It was located approximately 4 miles 34 chains (7.1 km) along the railway from Ross-on-Wye station. In 1874 the Severn and Wye Railway opened a branch from Serridge Junction and Cinderford, passenger services commenced in 1875. All passenger trains along the S&W branch were withdrawn from 1929.

== History ==
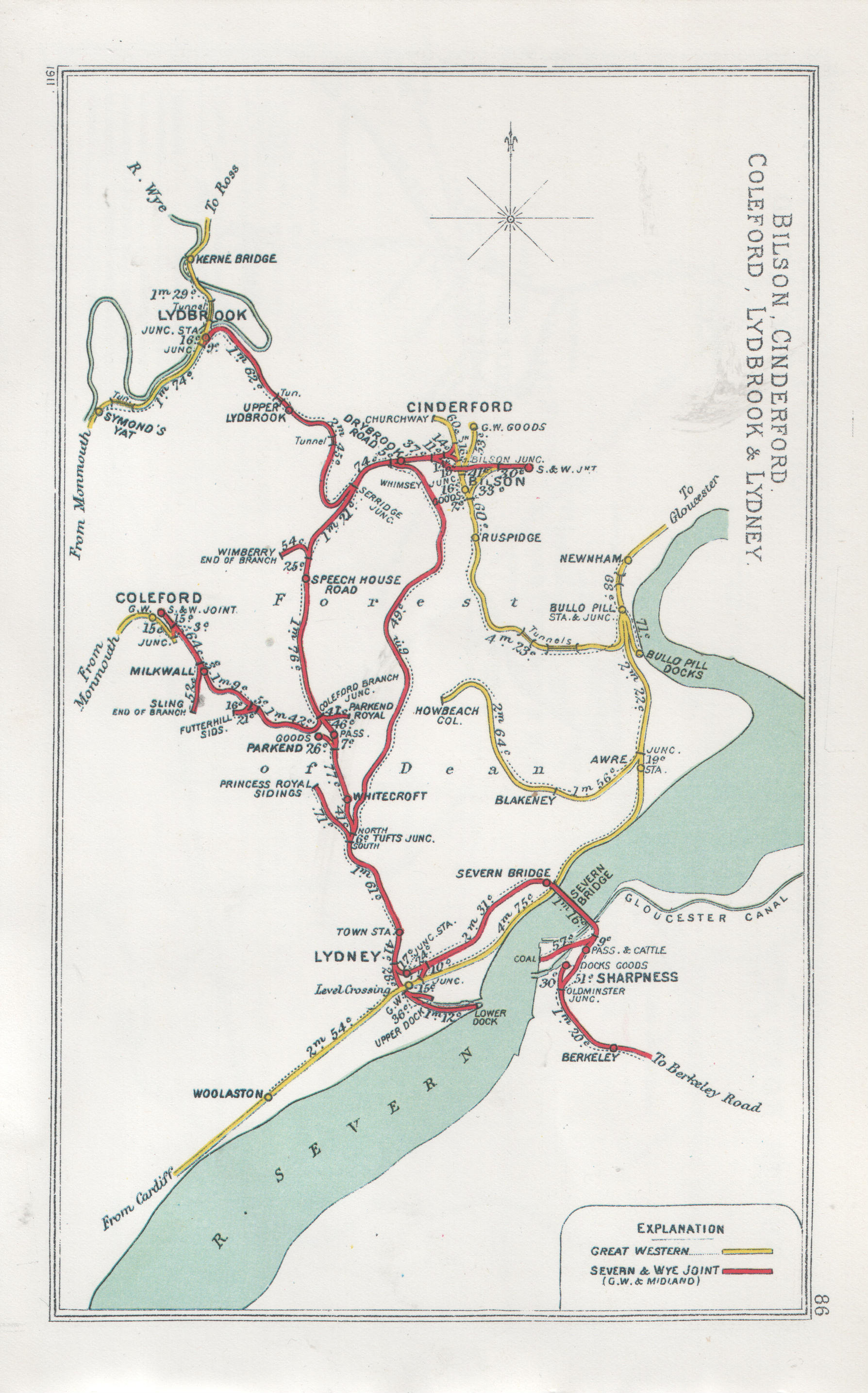
A 1911 Railway Clearing House map of railways in the vicinity of Lydbrook Junction

The station was built by the Ross and Monmouth Railway which ran between Monmouth and Ross-on-Wye heading along the route of the River Wye, the Severn and Wye Railway which went south east into the Forest of Dean met the railway soon after.

It was situated on the south side of the River Wye and consisted of four platforms, (two on each line) a middle sized stone L-shaped station building, a large Great Western Railway style signal box at the end of the R&MR up platform. It also had a goods yard with two sidings and facilities for coal, livestock and general freight. The goods shed was just a small structure by the side of the station building on the R&MR down platform.

The Ross and Monmouth Railway ran trains to the station from 1873 and the first train between Lydney and Lydbrook on the Severn and Wye Railway ran on 23 September 1875. The Severn and Wye Railway closed to passengers on 8 July 1929 and to goods in 1951. It was dismantled in 1966. The Ross and Monmouth Railway closed in 1959.

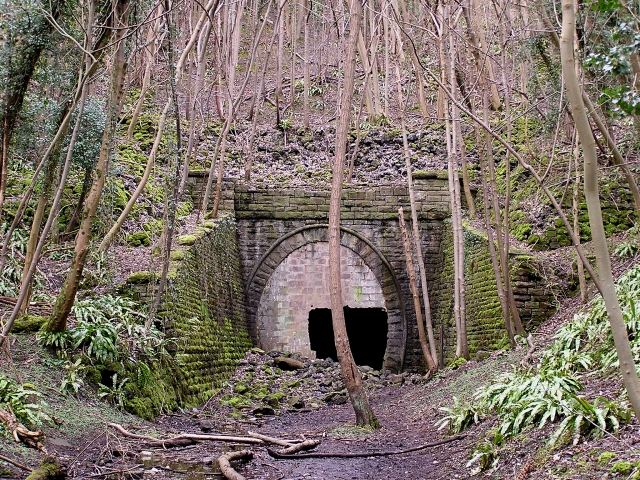
Nearby tunnel under Coppett Hill, Herefordshire.

Lydbrook was served by two further railway stations, Upper Lydbrook, and a halt Lower Lydbrook; both were on the Severn and Wye Railway.

Preceding station	Disused railways	Following station
Symonds Yat	Ross and Monmouth Railway; British Railways	Kerne Bridge
Terminus	Severn and Wye Railway; British Railways	Lower Lydbrook
