= Kerne Bridge railway station =

Former railway station in Herefordshire, England

Kerne Bridge
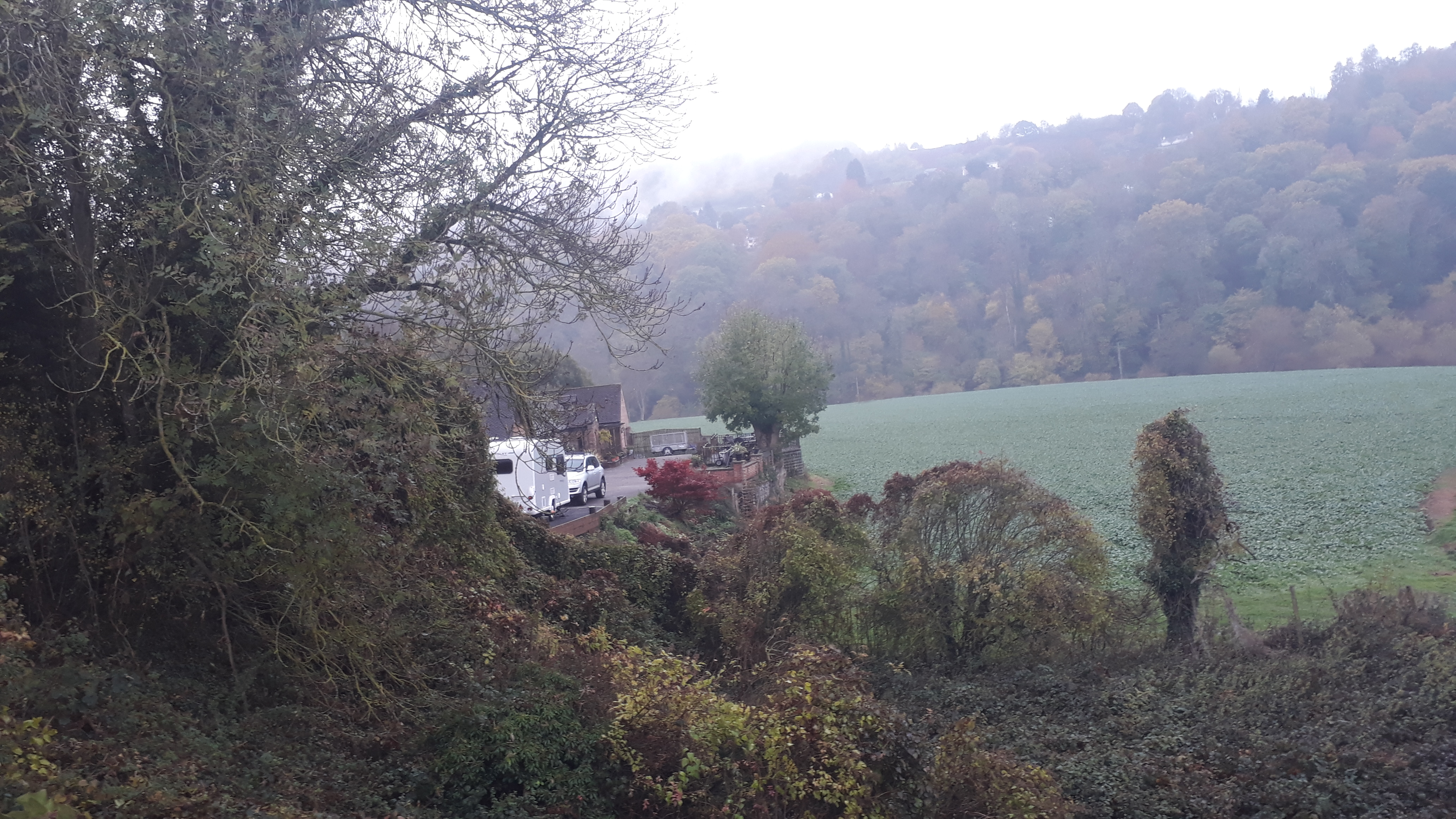

General information
- Location: Kerne Bridge, Herefordshire; England
- Coordinates: 51.8690°N 2.6101°W
- Grid reference: SO580190
- Platforms: 2

Other information
- Status: Disused

History
- Pre-grouping: Ross and Monmouth Railway
- Post-grouping: Great Western Railway

Key dates
- 4 August 1873: Opened
- 5 January 1959: Closed
Location

Kerne Bridge railway station is a disused railway station on the Ross and Monmouth Railway constructed in the Herefordshire hamlet of Kerne Bridge which also served the village of Goodrich across the River Wye.

== History ==
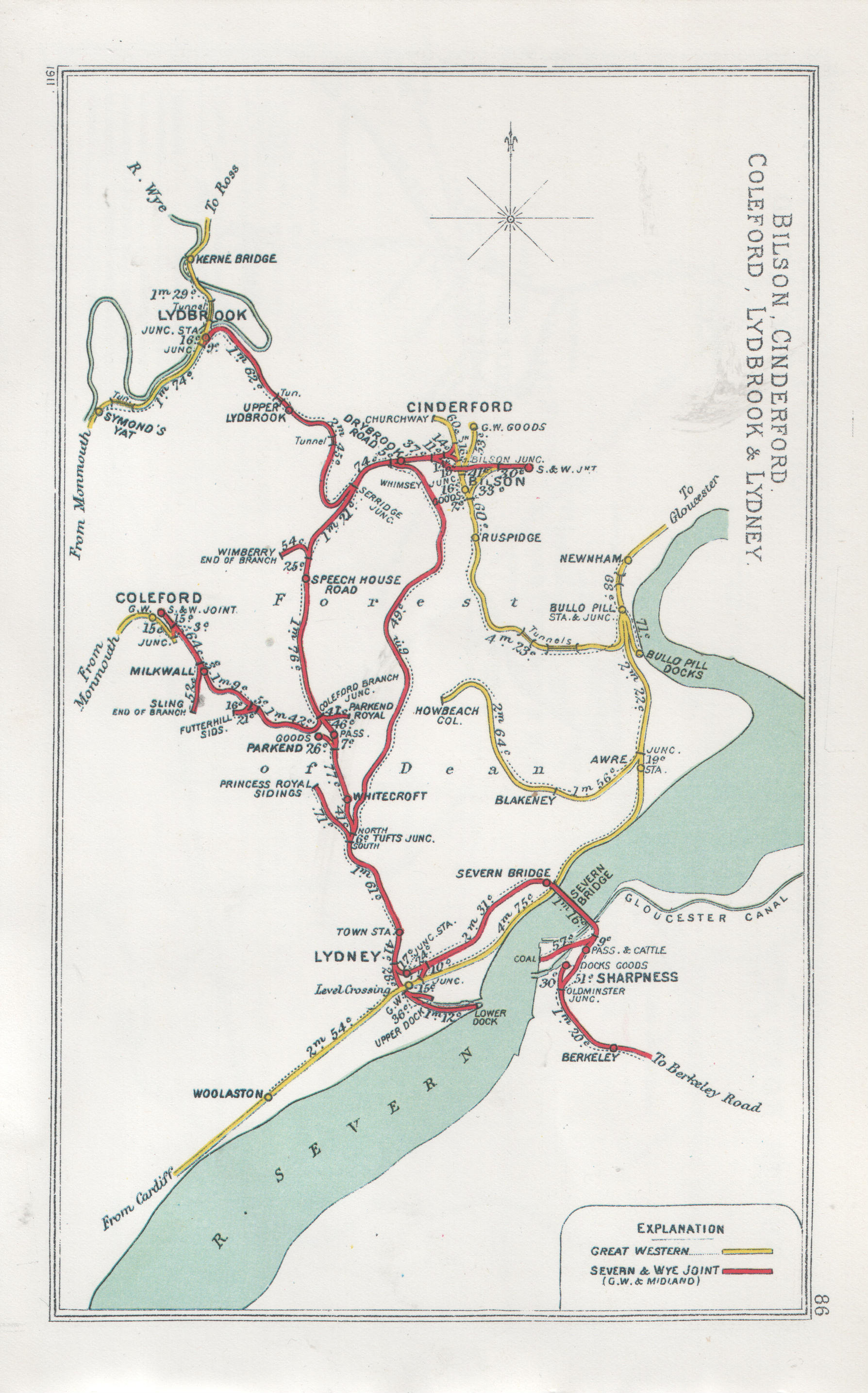
A 1911 Railway Clearing House map of railways in the vicinity of Kerne Bridge

The station was opened in August 1873 and was located next to the single-span road bridge on the left bank of the river. It was closed in 1959 when the line was closed to passengers but the track remained used until 1965. After many years as an Outward Bound activity centre, the building is now a private house. It was located approximately 4 miles and 10 chains along the railway from Ross-on-Wye station.

== Layout ==
The station consisted of a loop and goods siding, two platforms and a stone station building. This building was similar to the stations on the Northampton and Banbury Junction Railway as both lines were constructed by the same engineer, Edward Richards. The name-board on the platform read 'Kerne Bridge' for Goodrich Castle in an attempt to attract more passengers. The second platform and run-round loop was changed into a siding in 1901. The siding on the old platform had a GWR camp coach from 1935 to 1939. A camping coach was also positioned here by the Western Region in 1952 and from 1955 to 1958. Timber was one of the most important goods at the station, but the station also had facilities for coal and livestock transport. There was a staff of three in the early 20th century, but as traffic eventually declined the number of staff fell.

Preceding station	Disused railways	Following station
Lydbrook Junction	Ross and Monmouth Railway; British Railways	Walford Halt

== Sources ==
- Parkhouse, Neil (2013a). "6: The Ross & Monmouth Railway". West Gloucester & Wye Valley Lines. British Railway History In Colour. Vol. 1. Lydney: Lightmoor Press. pp. 167–200. ISBN 9781899889 76 1.
