= Ross-on-Wye railway station =

Former railway station in Herefordshire, England

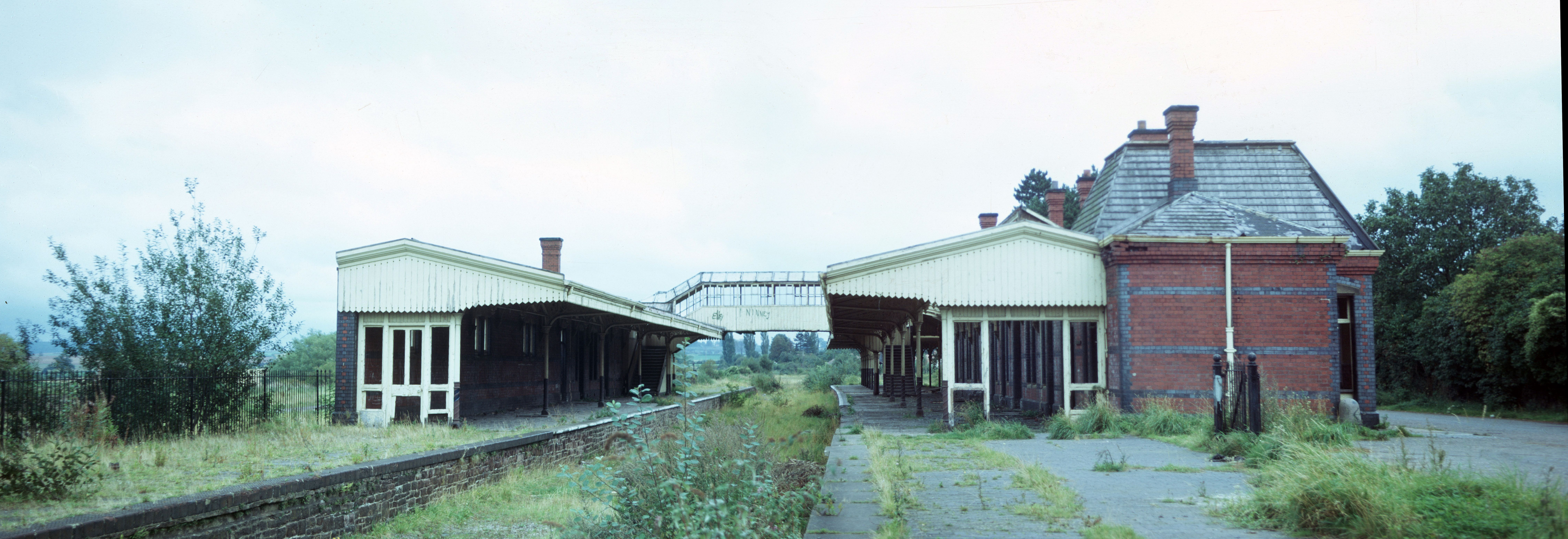
- The derelict station in September 1974.

General information
- Location: Ross-on-Wye, Herefordshire; England
- Coordinates: 51.9163°N 2.5745°W
- Grid reference: SO605243
- Platforms: 3

Other information
- Status: Disused

History
- Original company: Hereford, Ross and Gloucester Railway
- Pre-grouping: Great Western Railway
- Post-grouping: Great Western Railway

Key dates
- 1 June 1855: Opened
- 2 November 1964: Closed for passengers
- 1 November 1965: Closed for freight traffic
Location

Ross-on-Wye served the town of Ross-on-Wye, in Herefordshire, England. It was a junction railway station: the terminus of the Ross and Monmouth Railway, which joined the Hereford, Ross and Gloucester Railway just south of the station.

== History ==
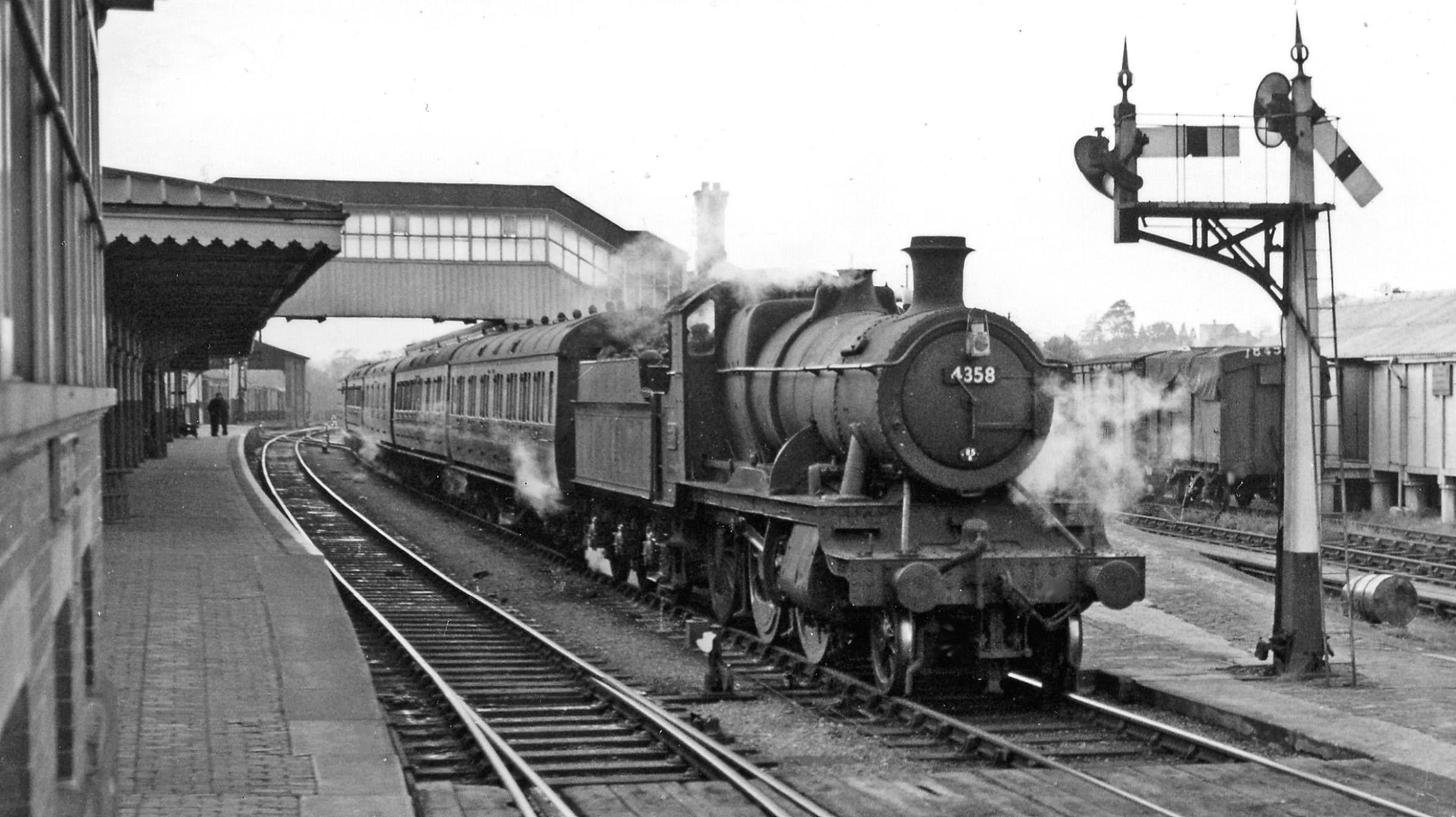
A Hereford to Gloucester train at the station, in 1958

The station was opened on 1 June 1855 by the Hereford, Ross and Gloucester Railway, four years after line had received parliamentary consent to be constructed. A line from Ross-on-Wye to Tewkesbury was authorised by parliament in 1856, but was never built.

On 29 July 1862, the line was amalgamated with the Great Western Railway and, in 1869, the line was converted from broad gauge to standard gauge in a five-day period. The wide door of the broad gauge engine shed was partially bricked up, leaving a standard gauge opening that remained for the life of the shed. In 1873, the Ross and Monmouth Railway to Monmouth via Lydbrook was opened and it terminated at the station. The station then passed on to the Western Region of British Railways on nationalisation in 1948.

The lines to Ross closed in stages. On the Ross and Monmouth Railway, passenger services were withdrawn and the section from Lydbrook Junction to Monmouth Troy was closed on 5 January 1959. The remaining section remained open until 1 November 1965 for freight traffic only. The Hereford, Ross and Gloucester Railway closed to passengers on 2 November 1964 and the line south to the junction at Grange Court closed on 1 November 1965. The line going north to Rotherwas Junction and Hereford closed when passenger service were withdrawn in 1964.

The Severn Valley Railway station at Kidderminster Town is based on the design for Ross-on-Wye even down to the decorative cast roof crestings; the patterns for which were derived from measurement of segments of the original ones.

=== Stationmasters ===
- Mr. Grundy ca. 1856
- James Rycroft 1865-1885
- William Francis Marvin 1889-1899 (later the stationmaster at Gloucester)
- Ernest C. Peglar 1900-1911 (formerly stationmaster at Abergavenny)
- W.P. Roberts 1911-1915 (later the stationmaster at Stroud)
- A.J. Bannister D.S.O. 1915-1921 (later the stationmaster at Paignton)
- W.J. Fey 1921-1925 (formerly stationmaster at Lydney and Grange Court)
- C.J. Rees 1925-1930 (formerly stationmaster at Whimsy)
- R.W. Kilvington 1931
- Allan A. Crabbe 1931-1932 (later the stationmaster at Cheltenham)

Preceding station	Disused railways	Following station
Walford Halt	Ross and Monmouth Railway; British Railways	Terminus
Weston under Penyard Halt	Hereford, Ross and Gloucester Railway; British Railways	Backney Halt

== The site today ==
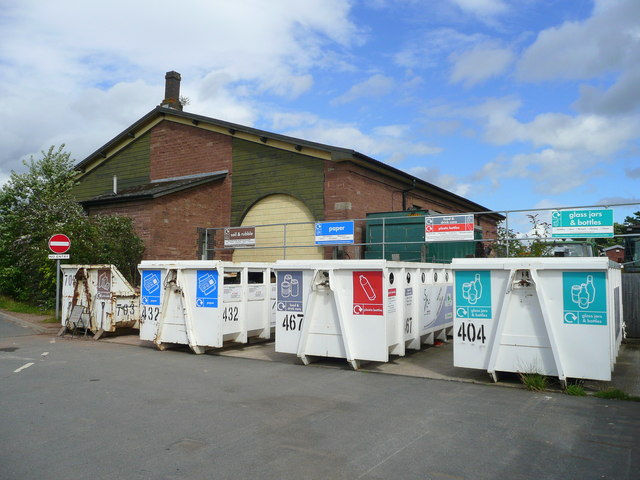
The former station yard

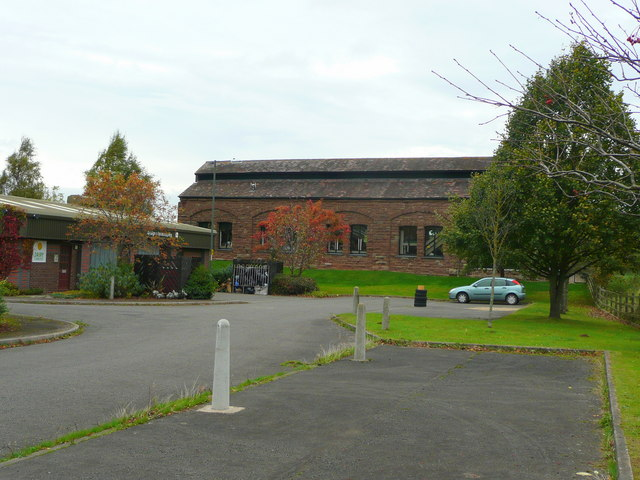
A former Great Western Railway shed, now a garden centre

The brick built station building has been demolished and the site redeveloped into an industrial estate. The brick goods and engine sheds still stand.
