= Ross and Monmouth Railway =

Railway in the United Kingdom

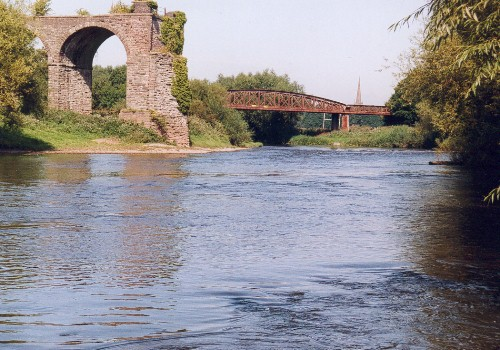
- The bridge in the background is the iron bridge which was opened in 1874 to allow the line to reach Monmouth Troy

Overview
- Locale: Monmouthshire-Herefordshire
- Termini: Ross-on-Wye; Monmouth
- Stations: Seven

Service
- Operator(s): Great Western Railway

History
- Opened: 4 August 1873
- Closed: 1959

Technical
- Line length: 13 mi (21 km)
- Track gauge: 1,435 mm (4 ft 8 1/2 in) standard gauge

The Ross and Monmouth Railway was a standard gauge railway of 13 miles (21 km) which ran between Ross-on-Wye, in Herefordshire, England and Monmouth, Wales.

It was authorised in 1865 and opened in 1873, with a final extension at Monmouth delayed until 1874. It ran through picturesque terrain in the Upper Wye Valley, but construction costs considerably overran early estimates. The promoters hoped their line would form part of a trunk route for goods and mineral traffic between South Wales and the English Midlands, but this never developed. In fact although Monmouth was a junction for several local railways, it too never became the busy traffic centre that had been forecast.

The line was worked by the Great Western Railway from the outset, and the Ross and Monmouth Railway Company was simply a financial concern, receiving lease payments from the GWR, until absorption in 1922.

The decline in the use of local railways rendered the line heavily loss-making and in 1959 passenger services were withdrawn. Some residual goods services were retained, but in 1965 all commercial railway activity on the line ceased.

== Earlier lines ==
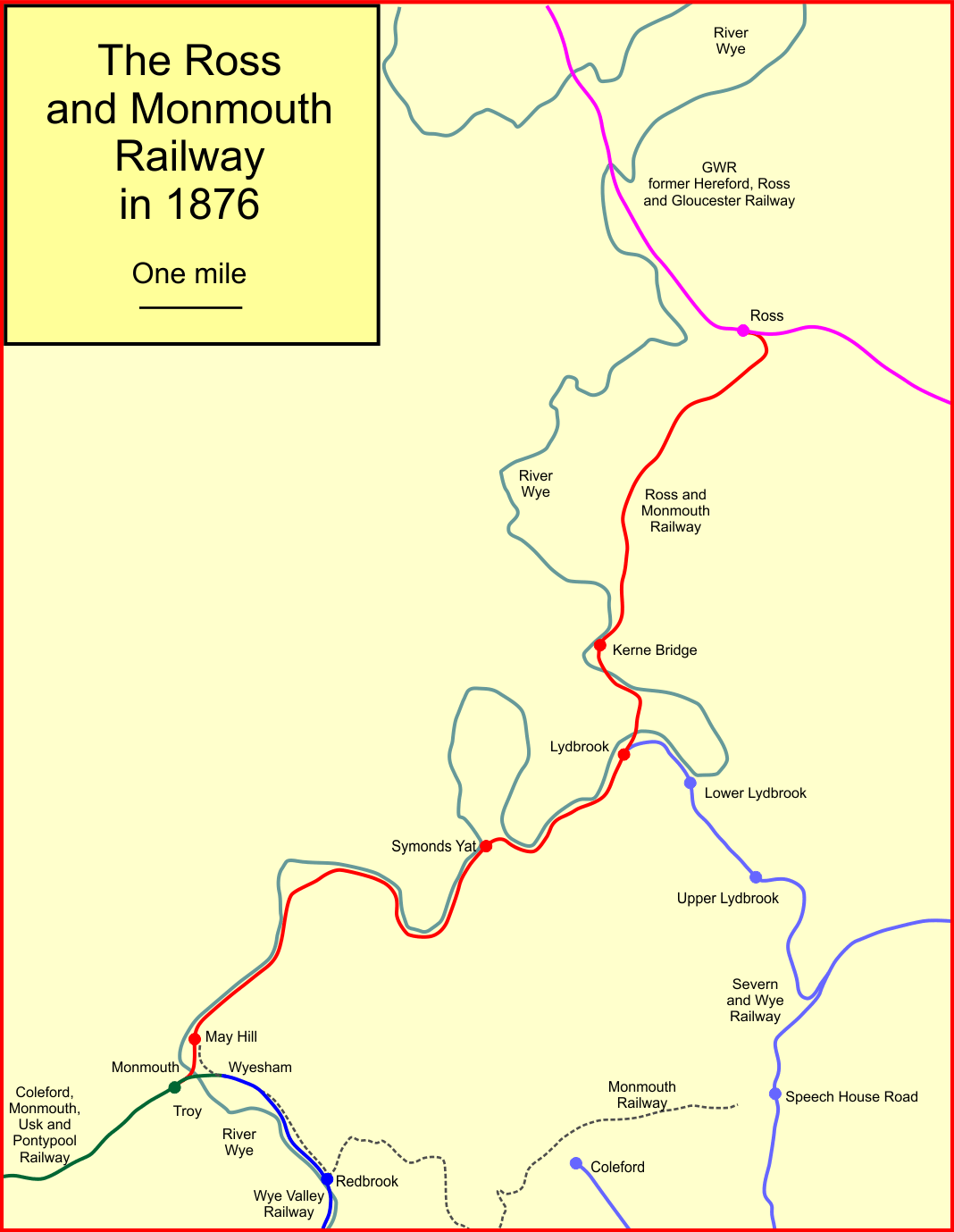
System map of the Ross and Monmouth Railway

In 1844 the prospectus of the South Wales Railway was issued. It was to form a great undertaking linking London by means of its associated company, the Great Western Railway and Ireland, by extending to a ferry port in south-west Wales. The line was to cross the River Severn by a bridge south of Gloucester and then follow the bank of the river to Chepstow and then to Newport and beyond. Monmouth was important enough that it was stated that the line would pass within "easy distance" of the town, but that claim was comparative.

The residents of Monmouth urged a change of route, to run through Gloucester, Monmouth, Usk and Caerleon to reach Newport. In fact the proposed line of route east of Chepstow was rejected in Parliament, largely due to Admiralty objections to the bridge over the Severn, and the project was authorised west of Chepstow only in the 1845 session of Parliament; however there was to be a branch to Monmouth.

The promoters of the South Wales Railway returned to Parliament in the 1846 session of Parliament, with alternative proposals for crossing the Severn, but these were rejected once again, and a longer route through Gloucester, crossing the Severn there, was accepted. In fact the Cheltenham and Great Western Union Railway was the means of reaching Gloucester on the east side of the Severn. On the west side, the Gloucester and Dean Forest Railway had been authorised in 1845, to connect with the Monmouth and Hereford Railway near Grange Court. This would close the missing link to the South Wales Railway, and in fact the Great Western Railway took over the truncated Gloucester and Dean Forest Railway powers and built that section themselves.

For the time being, this eliminated the pressure for Monmouth to be on the main line of the South Wales Railway: the town would be on the Monmouth and Hereford Railway, with a direct link to Gloucester and the metropolis.

This situation was disrupted by a collapse of the stock market, and the resulting financial crisis brought to an end for some years the easy availability of investment money for railway schemes, and the Monmouth and Hereford Railway progressed no further.

By 1850 stability had returned, and it was feasible to promote the Hereford, Ross and Gloucester Railway, linking with the Great Western Railway at Grange Court. This line, supported by the Great Western Railway, obtained its authorising act of Parliament, the Hereford, Ross and Gloucester Railway Act 1851 (14 & 15 Vict. c. xl), on 5 June 1851, and it opened throughout on 15 June 1855. This brought a broad gauge main line railway within 8 miles of Monmouth, at Ross-on-Wye.

Monmouth was more firmly to be connected to the railway network when the Coleford, Monmouth, Usk and Pontypool Railway opened its line in 1857. The intention of the promoters of this line was to give a route for the iron and coal products of the Forest of Dean around Coleford, to the ironworks of South Wales, in particular to Nantyglo, Ebbw Vale and Dowlais. The Coleford, Monmouth, Usk and Pontypool Railway Company opened its line from near Pontypool to the Troy station at Monmouth, on 12 October 1857. This was a standard gauge line. Shortage of money meant that the company did not attempt the construction of the authorised extension from Monmouth to Coleford, which would have required an expensive crossing of the River Wye.

== Monmouth and Ross to be connected ==
Ross and Monmouth Railway Act 1865
- Act of Parliament
- Parliament of the United Kingdom
- Long title: An Act to authorize the Construction of a Railway between Ross and Monmouth; and for other Purposes.
- Citation: 28 & 29 Vict. c. cccxii

Dates
- Royal assent: 5 July 1865

Text of statute as originally enacted

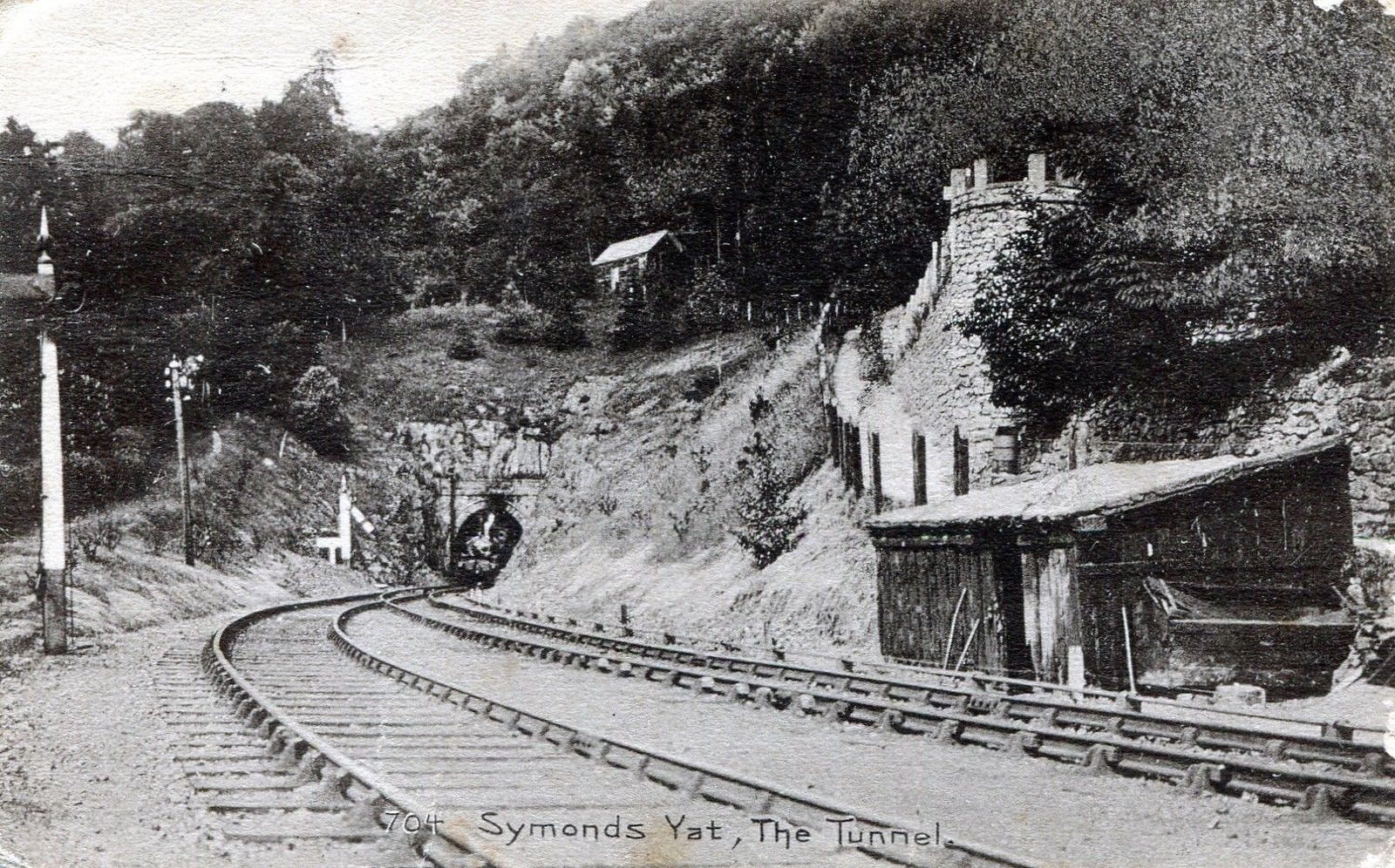
Symonds Yat tunnel with train emerging 1895

This encouraged local promoters to consider a scheme to link Monmouth and Ross-on-Wye. The relatively short distance might not incur excessive cost, and it was possible that the line could form part of an important chain of railways through to the industrial districts of the West Midlands. The scheme went to Parliament, and on 5 July 1865 the Ross and Monmouth Railway Act 1865 (28 & 29 Vict. c. cccxii) received royal assent; capital for the Ross and Monmouth Railway was to be £120,000. It would be a standard gauge line, 13 miles in length.

Ross and Monmouth Railway Act 1867
- Act of Parliament
- Parliament of the United Kingdom
- Long title: An Act to extend the Time for the Purchase of Lands for and Completion of the Ross and Monmouth Railway; to enable the Ross and Monmouth Railway Company to divert a Portion of their Railway; and for other Purposes.
- Citation: 30 & 31 Vict. c. lxvii

Dates
- Royal assent: 31 May 1867

Text of statute as originally enacted

The directors soon had second thoughts about the route of their railway. Instead of being on the west of the River Wye (roughly the line of the present-day A40 road) a route following the west bank of the river seemed to be preferable; a branch to Lydbrook, where there were extensive mineral deposits, was now included, and an increase of capital to £160,000 was sought. This was authorised by an act of Parliament, the Ross and Monmouth Railway Act 1867 (30 & 31 Vict. c. lxvii) of 31 May 1867.

The contractor selected for the construction was John Firbank. The topography, in particular the valley of the River Wye, meant that there were considerable earthworks necessary to make the line. In addition there were three bridges over the Wye, a tunnel at Symonds Yat and another at Lydbrook. In fact the construction of this section proved much more difficult, and expensive, than had been imagined. By 30 June 1872, expenditure had reach £201,650.

== Opening ==
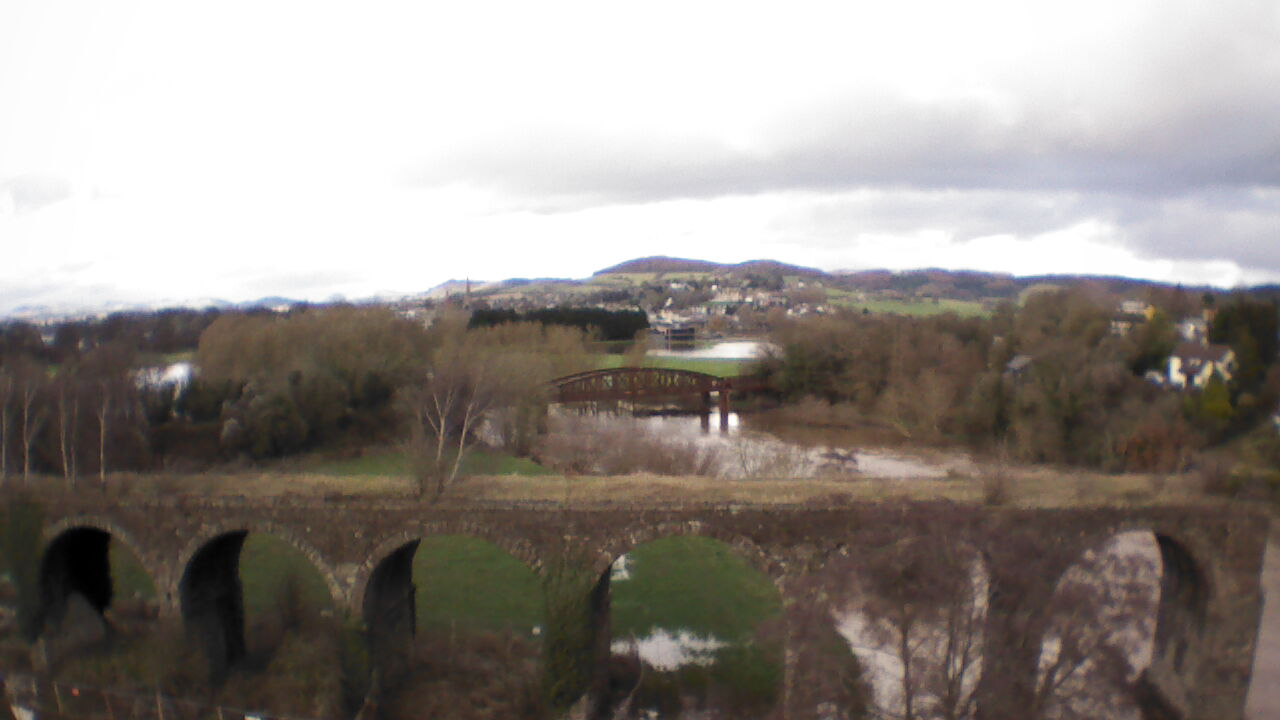
River Wye bridges at Monmouth: in the foreground the Wye Valley Railway and background Ross and Monmouth Railway.

Eventually the line was ready between Ross and a station, intended to be temporary, was erected at May Hill, Monmouth, and an opening date of Friday 1 August 1873 was published. This was subject to approval by the Board of Trade Inspecting Officer, Colonel Rich. Although he found the line to be generally satisfactory, subject to a number of detail corrections, he stipulated that in the absence of a turntable at May Hill only tank engines might be used on the line. It was Board of Trade policy at the time to avoid tender-first running. It did not prove possible to procure tank engines in time for the planned opening date, and in fact the line opened to May Hill on Monday 4 August 1873. The line was worked from the outset by the Great Western Railway.

The May Hill station at Monmouth was in fact more convenient for pedestrian access to the centre of Monmouth than the Troy station of the Coleford, Monmouth, Usk and Pontypool Railway (CMU&PR), but of course through mineral traffic was hoped for, and work was progressed on the connection, which required a considerable bridge over the River Wye. In January 1874 Colonel Rich returned to the line to inspect the connecting section of line, the bridge over the River Wye having by then been completed. However he found that the columns of the bridge piers were founded on doubtful material and there had been subsidence, and he declined to pass the bridge for passenger operation until bracing had been provided. This was quickly made ready, and on 1 May 1874 the 59 chain section from May Hill to the CMU&PR station at Troy was opened for traffic. Construction had cost £206,554.

The trains used the Hereford, Ross and Gloucester Railway station at Ross-on-Wye and the Troy station at Monmouth. Its own intermediate stations were Kerne Bridge, Lydbrook, Symonds Yat and Monmouth May Hill. Two halts were added later: at Walford, opened in 1931, and at Hadnock, opened in 1951.

== Operations ==
From the outset, the line was operated by the Great Western Railway, in common with the adjacent lines at Monmouth. Some passenger trains ran through from Pontypool Road to Ross and connections were generally arranged where the trains did not. There were typically five trains each way daily, with four working through to or from Pontypool Road. In the Edwardian period there was considerable tourist traffic in the area, in many cases operated by special excursion trains. One goods train daily was the routine for many years, usually working through from Gloucester or Hereford to Monmouth.

Short wheelbase passenger vehicles were used on the line until the 1920s, after which auto-cars became the norm.

== Grouping of the railways ==
The Railways Act 1921 was implemented by the government, obliging most of the railways of Great Britain to be "grouped" into four large companies. The Great Western Railway (GWR) was one of the four groups, and absorbed many smaller railways in its area of influence. One of these was the Ross and Monmouth Railway, which was a financial company only: the GWR already operated the line as part of its own network, paying the R&MR a lease charge. For many companies the effective date of absorption was 1 January 1923, but for some companies whose position was straightforward, the date was earlier. The Ross and Monmouth Railway was absorbed from 1 July 1922. Its issued capital was £210,000; its net income in 1921 was £8,162, and the dividend on ordinary shares in that year was 1.75%.

== Diesel railcars ==
The GWR introduced diesel railcars in the 1930s for use on lightly operated passenger services; the Railway Magazine reported in May 1936:

On March 23, railcar no. 14 entered service to work 17 existing steam-train services, and also to provide two new passenger services, in the Newport, Chepstow, Monmouth, Pontypool Road, Panteg and Blaenavon area... The daily number of diesel railcar services is now 132.

== From 1948 ==
On 1 January 1948 the main line railways of Great Britain were taken into state ownership, as part of British Railways.

It was obvious that the railways serving Monmouth were under-used and loss-making, and British Railways was under pressure to control the mounting financial losses, which had to be funded by the taxpayer. The Pontypool Road to Monmouth line was closed completely on 29 May 1955.

At the end of 1957, the diesel railcars working in the area were taken off, and the local passenger workings reverted to steam auto-train working.

== Closure ==
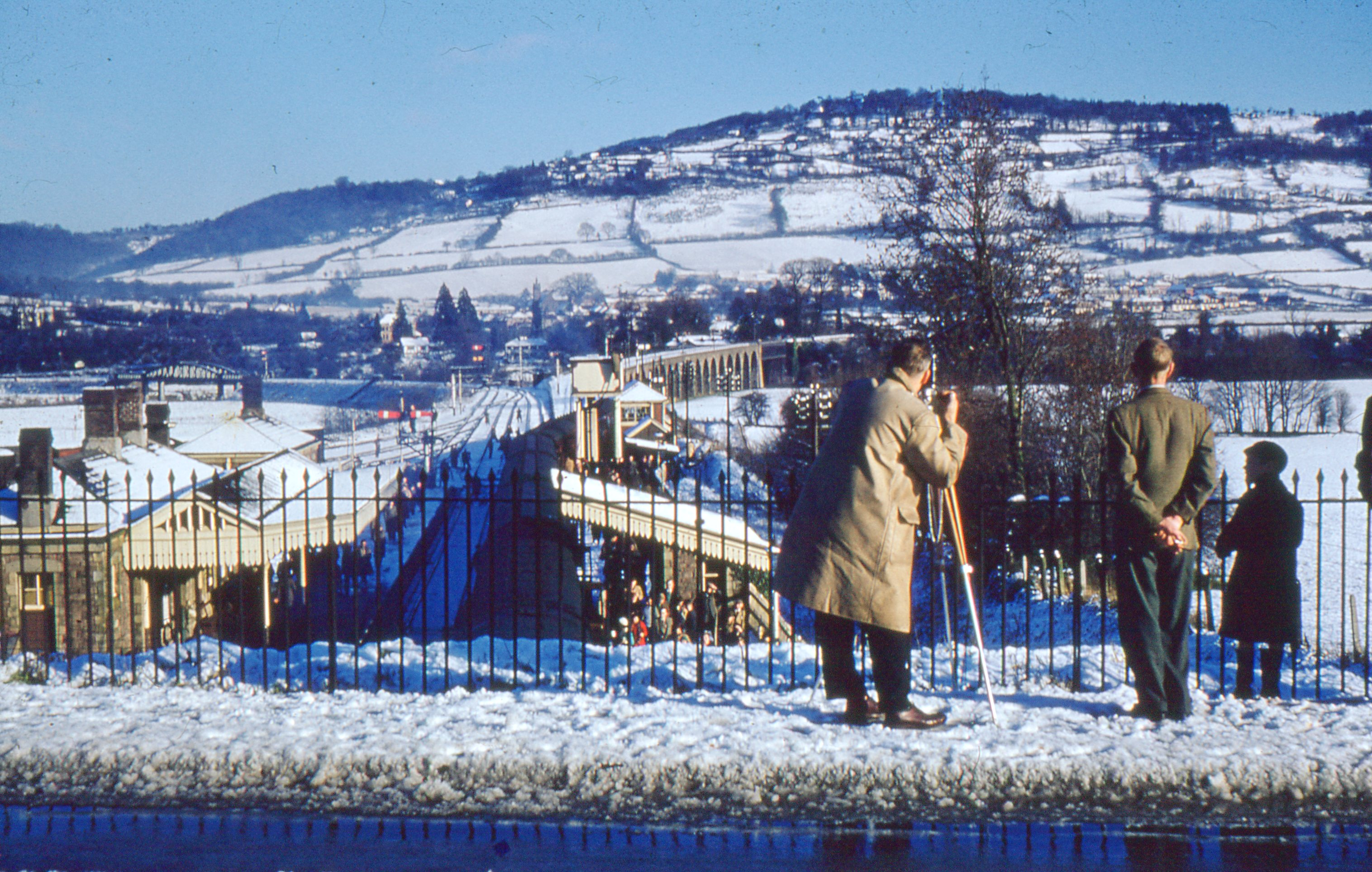
Last train leaving Monmouth Troy in 1959.

The mounting losses forced British Railways to examine the remaining lines at Monmouth, and at length it was announced that the Ross and Monmouth line, and the Wye Valley line, would close to passenger operation from 5 January 1959. The last ordinary train ran on 3 January 1959, and a Stephenson Locomotive Society special train traversed the line on 4 January 1959.

The section between Lydbrook Junction and Monmouth May Hill was closed completely. A Ministry of Food depot at May Hill continued to be accessible by goods train from Troy, until that section closed on 6 January 1964. There was a private siding at Lydbrook Junction and this sustained the section from Ross-on-Wye (and Grange Court), including the provision of public goods stations at Lydbrook Junction (closed 2 November 1964) and Kerne Bridge (closed 10 August 1964). The private siding closed on 1 November 1965, and that was the end of rail services on the former Ross and Monmouth Railway.

== Route ==
From Ross-on-Wye station the line left in an eastward direction and curved south, passing Walford (later the site of Walford Halt), then converging with the eastern bank of the River Wye. Reaching Kerne Bridge station there was a station close to a road bridge over the Wye, giving access to Goodrich. From this point the river takes a wide sweep to the east, and the railway continued broadly southward, crossing the river and passing through Lydbrook Tunnel (633 yards) and re-crossing the river. The railway then ran to Lydbrook station, where a branch line of the Severn and Wye Railway trailed in at Lydbrook Junction.

Continuing to follow the south bank of the river, the line passed through Symonds Yat (433 yards) where the river takes a northward sweep. The railway then ran past Hadnock to Monmouth May Hill station, crossing the River Wye by Monmouth Viaduct, and finally arriving at Monmouth Troy station.

== Station list ==
- Ross; opened 1 June 1855; renamed Ross-on-Wye 1933; closed 2 November 1964;
- Walford Halt; opened 23 February 1931; closed 5 January 1959;
- Kerne Bridge; opened 4 August 1873; closed 5 January 1959;
- Lydbrook; opened 4 August 1873; renamed Lydbrook Junction 1899; closed 5 January 1959;
- Symonds Yat; opened 4 August 1873; closed 5 January 1959;
- Hadnock Halt; opened 7 May 1951; closed 5 January 1959;
- Monmouth Mayhill; opened 4 August 1873; closed 5 January 1959;
- Monmouth Troy; opened October 1857; closed 5 January 1959.
