= Monmouth Troy railway station =

Former railway station in Monmouthshire, Wales

Monmouth Troy
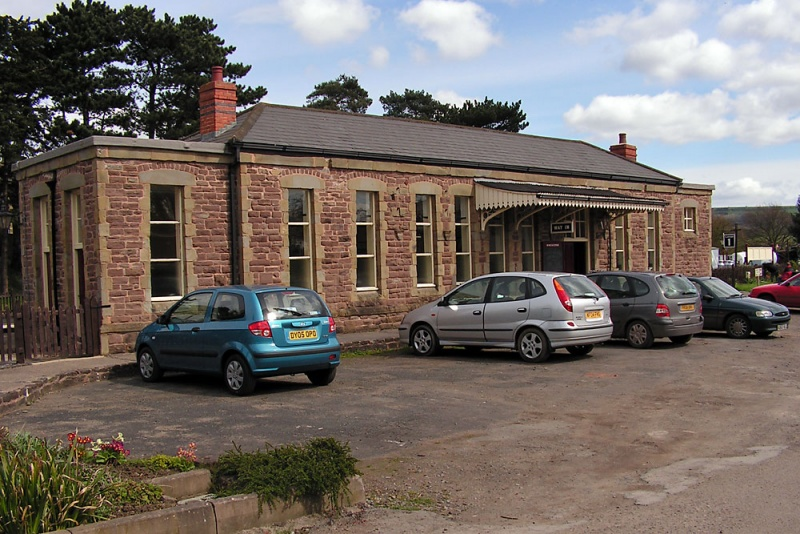
- The former Monmouth Troy station building has been re-erected at Winchcombe railway station on the Gloucestershire Warwickshire Railway.

General information
- Location: Monmouth, Monmouthshire; Wales
- Platforms: 2

Other information
- Status: Disused

History
- Original company: Coleford, Monmouth, Usk and Pontypool Railway (Note: Also used by the Wye Valley Railway, Ross and Monmouth Railway and Coleford Railway.)
- Pre-grouping: Great Western Railway (Note: All lines except the Ross and Monmouth Railway were acquired by the Great Western Railway before the Railways Act 1921.)
- Post-grouping: Great Western Railway

Key dates
- October 1857: Station opened
- 5 January 1959: Closed to passengers
- January 1964: Closed to goods
Location

Monmouth Troy was one of the two former railway stations at Monmouth. It was built in 1857 by the Coleford, Monmouth, Usk and Pontypool Railway and was used by several other branch lines as the local rail network expanded. The station closed in January 1964 following the closure of the last two lines to the station, the Wye Valley Railway and the Ross and Monmouth Railway.

== History ==
Monmouth Troy was built for the Coleford, Monmouth, Usk and Pontypool Railway near to Troy House, and opened on 12 October 1857. It was the larger of the two stations in Monmouth, the other station being Monmouth Mayhill. The Ross & Monmouth Railway found its way to Monmouth Troy in 1874 followed shortly by the Wye Valley Railway in 1876, the Coleford Railway came later in 1883.

The Coleford Railway closed in 1917. The Coleford, Monmouth, Usk and Pontypool Railway withdrew passenger services in 1955, followed by freight services on 12 October 1957. The Wye Valley Railway and Ross and Monmouth Railway struggled on until 1959, when both railways withdrew passenger services. Freight services on both lines to Monmouth Troy were continued until 5 January 1964 when the station officially closed to rail services. If Monmouth had remained a county town it would have been the first county town in Britain to lose all its railway services.

=== Goods yard ===
Monmouth Troy Goods Yard (51.8035°N 2.7138°W) was a large goods yard constructed at the same time as the station. It outlived it by nine months until October 1964 when its non-rail depot closed. At its height, the goods yard was used by the Wye Valley Railway, Coleford Railway, Ross and Monmouth Railway as well as the Coleford, Monmouth, Usk and Pontypool Railway. The goods yard closed in 1964 when the last two railways, the former Wye Valley Railway and Ross and Monmouth Railway, closed. The non-rail depot remained open until October 1964.

=== Tunnel ===
The short tunnel directly to the west of the station that took the railway beneath Gibraltar Hill was called Monmouth Troy tunnel. It was 140 yards (130 m) long. It is sometimes confused with the A40 road tunnel, named Gibraltar Tunnel, that passes under the same hill.

=== Monnow Valley Railway ===
In the 1860s, a fourth railway into Monmouth was planned, the Monnow Valley Railway running via Rockfield, Skenfrith and Grosmont, to the Hereford line at Pontrilas. This would give a shorter route for minerals and bulk goods from the Forest of Dean heading north to the Midlands. The contractor Thomas Savin was behind the project. Construction began and a short tunnel was constructed at Monmouth Troy. In 1866 Savin went bankrupt and work stopped. This was followed closely by the unrelated collapse of the Overend and Gurney bank, a financial crash leading to the Panic of 1866. As this had been spurred by over-investment in speculative railway building, there was little chance of further investment in the new line.

Only the tunnel survived, in what grew to become the goods yard at Monmouth Troy. It was used for storage and to garage a delivery lorry. It survives to this day, now in the garden of a private house.

== Monmouth Troy today ==
During the construction of a building estate which would have destroyed the derelict station building, the Gloucestershire Warwickshire Railway bought it and moved the building stone-by-stone from Monmouth and rebuilt it on the restored railway. Re-construction at Winchcombe on the restored line began in 1987 and was completed in 1999; the station is now known as Winchcombe railway station.

Preceding station	Disused railways	Following station
Wyesham Halt	Wye Valley Railway; British Railways	Terminus
Wyesham Halt	Coleford Railway; Great Western Railway	Terminus
Terminus	Coleford, Monmouth, Usk and Pontypool Railway; British Railways	Dingestow
Monmouth Mayhill	Ross and Monmouth Railway; British Railways	Terminus

== See also ==
- Winchcombe railway station

== Bibliography ==
- Parkhouse, Neil (2013a). West Gloucester & Wye Valley Lines. British Railway History In Colour. Vol. 1. Lydney: Lightmoor Press. ISBN 9781899889 76 1.
