= Wyesham Halt railway station =

Former railway station in Monmouthshire, Wales

Wyesham Halt

General information
- Location: Monmouth, Monmouthshire; Wales
- Coordinates: 51.8049°N 2.7040°W
- Platforms: 1

Other information
- Status: Disused

History
- Post-grouping: Great Western Railway

Key dates
- 12 January 1931: Opened
- January 1959: Closed
Location

Wyesham Halt was a request stop on the former Wye Valley Railway serving Wyesham, just across the river from the town of Monmouth. It was opened on 12 January 1931 and closed in January 1959 when the line closed to passengers. Some freight traffic on the line continued until 1964, although that did not involve this station.

The halt was located immediately to the East of the Monmouth Viaduct, on an embankment between the River Wye and the Wye valley road, the 1829 Monmouth to Chepstow toll road. The need for a station here was unclear as Monmouth already had two stations and May Hill was also on this side of the river. Although Wyesham is now a residential suburb of Monmouth, at the time it was just a handful of houses; its development did not begin until the time of the line's closure and the edge of the housing now follows the old route of the railway.

Construction was extremely simple, with just a wooden platform and two corrugated iron huts. The starter signal for trains heading southwards was at the end of the platform, controlled from Monmouth Troy. The junction for the Coleford Branch, and its passing loop, was just to the East of modern Wyesham, but had no public access.

Little of the site remains. The bridge has been demolished and the platform built over, but the embankment to the East of the road can be traced.

== Earlier railways ==
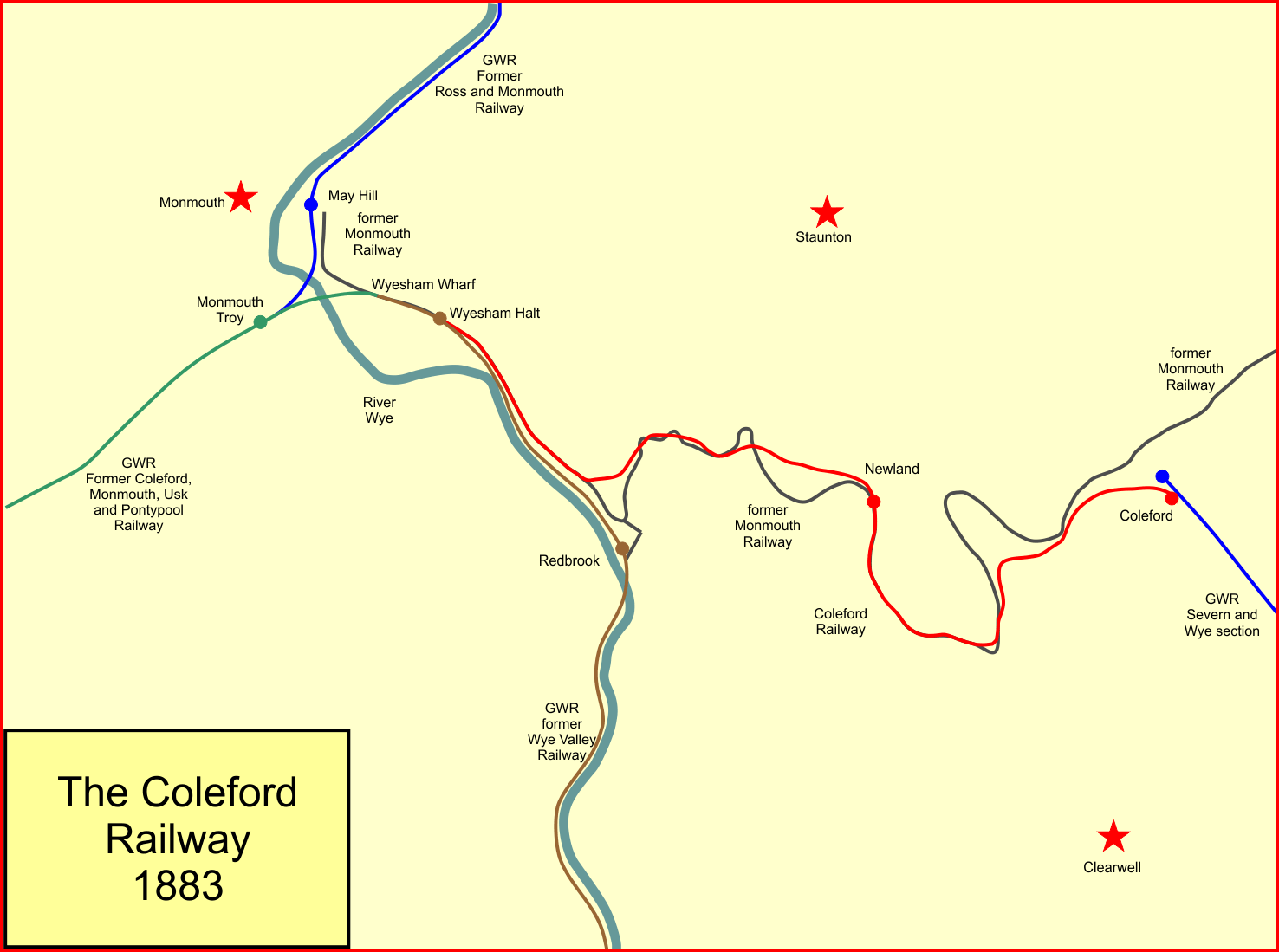
Railways around Wyesham and the stations of Monmouth

The history of railways in Wyesham is long and complicated, beginning with the Monmouth Tramroad, a plateway of 1812. This was built to carry coal from the Forest of Dean out to Monmouth and the River Wye, where it could then be loaded onto trows for carriage to Tintern, Chepstow, Bristol and Gloucester. The plateway ran through Coleford, Newland and Redbrook and down to the Wye, where it turned North and followed the river to Monmouth. This was the first rail transport into Monmouth and ran through Wyesham and a small wharf, then on to the future site of May Hill station where a sawmill and gasworks developed. The country here is steep and wooded, so the route of the plateway was much the same as that of later railways and roads, although the plateway had to make longer detours around some valleys to avoid gradients. When the Coleford Railway was constructed these loops could be straightened and Redbrook was bypassed altogether, as the Wye Valley Railway was thought to be imminent, and this gave a better route through the industries of Lower Redbrook.

The railway between Monmouth Troy and Wyesham, and its expensive stone viaduct, was originally built by the Coleford, Monmouth, Usk and Pontypool Railway in 1861. There may have been thoughts to provide a triangular junction between all three of Monmouth's stations, following the route of the 1812 plateway. This would have given a route for goods from the Forest northwards through Ross and on to the Midlands, but it was never developed. In the 1860s, plans for the Monnow Valley Railway were put forward as a fourth line into Monmouth, which would also have given a Northern route through Monmouth Troy station. Although these came to nothing, it may have been enough to disrupt the idea of a link from Wyesham to May Hill.

The Wye Valley line South of Wyesham and the Coleford junction, through to Redbrook and Tintern, was delayed by the Panic of 1866 and construction did not begin until 1874. As May Hill had opened by now, in 1873, there was no need to provide a station at Wyesham, particularly as the traffic from the Forest was expected to be predominantly goods.

Preceding station	Disused railways	Following station
Redbrook on Wye	Wye Valley Railway; British Railways	Monmouth Troy
