= Monmouth Viaduct =

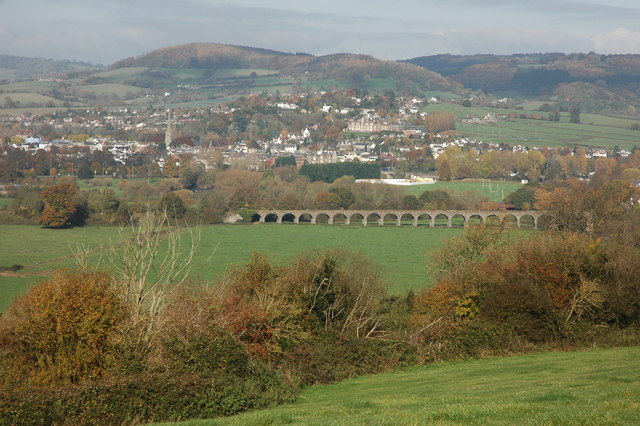
- Coordinates: 51.804475°N 2.707872°W
- Carries: Coleford, Monmouth, Usk & Pontypool Railway
- Crosses: River Wye
- Locale: Monmouth, Wales
- Other name: Chippenham Meadow Viaduct

Characteristics
- Material: Red sandstone; Steel
- Total length: 183 m (600 ft)
- Height: 50 m (160 ft)
- Longest span: 23 m (75 ft)
- No. of spans: 20

History
- Constructed by: Kennards of Crumlin
- Inaugurated: 1861
- Closed: 1964

Location
- Interactive map of Monmouth Viaduct

The Monmouth Viaduct or Chippenham Meadow Viaduct is a 20-arch, 183-metre (600 ft) red sandstone viaduct, with two 23-metre (75 ft) steel lattice-girder spans over the river. It carried the Coleford, Monmouth, Usk & Pontypool Railway line across the River Wye at Monmouth, Wales. A further river crossing by the Ross and Monmouth Railway was later built nearby.

The Coleford, Monmouth, Usk & Pontypool Railway was opened in 1857, running from Pontypool to Monmouth Troy. The single-track line was extended in 1861 to Wyesham Halt on the east side of the viaduct. The bridge which was originally planned to carry the line onwards to Coleford. However, the line terminated at Wyesham and was not extended to Coleford as the Great Western Railway and West Midland Railway did not pursue the extension. The bridge was not heavily used until 1876 when the Wye Valley Railway completed its line from Chepstow and south Wales. In 1883 the Coleford Railway was constructed from Wyesham Junction to Coleford but was closed as being uneconomical in 1916.

The viaduct was originally planned to be constructed of wood, but the 1852 floods influenced the engineers to change to stone. The building of the viaduct took exactly ten months. It contains 9,000 cubic yards (6,900 m^{3}) of masonry and 3,000 cubic yards (2,300 m^{3}) of concrete. Two arches form the 20-metre (66 ft)-long eastern element of the structure. The bridge was designed by Christopher Firbank and built by Kennards of Crumlin. It was about 50 feet (15 m) above the water and lay on two 150-foot (46 m) girders resting on the stone arches. Large crowds assembled to watch the bridge being put into place in 1861. Only the stone parts of the viaduct remain extant.

== Gallery ==
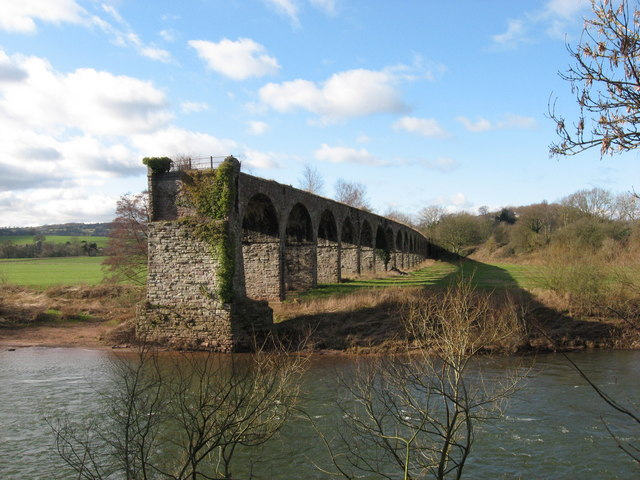
Monmouth Viaduct structure today, showing the missing river span.

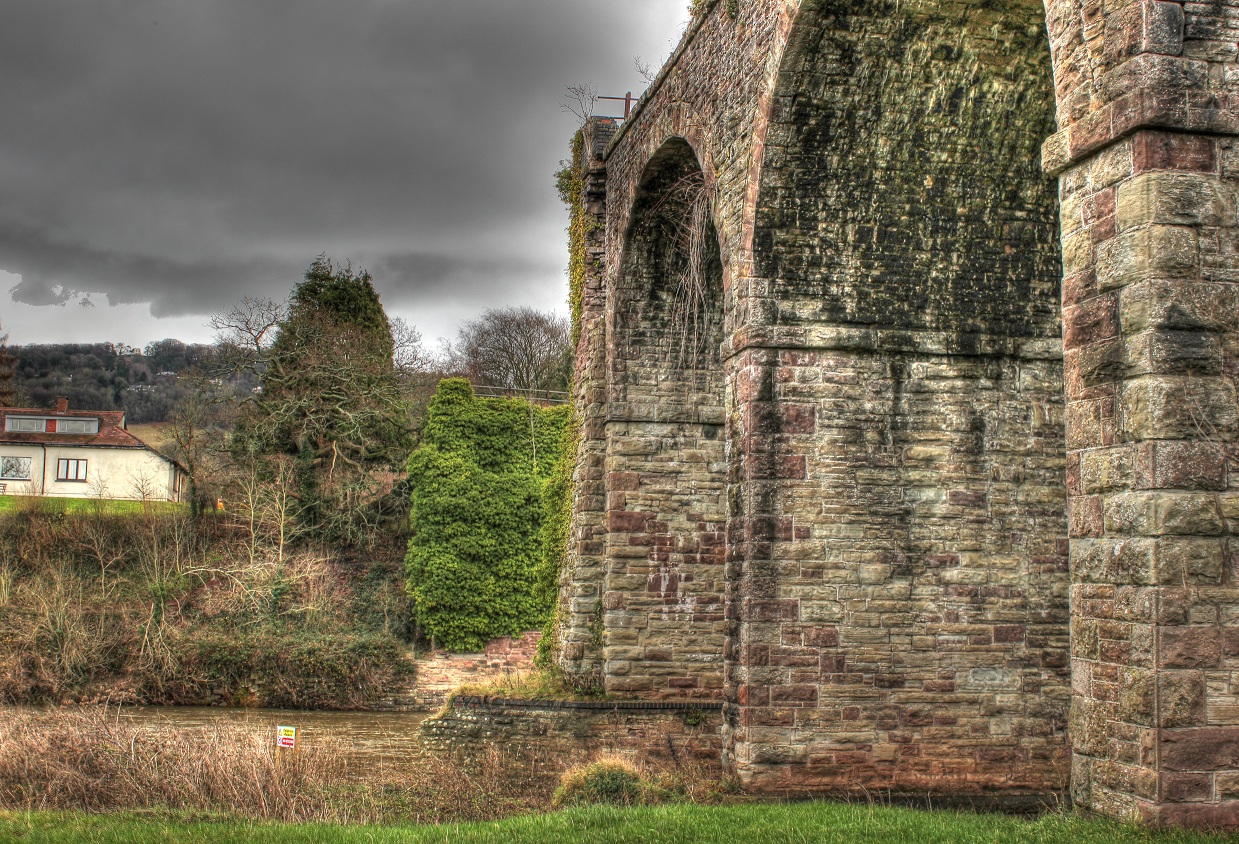
View from the viaduct across the river.

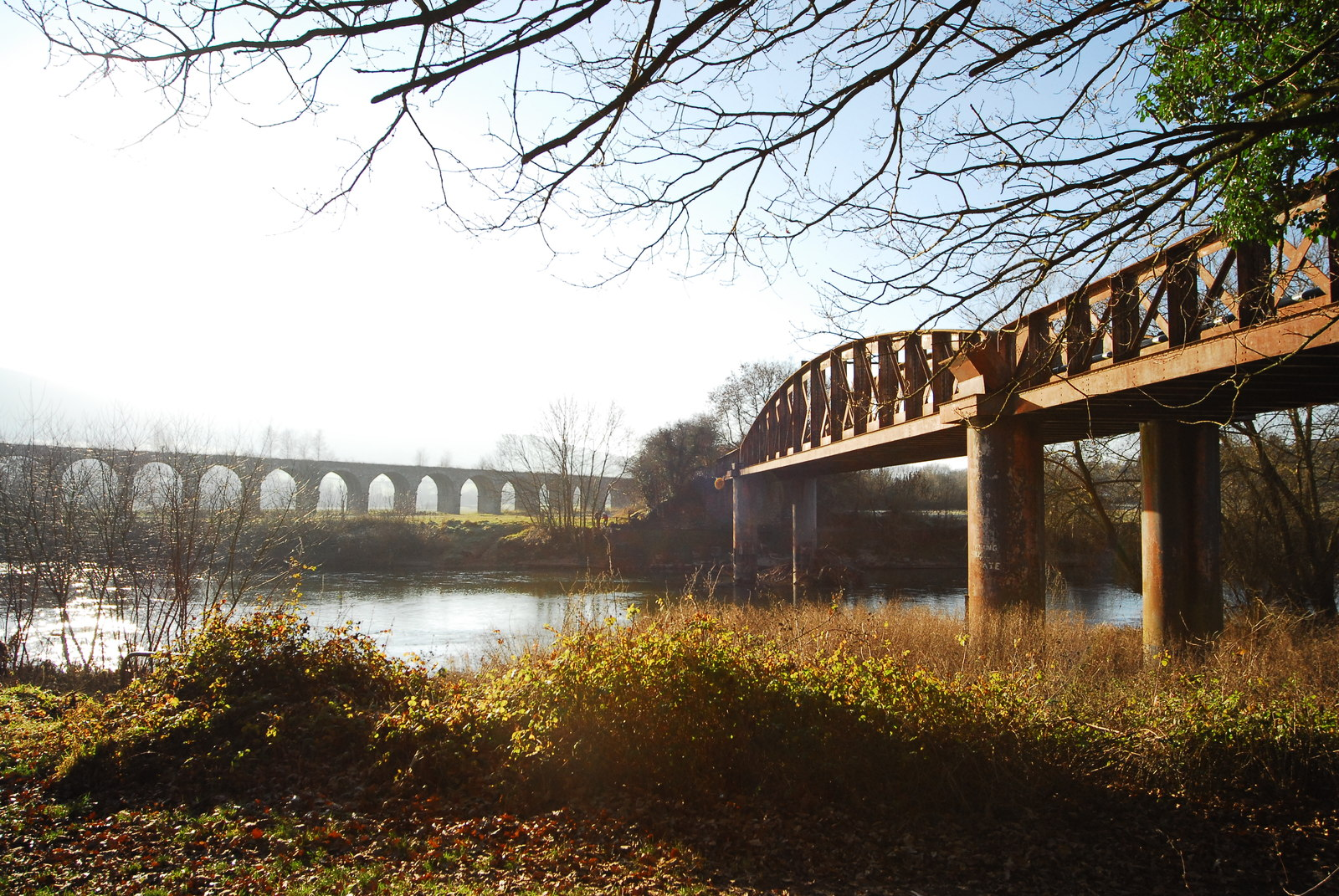
The viaduct, and Beaufort Bridge (right)

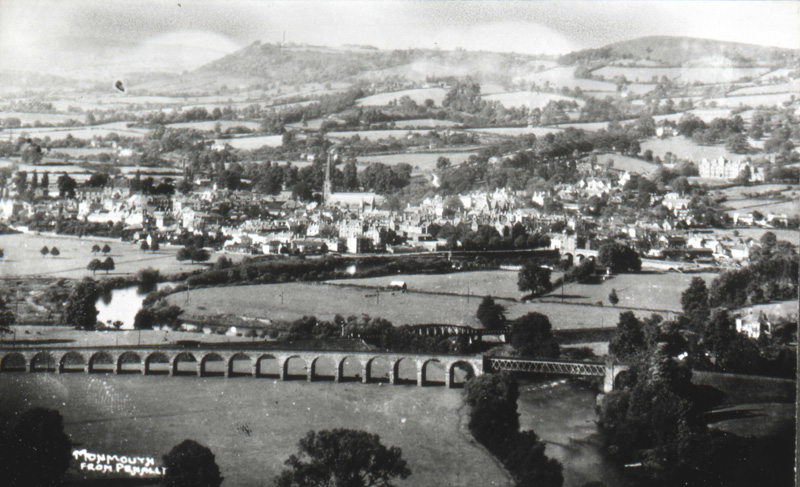
View of Monmouth from South at Penallt, with railway bridges and viaduct in the foreground.

== Duke of Beaufort Bridge ==
The Ross and Monmouth Railway line opened in 1873 terminating at Monmouth Mayhill railway station. A further single line and three-span bridge of almost 300 feet (91 m) was constructed to join the two Monmouth railway stations, opening on 1 May 1874. It consists of three spans of steel-lattice girders on paired steel tubular piers with squared rubble abutments. The main span is 46 metres (151 ft) long and the shorter spans are 18 metres (59 ft) each. It was built by Edward Finch of Chepstow.

The line between Monmouth Troy and Mayhill was closed on 6 January 1964. The R&MR Duke of Beaufort Bridge remains in use as a footpath. A Sustrans project aims to restore and redeck the bridge as part of improving local cycle connectivity.

=== Gallery ===
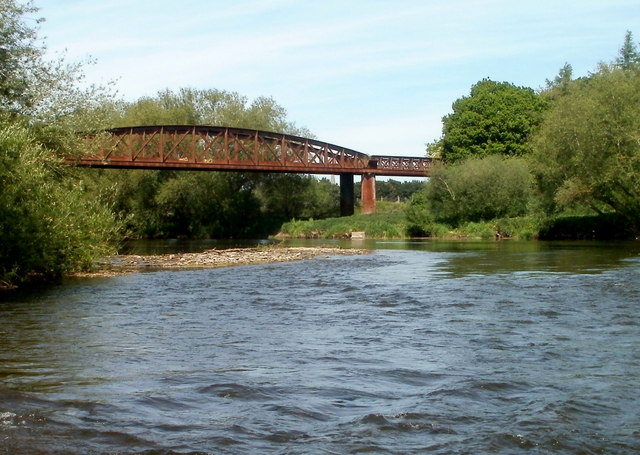
Main span of the Duke of Beaufort Bridge

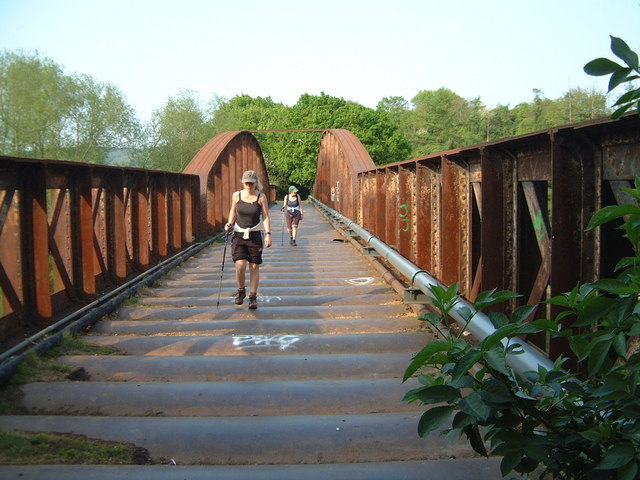
The Duke of Beaufort Bridge, now used as a footbridge.

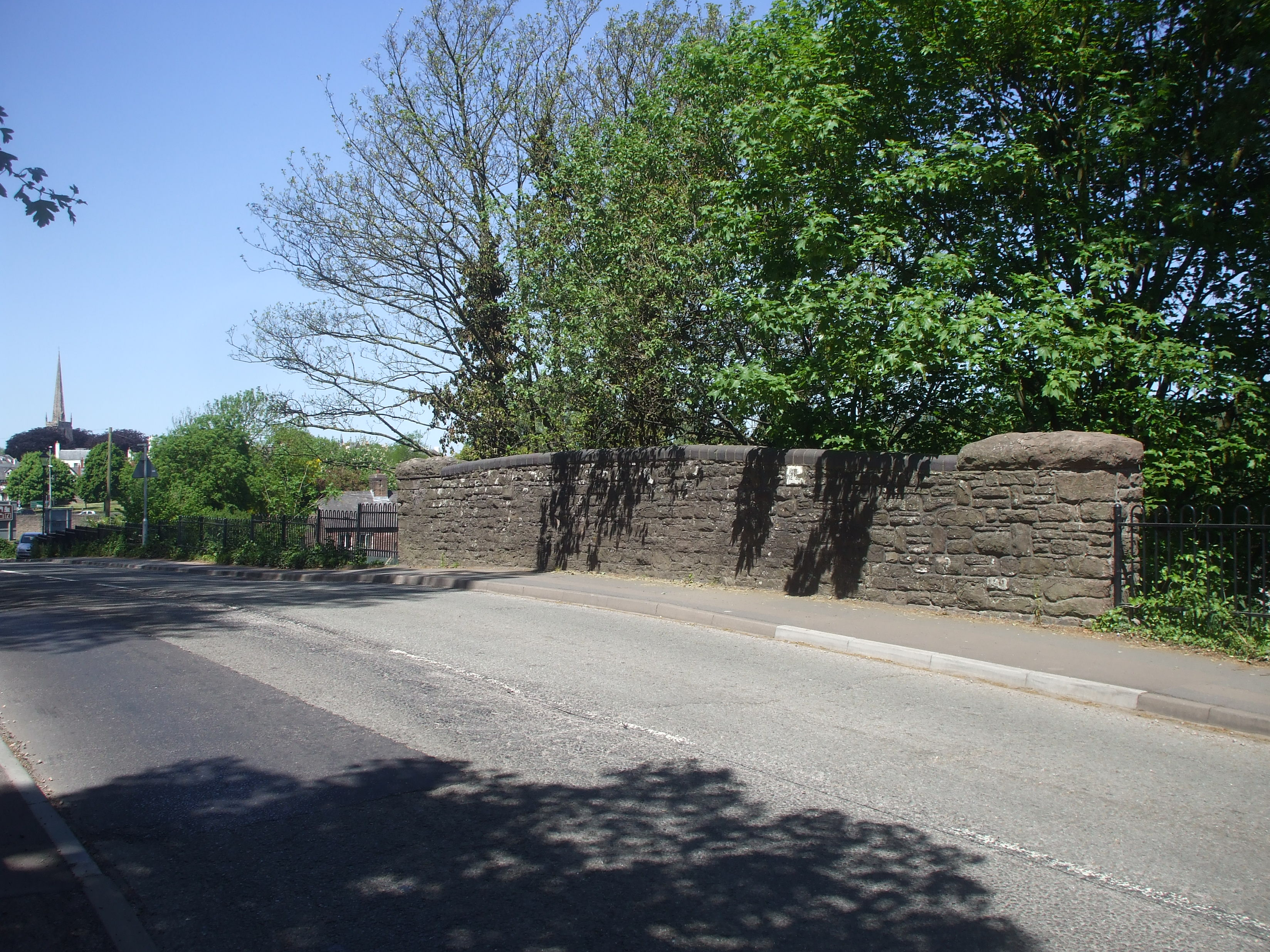
The surviving small road bridge approaching the Wye Bridge, over the line northwards to May Hill station

== See also ==
- List of crossings of the River Wye

== Sources ==
- Parkhouse, Neil (2013a). West Gloucester & Wye Valley Lines. British Railway History In Colour. Vol. 1. Lydney: Lightmoor Press. ISBN 9781899889 76 1.
