= Redbrook Incline Bridge =

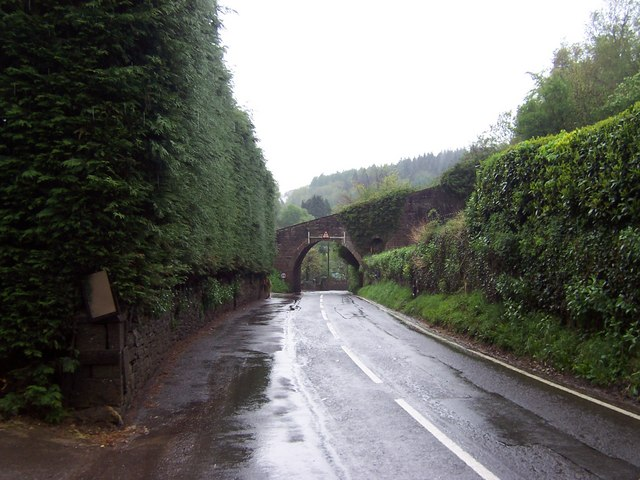
- Coordinates: 51.7892°N 2.6732°W
- Crosses: B4231 Road
- Locale: Redbrook, Gloucestershire, England / Monmouthshire, Wales

Characteristics
- Design: Tram bridge
- Material: Old Red Sandstone

History
- Construction start: 1810
- Construction end: 1812
- Closed: mid-19th century

Listed Building – Grade II*
- Official name: Redbrook Incline Bridge over B4231
- Designated: 10 August 2005
- Reference no.: 85227 (Cadw)

Listed Building – Grade II
- Official name: Incline Overbridge, at NGR SO 536102
- Designated: 24 September 1984
- Reference no.: 1299263 (Historic England)

Scheduled monument
- Official name: Redbrook Incline Overbridge
- Designated: 11 January 1978
- Reference no.: MM203 (Cadw)

Location
- Interactive map of Redbrook Incline Bridge

The Redbrook Incline Bridge is a nineteenth-century tramway bridge that crosses the B4231 road at Redbrook on the England–Wales border. The bridge straddles the border and stands in the counties of Monmouthshire in Wales and Gloucestershire in England. It was built as a branch line from the Monmouth Tramroad to transport coal to the Redbrook Tinplate Works and was constructed on a significant incline as a consequence of its standing well below the main tramway. It is separately a listed building in Wales (Grade II*) and England (Grade II) and a scheduled monument.

== Background ==
The Monmouth Railway (or Monmouth Tramroad) was a network of horse-drawn tramroads in the Wye Valley, where the River Wye forms the border between England and Wales. The lines were first laid from 1817 and converted to standard gauge from around 1856.

== History ==
The Monmouth Tramroad opened from 1812 and closed in the late 19th century. The Redbrook Incline Bridge was constructed as part of a branch line from the main tramroad to serve the Redbrook Tinplate Works. Grace's Guide to British Industrial History suggests it was also used to transport coal out of the Forest of Dean to the River Wye for onward transportation.

== Description ==
The bridge's purpose was to deliver coal to the metal works. It is constructed of Old Red Sandstone, and forms a single sloping arch. It is approximately 3.25 metres (10.7 feet) high, over the B4231 Road. The gradient of the bridge was a consequence of the works' location further down the valley than the main tramway. A circular aperture is cut into the embankment wall on the higher side and three small arches—under one of which runs a mill leat—on the lower side to distribute the load. The bridge is 6 metres (20 feet) wide and 236 metres (258 yards) long, with high parapets, the width indicating its function as a self-acting incline bridge, with two parallel rails running its length.

The bridge is a listed building in both England and Wales. It is listed at Grade II* by Cadw and at Grade II by Historic England. It is also a scheduled monument. According to Cadw, the Welsh listing authority, the bridge is of "special interest as an unusual and rare tramway bridge built on a steep incline".
