= Monmouth Railway =

Overview
- Status: Defunct
- Termini: May Hill, Monmouth, Wales 51.8114°N 2.7076°W; Howler Slade, Coleford, Gloucestershire, England 51.7872°N 2.5690°W

Service
- Type: Horse-drawn plateway

History
- Opened: 1812
- Closed: 1870s

Technical
- Line length: 5 mi (8.0 km)
- Track gauge: 3 ft 6 in (1,067 mm)

The Monmouth Railway, also known as the Monmouth Tramroad, was a horse-drawn 3 ft 6 in (1,067 mm) gauge plateway. It ran for about 5 miles (8.0 km) from Howler's Slade, east of Coleford, in Gloucestershire and Monmouth; there were two branches from other mineral sites. It was intended to bring the mineral products, coal and iron ore, of the Forest of Dean to Monmouth, and to a wharf alongside the River Wye.

It was opened from 1812 and for some time was the only railway at Monmouth. From 1853 technologically superior edge railways were built serving the area, and the Monmouth Railway declined and became dormant. It finally closed in the 1870s. It was purchased by the Coleford Railway, which used part of its alignment to build its line from Monmouth to Coleford, which opened in 1883.

Some fragments of bridge structures and a short tunnel survive at present, and part of the route can be surmised from aerial photographs.

== Background ==
The Forest of Dean had long been a productive source of minerals, but the difficult terrain and the poor quality of the road network made transportation to market expensive. Coal deposits were located at Howler's Slade, near Cannop Hill east of Coleford, and there were numerous other coal pits, iron ore deposits and stone quarries in the area. Primitive tramroads had been made in many locations in the Forest for short distance transport, generally reserved to the exclusive use of the mine operators.

Monmouth was five miles west of the Forest of Dean, but the poor transport facilities kept the price of coal in the town high. In 1802, a 2-ton wagon load cost upwards of 28 shillings. 10 wagons and carts and 300 horses and mules were constantly in use bringing coal to the town in 1802.

In 1807 and again in 1808, a railway or tramroad connection was proposed, and at the end of 1808 a wagon ferry at Redbrook was suggested.

In September 1809, an engineer, Astley Bowdler, presented plans for a railway; his estimate for the construction was £20,384, including land acquisition.

In the Forest of Dean, special rights of mineral extraction were reserved for Free Miners, but this had the effect of preventing large scale investment by external companies. However, in 1808 David Mushet, a Scottish metallurgist, became involved. Thomas Halford was the owner of ironworks at Whitecliff, and he brought Mushet in to improve the quality of the iron produced there.

The improved quality stimulated demand for local iron ore and coal, and emphasised the poor quality of the transport facilities locally, and Mushet was involved in the promotion of the railway as an aid to the efficiency of the metal industry.

In 1821, Monmouth had a population of some 4,200 and, apart from being an important centre for a large country district, had several iron-foundries and paper-mills within a few miles.

== The Monmouth Railway authorised ==
Monmouth Railway Act 1810
- Act of Parliament
- Parliament of the United Kingdom
- Long title: An Act for making and maintaining a Railway from Howler Slade in the Forest of Dean, in the County of Gloucester, to the Town of Monmouth; and for making other Railways therein mentioning in the Counties of Gloucester and Monmouth.
- Citation: 50 Geo. 3. c. cxxiii

Dates
- Royal assent: 24 May 1810

Text of statute as originally enacted

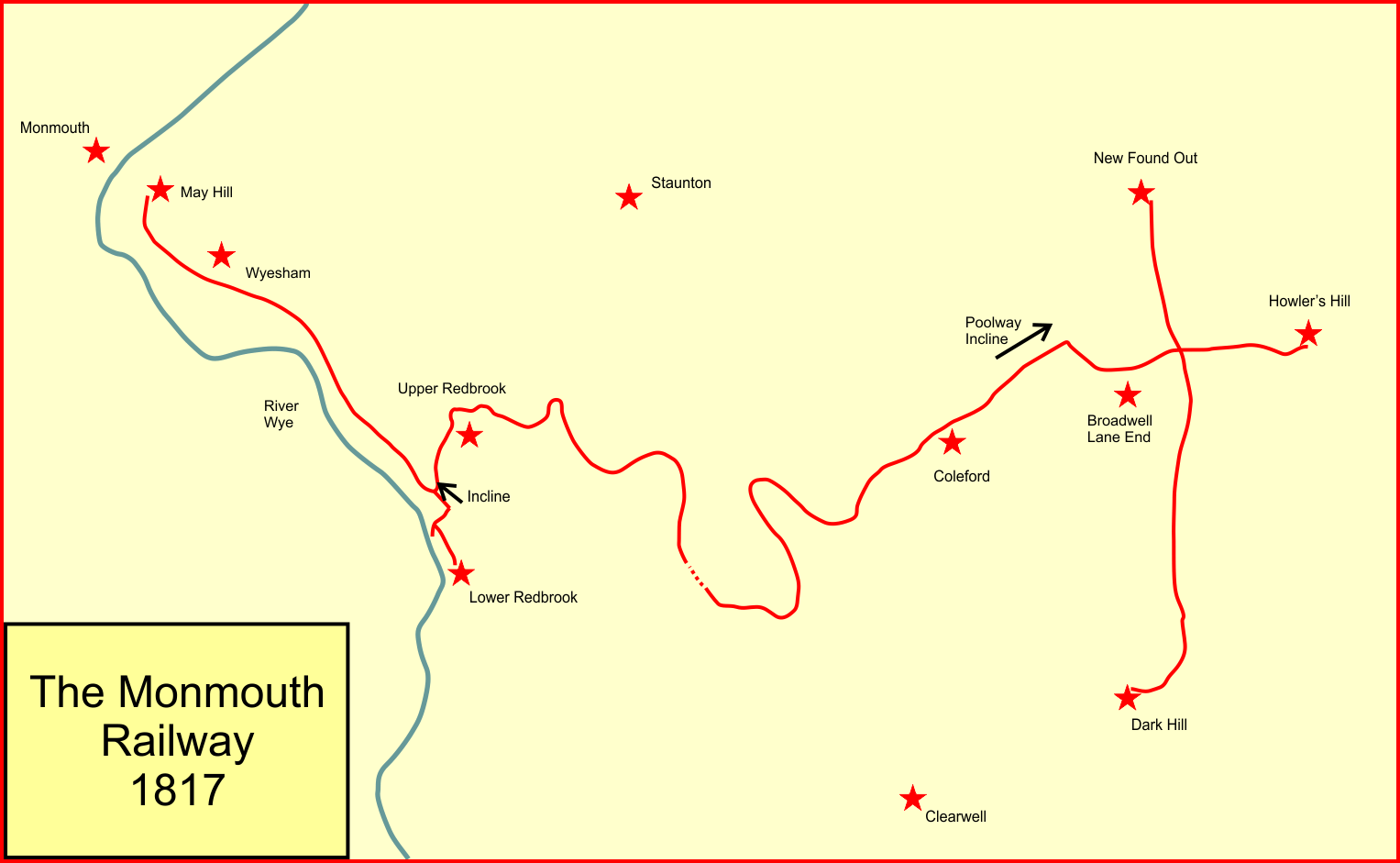
Monmouth rly

On 24 May 1810, a public tramroad, the Monmouth Railway, was authorised by Parliament in the Monmouth Railway Act 1810 (50 Geo. 3. c. cxxiii); its capital was £22,000 with borrowing powers of £6,000. The line was to be a "railway or tramroad" from Howler Slade to the May Hill district of Monmouth, on the east side of the River Wye, across from the central part of the town. The line was to run near Coleford, Newland and Redbrook to reach Monmouth. An extension was authorised to reach the Nag's Head Inn in the town centre near Dixon Gate; this would cross the Wye Bridge at Monmouth, or alternatively reach the town by "passing the river itself by a boat". Several branches were authorised; as well as short connections to mines and quarries close to the proposed main line, there was a longer southward branch from Broadwell Lane End to Darkhill, and northward to New Thatch pit. In addition there was to be another crossing of the River Wye at Newland to Pool Dee in Penallt parish. This last, and the river crossing in Monmouth, were not built.

The line was to be a toll road, in which the track was provided by the company, and common carriers could run their horse-drawn vehicles on it for a toll charge. The tolls were laid down in the act, and 6d per mile was chargeable "for every Carriage conveying passengers". This is one of the earliest authorising acts in which passenger conveyance is identified, although there is no evidence that passengers were carried on a regular basis. It was built as a plateway, in which horse-drawn wagons with plain wheels ran on L-section flanged cast-iron rails; the track gauge was 3 ft 6in. There was a self-acting incline at Poolway, near Coleford, and another on a branch line, descending to the river bank at Redbrook. As the dominant traffic was minerals coming down from the hills, loaded wagons descending could haul empty wagons going up.

Horse operation required as far as possible a steady downward gradient (except at the inclines), while smooth curvature was unimportant. Major earthworks were avoided as far as possible, although a short tunnel was built near Newland. Following contours, the line made some considerable loops and diversions in order to maintain the gentle downgrade.

The order of construction was stipulated in the act; first the connection between the pits within the forest was to be completed. Then the connection to Wyesham, near Monmouth was to be made. Finally the extension to May Hill, in effect the Monmouth terminal, could be built.

The principal freight to be carried to Monmouth was coal, clay and lime, although tinworks were also connected.

== Opening ==
The opening day for the first part of the line, the Forest section, was 17 August 1812:

On Monday last 17th August, the Rail-road from the Forest of Dean to Monmouth was opened. A great number of waggons, laden with coal, lime, paving-stone, and other productions of the forest, followed a procession of thousands of people, accompanied by flags and a band of music. A numerous company afterwards met at the Beaufort Arms Inn, where a most excellent dinner was provided on the occasion.

Some references quote an opening date of 1816 or 1817; this may refer to the opening of certain branches, although the eastern branch, to Howler's Slade, did not open until 1852.

"The Eastern Branch was clearly intended to be the main stem in the Forest, for Howler's Slade was the only place in the Forest named in the estimate. There is little doubt, however, that such a line was not built for 40 years..."

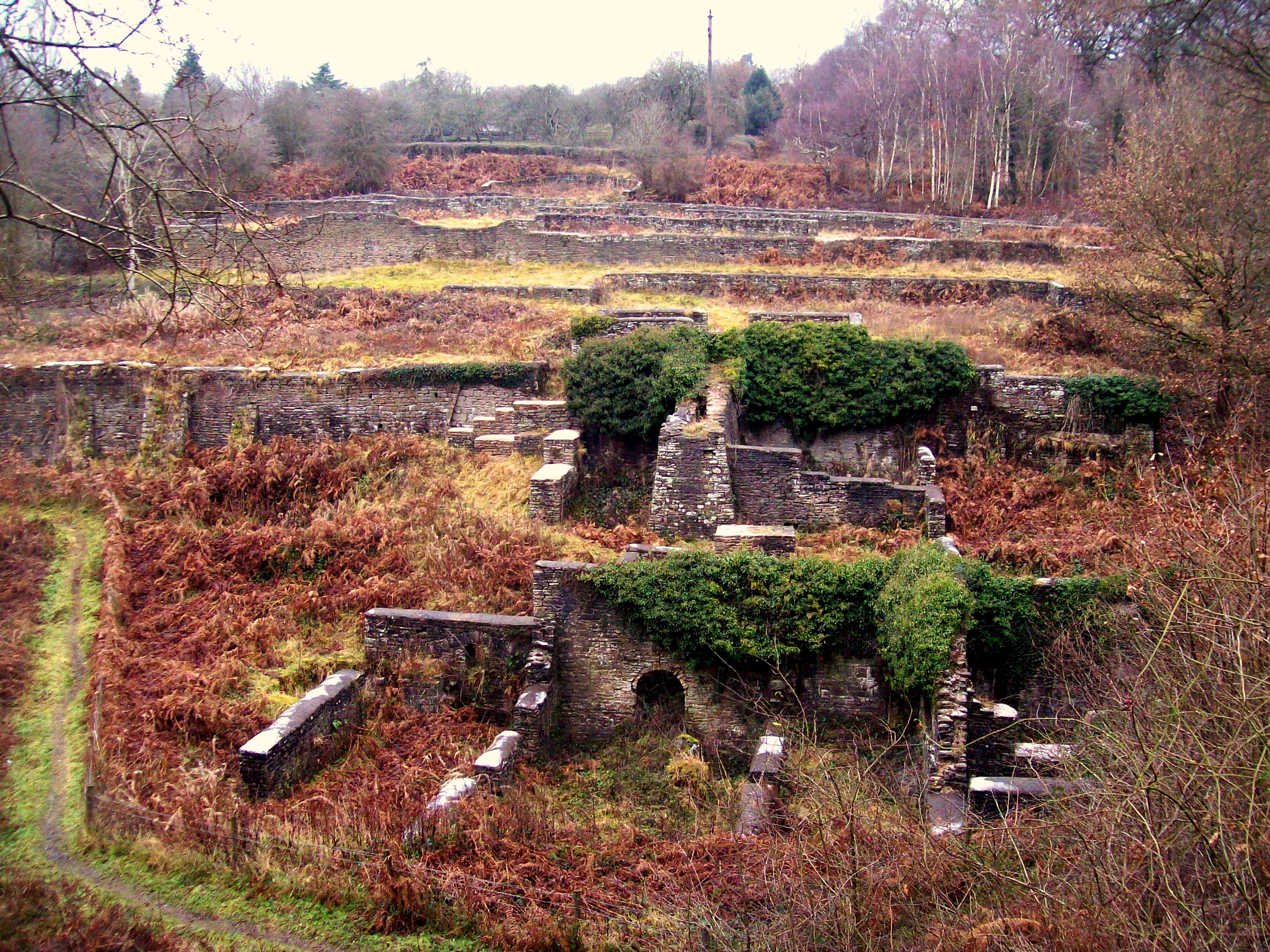
Remains of Darkhill Ironworks.

The facility to transport heavy materials encouraged local production, and in 1818 Mushet developed Darkhill Ironworks, which became a large operation. The southward branch of the Monmouth Railway penetrated as far as Darkhill.

== Operation ==
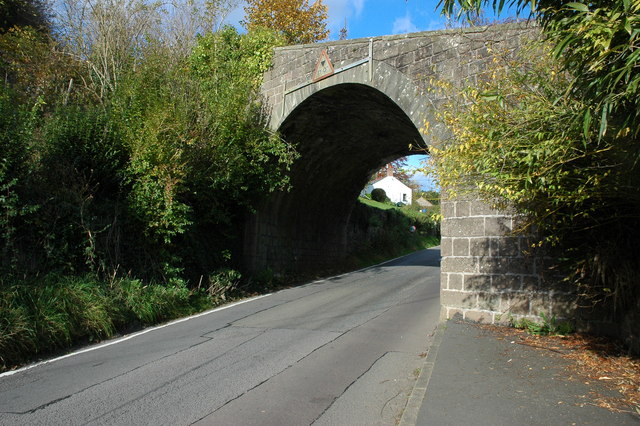
Incline bridge at Redbrook

Little is recorded about the operation of the Monmouth Railway. As a horse-operated plateway, and with two self-acting inclines on the line, it was overtaken by technological progress as edge railways came to be commonplace. The prospectus for the South Wales Railway issued in 1844 showed that the future included long distance locomotive-operated railways. The South Wales Railway was opened in stages from 1850.

After 1850, the usual load on the Howler's Slade—Monmouth line consisted of six wagons, drawn by six horses, under the control of four men. On downhill stretches drags, or shoes chained to the frame, were used to sledge the wheels.

There was a two-way traffic in a variety of goods, including bricks. Coleford had a population of about 1,800. A directory of 1830 mentioned that coals were brought from the Forest to Monmouth 'by means of a railroad, and sold at reasonable prices', and the line was used largely for minerals and heavy products.

The terminal at May Hill served the town of Monmouth, but minerals destined for the main part of the town had to be carted across the Wye Bridge. The descent to the riverside at Redbrook was intended to reach the tinworks there, but there was a wharf for traffic destined for river transport.

== Coleford, Monmouth, Usk and Pontypool Railway ==
Coleford was the most important industrial centre in the Forest of Dean, (the "capital" of the forest, although strictly speaking just outside its boundary) and on 20 August 1853 the Coleford, Monmouth, Usk and Pontypool Railway was authorised by the Coleford, Monmouth, Usk and Pontypool Railway Act 1853 (16 & 17 Vict. c. ccxvii), with the intention of conveying iron ore to the ironworks of South Wales. Coleford would be reached by taking over the Monmouth Railway and converting it to locomotive operation.

The sale of the portion of the Monmouth Railway between Coleford and Monmouth, took place on 4 February 1853, for £11,060. For the time being the Monmouth Railway management continued to operate the line.

The CMU&PR opened its line from Little Mill, near Pontypool to Usk on 2 June 1856, and onward to Monmouth Troy station on 12 October 1857. Troy station was on the south side of the town and a mile from the May Hill terminal of the Monmouth Railway. It reached Troy on 12 October 1857.

The CMU&PR still wished to reach Coleford, but the cost of conversion of the Monmouth Railway was for some time beyond its means, and a gap remained across the River Wye at Monmouth. The gap did nothing to encourage through traffic between the two systems, and as a horse-drawn toll plateway, the Monmouth Railway was already technologically obsolescent. Edge railways were carrying the mineral products to market, although it was not until 1872 that the Severn and Wye Railway reached Coleford and served the Darkhill ironworks.

The CMU&PR saw that its only chance of becoming profitable was securing the transport of iron ore from the forest, and this would not happen while the two systems, the former Monmouth Railway and the CMU&PR main line were disconnected. It was decided in September 1858 to extend the CMU&PR over the River Wye and down the valley for about two miles to Redbrook, and to make a transfer point there. Thus a considerable viaduct over the Wye at Monmouth would be undertaken. At a board meeting in December 1858, the decision was taken to provide wrought-iron tramway plates on the Monmouth Railway section, adequate for locomotives. Joseph Firbank was the contractor selected to build the bridge, and in January 1860 the board resolved that they would convert the tramroad to an edge railway, and flatten the worst of the curves for locomotive operation.

In November 1860 the decision was taken to convert the tramroad to a railway as far as Cherry Orchard, near Newland. In February 1861 the viaduct was reported to have been completed and the extension across the Wye to an interchange point at Wyesham was opened on 1 July 1861. The Monmouth Railway line was at a higher level and minerals were tipped down into CPMU&R wagons. It is doubtful if any serious work was done to improve the tramroad as, in August 1863, it was resolved to return 'the tramplates at Monmouth' to the suppliers.

On 1 July 1861 the CMU&PR was leased by the West Midland Railway. The WMR needed to bring together an uncoordinated group of lines, and any expenditure at Coleford was a very low priority. On 24 February 1866 the section of the Monmouth Railway under the control of the former CMU&PR was legally transferred.

In fact the West Midland Railway, and its successor the Great Western Railway which absorbed it in 1863, took little interest in the Monmouth Railway, and the Monmouth company continued to do what was necessary to sustain operation on its line until late 1871, at which point the GWR had some difficulty in regaining legal possession of it.

== Coleford Railway ==
Numerous railways had been constructed around the Forest but Coleford still relied on the tramroad of the Monmouth Railway.

In 1872 the GWR sponsored a local company, which sought powers for the construction of a single line from the CMU&PR at Wyesham to Coleford, with extensions to Corse Hill, and a terminus near Flour Mill colliery via Drybrook. The plans were prepared by Edward Wilson, and his estimate came to £83,169, including £3,800 for enlarging Newland tunnel. The Severn and Wye Railway opposed this in Parliament, and introduced its own bill for reconstructing the Milkwall tramroad and extending it to Coleford from Parkend. The Monmouth Railway Company also opposed the bill and refused to entertain a proposed interchange at Coleford, in the hope of forcing the newcomer to purchase its tramroad east of there.

Giving evidence in Parliament concerning the Coleford Railway Bill, a man called Lückes said that his company sent considerable quantities of coal from iron mines near Coleford, but had to cart it by road to Monmouth because "the GWR have let the tramway get into such a bad state".

The Coleford Railway Company was incorporated by the Coleford Railway Act 1872 (35 & 36 Vict. c. cxx) of 18 July 1872.

On 1 November 1876 the connecting Wye Valley Railway was opened, from the Wyesham terminus of the CMU&PR line southward to Wye Valley Jen on the South Wales line, some 13 miles. Monmouth had been provided with railway access from the north on 4 August 1873, by the opening of the Ross and Monmouth Railway, worked by the GWR.

Darkhill was by now served by the Coleford branch of the Severn and Wye Railway, opened in 1875.

The Coleford Railway opened on 1 September 1883, from a junction with the Wye Valley Railway at Wyesham. Both the Coleford Railway and the Wye Valley Railway were worked by the Great Western Railway.

== Ross and Monmouth Railway ==
The Ross and Monmouth Railway opened on 4 August 1873, entering Monmouth from the north to a terminus at May Hill. This was not immediately adjacent to the Monmouth Railway's terminal, and there is no evidence that direct exchange facilities were established. The company was continuing the line to Troy station to connect with the Pontypool line, but there was a delay in completing the bridge over the River Wye: the connecting link was opened on 1 May 1874. (Note: Christiansen, in Regional History, page 131, implies that it was the Pontypool company which crossed the Wye: The CMU&PR reached Monmouth (Troy) on 12 October 1857. "Money was short, but a viaduct was built across the Wye so that traffic could be transshipped at Wyesham Wharf from 1 July 1861." Christiansen does not say to or from which transport medium the transshipment took place. Jenkins, pages 23 and 24, makes it clear that it was the Ross and Monmouth Railway which completed the crossing: "[on] 1st May 1874, the railway was belatedly extended... from its original terminus at Monmouth (May Hill) to the Coleford, Monmouth Usk & Pontypool station at Monmouth Troy.")

A further line was built, connecting Monmouth: the Wye Valley Railway ran southward from Monmouth Troy station to Chepstow through the lower Wye Valley; it opened on 1 November 1876 after a lengthy construction period, which was due to the difficulty of raising capital.

== End of the Monmouth Railway ==
The Monmouth tramroad was in poor shape by 1872 and it is doubtful if any significant traffic passed thereafter. On 27 March 1874, the directors agreed to accept £1,000 from the Coleford Railway for the tramroad east of Coleford, but the price had dropped to £900 by 14 January 1876, when a special general meeting was held to seal the contract of sale. After this meeting the company took no further action, and by 1880 the track had been removed by the GWR.

== Route ==
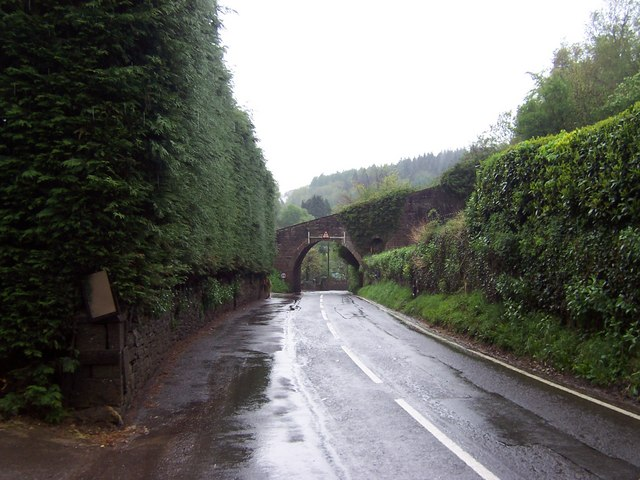
The (disused) Incline Bridge at Redbrook

The main line ran from Howler's Slade, east of Coleford, through Broadwell, then down the Poolway incline and through the town of Coleford. The railway then led west down the valley past Whitecliff Ironworks and through a tunnel above Newland.

At Redbrook the main line made a sharp turn to the north, gradually descending the hillside parallel to the River Wye. The terminus was at May Hill, near Monmouth Bridge.

There was a branch at Redbrook: a steep incline led down to the village, providing access to the two tinplate works there. Branches from Broadwell led north to the New Found Out coal mine, and south to the Darkhill Ironworks.

== Remnants ==
Much of the tramroad was obliterated when the later railway was built, but a number of remnants can be found. The Redbrook Incline Bridge over the B4231 road at Redbrook (SO537102) is now protected as a scheduled monument. Near Coleford, the stone abutments of a former wooden bridge exist either side of a minor road at SO563101. (Note: Near High Meadow Farm; note this is not the intact stone arch bridge, which was for the later Coleford Railway.) A section of the original tramroad tunnel remains on private land near Newland. The body of a carriage, known as the "Littleworth Coach", believed to have been built for the Monmouth Railway in 1848, is preserved at Buckfastleigh on the South Devon Railway.
