= Coleford Great Western Railway Museum =

Railway museum in Coleford, England

Coordinates: 51.792°N 2.615°W

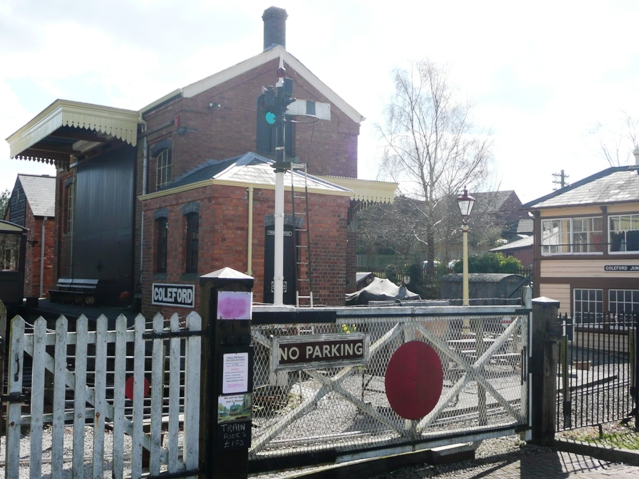
Coleford GWR Museum

Coleford Great Western Railway Museum is a railway museum located in Coleford, Gloucestershire, England. The museum was founded in 1988. Based in the former GWR Goods Shed along the Coleford Railway. There was also another station situated at Coleford, it was opened by the Severn and Wye Railway. The Museum traces the history of all the railways in the Forest of Dean, Gloucestershire from the early 19th century when the first plateways were laid, to the 1970s when the Dean Forest Railway was founded. The Museum has information about the Wye Valley Railway, Severn and Wye Railway and Monmouth Troy railway station.

It consists of the former goods shed, a GWR signal box, a miniature railway, and a short stretch of track on which a Peckett 0-4-0ST locomotive, no. 1893, stands with ex-GWR rolling stock.
