= Offa's Country =

England and Wales tourism project

Offa's Country is a sustainable tourism project developed under the 2009 Welsh-English Border Strategic Regeneration Programme. The programme is funded by the Welsh Government, Natural England and Advantage West Midlands. Partnerships have been developed between the bodies responsible for the four protected landscapes along a corridor including the administrative border and Offa's Dyke itself, namely Brecon Beacons National Park, Clwydian Range AONB, Shropshire Hills AONB and the Wye Valley AONB together with the Offa's Dyke National Trail. Various other local and quasi-governmental bodies from either side of the border are also involved.

The first phase of the project, encouraging more walking tourism, was Walking with Offa, launched in October 2011 at the Offa's Dyke Centre in Knighton, Powys.
