= Monmouth Gasworks =

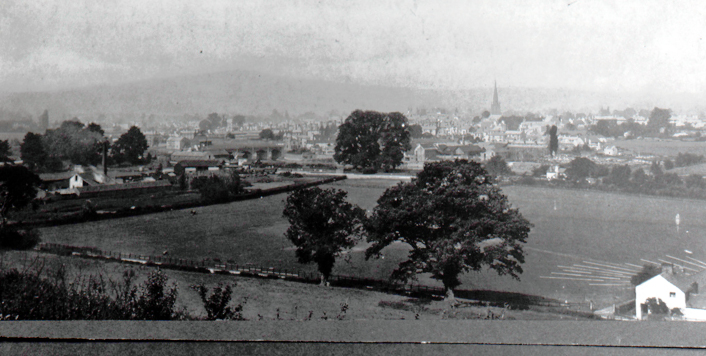
- Monmouth in 1900 with gasworks in foreground
- Interactive map of the Monmouth Gasworks area
- Former names: Monmouth Gas and Water Co. Ltd

General information
- Location: May Hill, Monmouth, Wales
- Coordinates: 51.8107°N 2.7058°W
- Completed: 1846

Monmouth Gasworks was the facility for making town gas in Monmouth, Wales. The gasworks had its coal delivered by the Coleford, Monmouth, Usk and Pontypool Railway and was frequented by Charles Rolls to fill up his balloon.

== History ==
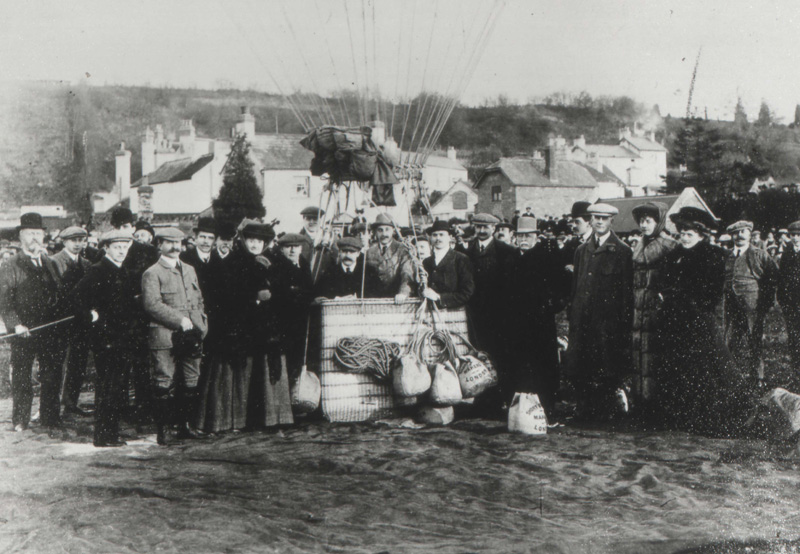
Rolls with his mother and father at the gasworks

The site was set up in 1838 when the Monmouth Gas and Water Company was founded and the land leased for the site from the Duke of Beaufort at the foot of the May Hill between Monmouth Town and Wyesham near Monmouth Mayhill railway station. In the 1860s a number of railways were built in the area, which improved on the existing tramways. A special branch line of the Coleford, Monmouth, Usk and Pontypool Railway served the gas works at Wyesham. The company's prime source of revenue at that time was the water side of the business. The gas part of the business supplied fuel for street and private lighting to the town.

Until the 1930s the gas works were operated by the Monmouth Gas and Water Co. Ltd. The gas was manufactured from coal that was brought by railway. From some time before the Second World War, this gas works was owned along with other gas plants at Ross-on-Wye, Caldicot and Caerleon by the Severn Valley Gas Corporation.

In the early twentieth century the gasworks was used by Charles Stewart Rolls, who had already co-founded Rolls-Royce Ltd and whose interest had turned to aviation. He was a founding member of the Royal Aero Club who were initially balloonists. Rolls, whose family lived near Monmouth, would travel to these gas works to have his balloon filled with gas.

The site ceased to be used as a gasworks sometime after 1960.

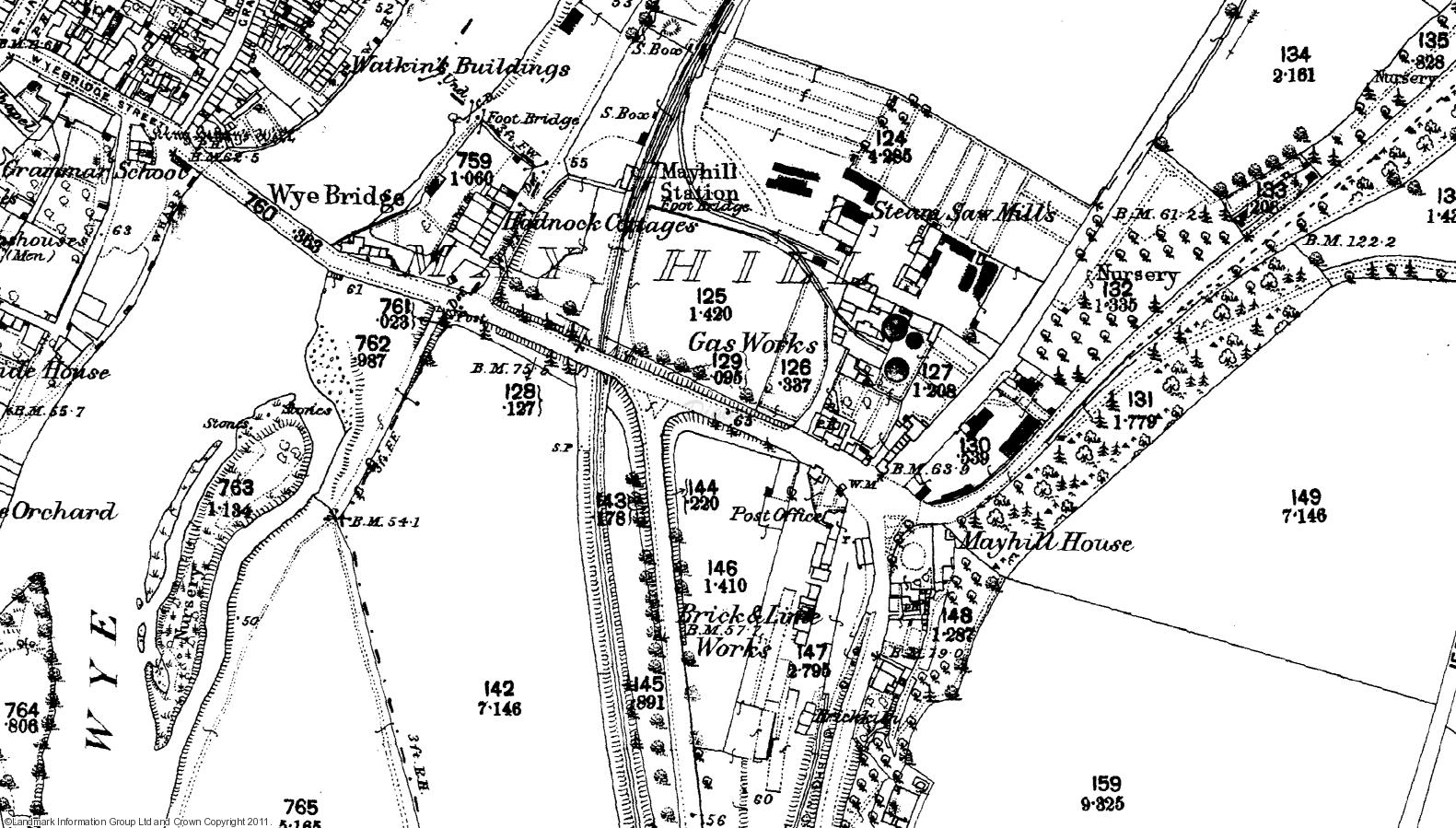
OS Map of Gasworks in Monmouth 1880
