= Newland railway station =

Disused railway station in Newland, Gloucestershire

Newland
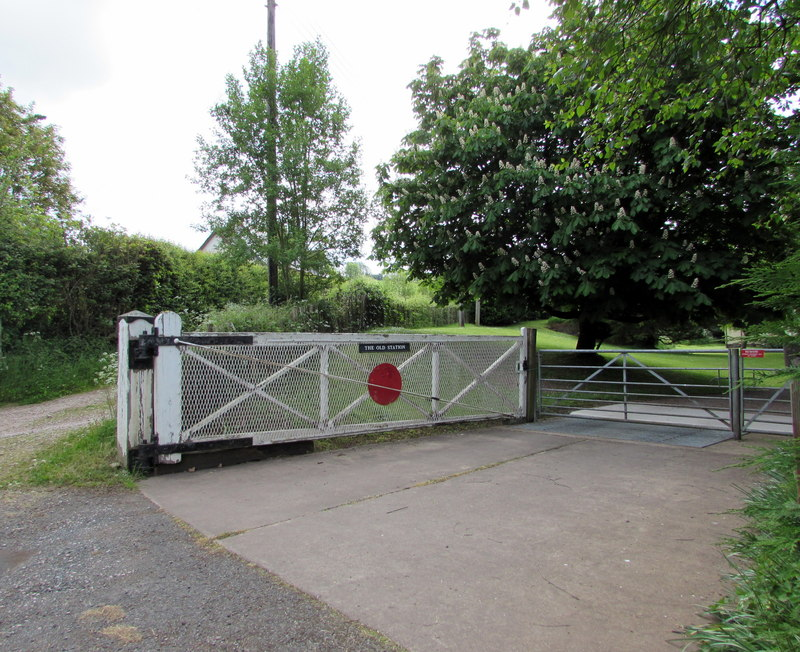
- Level crossing gate from Scowles Road, at the North of the station

General information
- Location: Newland, Gloucestershire; England
- Coordinates: 51.790706°N 2.647107°W
- Platforms: 2

Other information
- Status: Disused

History
- Original company: Great Western Railway
- Pre-grouping: Great Western Railway

Key dates
- 1 September 1883: Opened
- 1 January 1917: Closed
Location

Newland railway station, also known as Cherry Orchard station after the nearby farm, served the village of Newland, Gloucestershire, England, from 1883 to 1917 on the Coleford Railway.

== History ==
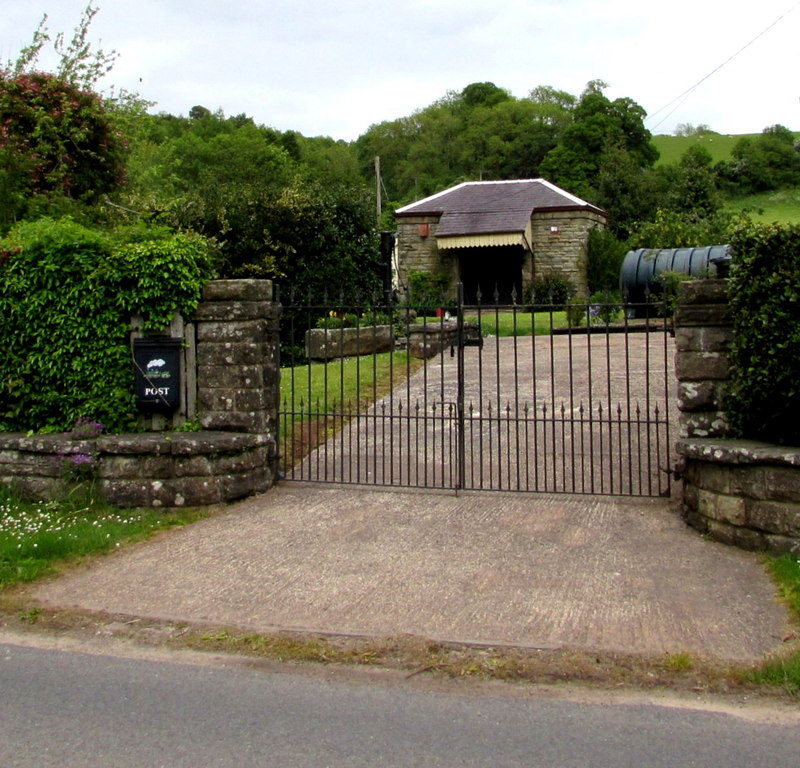
Surviving goods shed building

The station was opened on 1 September 1883 by the Great Western Railway. It closed along with the line on 1 January 1917.

Preceding station	Disused railways	Following station
Coleford; Line and station closed	Great Western Railway; Coleford Railway	Monmouth Troy; Line and station closed
