= Whitecliff Quarry =

Coordinates: 51.7897°N 2.6318°W

Whitecliff Quarry was a quarry in the Forest of Dean, Gloucestershire, England. It was served by the Coleford Railway from 1883 to 1917 and the Severn and Wye Railway from 1917 until its closure in 1976. The quarry was near the town of Coleford.
