= Coleford railway station (Coleford Railway) =

Disused railway station in Coleford, Gloucestershire

Coleford

General information
- Location: Coleford, Gloucestershire; England
- Coordinates: 51.791917°N 2.615342°W
- Platforms: 2

Other information
- Status: Disused

History
- Original company: Great Western Railway
- Pre-grouping: Great Western Railway

Key dates
- 1 September 1883: Opened
- 1 January 1917: Closed
Location

Coleford railway station served the town of Coleford, Gloucestershire, England, from 1883 to 1917 on the Coleford Railway.

== History ==
The station was opened on 1 September 1883 by the Great Western Railway. It closed along with the line on 1 January 1917.

Preceding station	Disused railways	Following station
Terminus	Great Western Railway; Coleford Railway	Newland; Line and station closed
