= Devil's Pulpit, Gloucestershire =

Rocky limestone outcrop and scenic viewpoint in Gloucestershire

Coordinates: 51.6924°N 2.6626°W

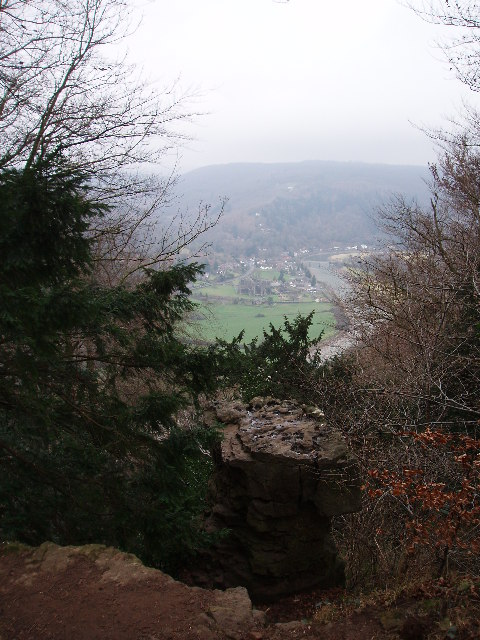
The Devil's Pulpit

The Devil's Pulpit is a rocky limestone outcrop and scenic viewpoint in the Forest of Dean District of Gloucestershire, England, within the Wye Valley Area of Outstanding Natural Beauty. It is known for its views across the River Wye to Tintern Abbey, which stands on the opposite bank in Monmouthshire, Wales.

Access is from the Offa's Dyke Path, and the site is close to the Offa's Dyke earthwork itself. It is possible to climb up onto the flat plateau of the rock, which can accommodate a few people. In the hollow behind the rock lies an ancient yew tree, its roots grown into and around a pile of stone.

Legend holds that from here the devil would taunt the monks and occupants of Tintern Abbey below.

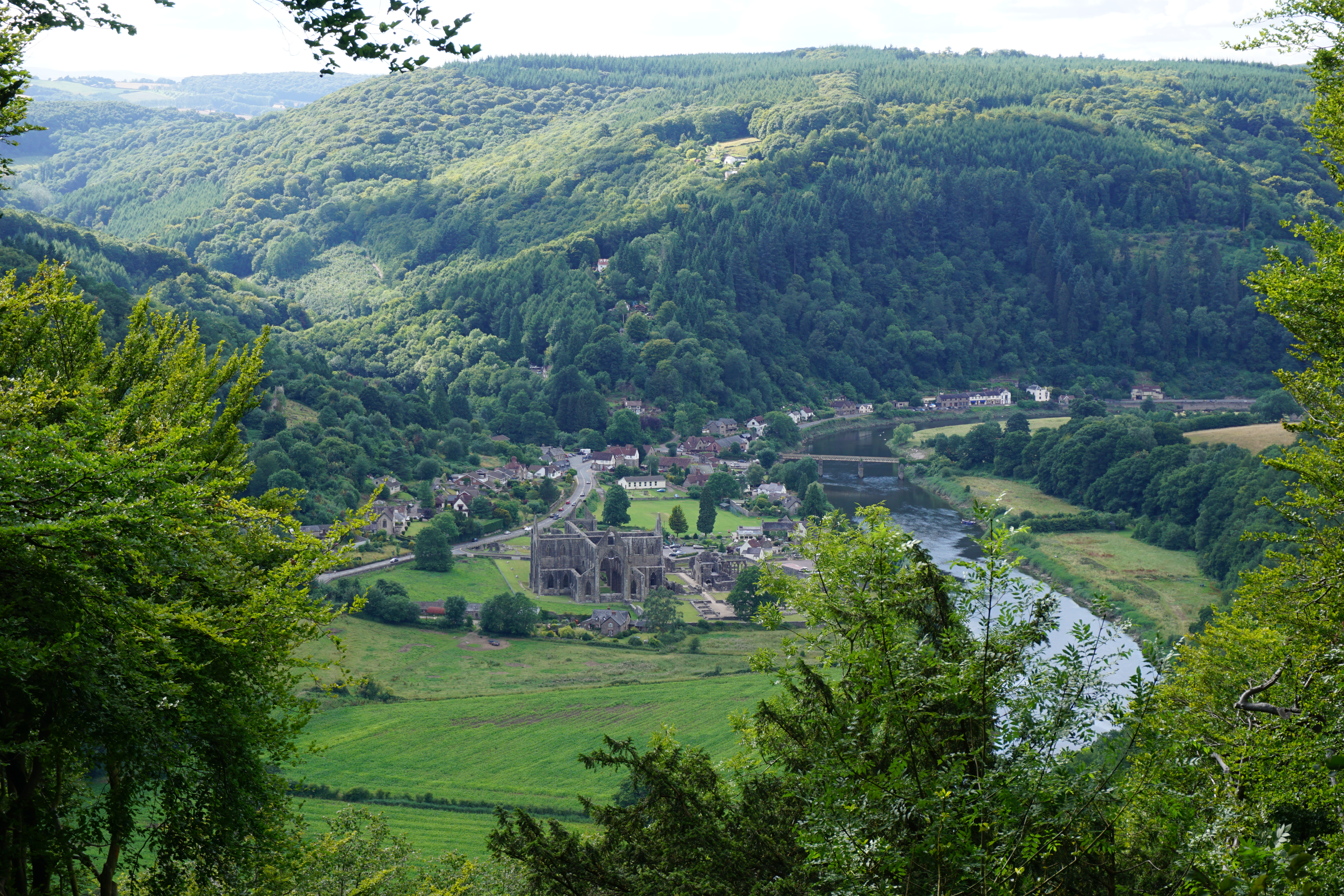
View of Tintern Abbey from the Devil's Pulpit

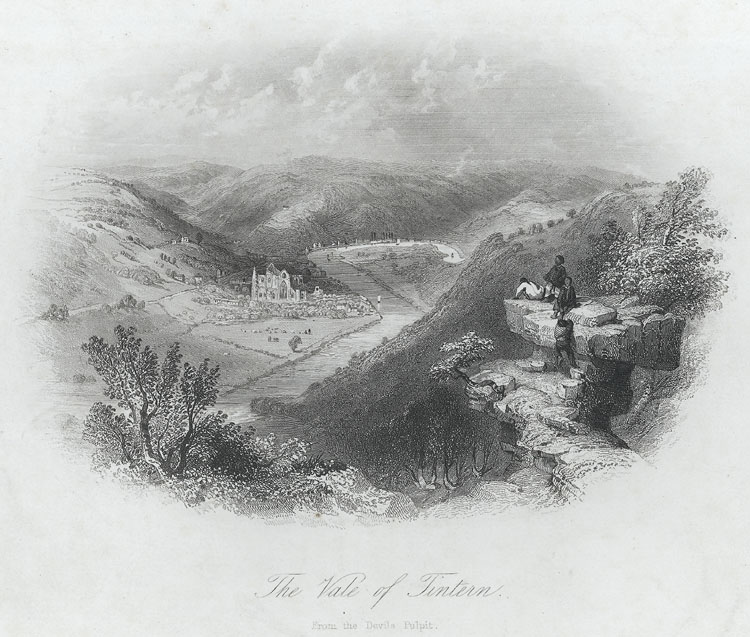
1845 view of Tintern Abbey from the Devil's Pulpit
