= Offa's Dyke Path =

Footpath in Wales and England

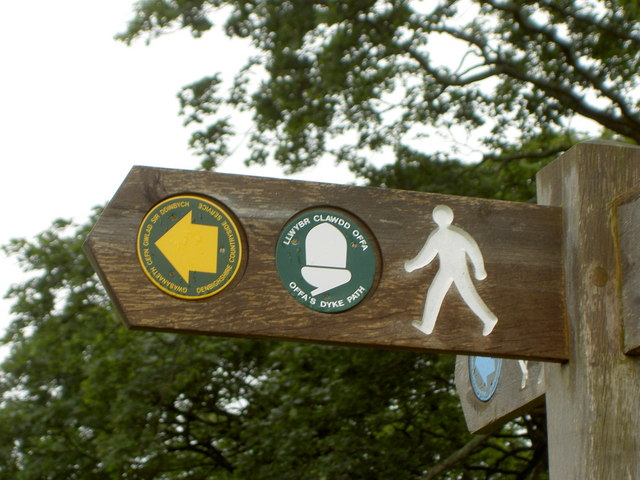
- Offa's Dyke Path signpost in Denbighshire
- Length: 177 mi (285 km)
- Location: English / Welsh border
- Established: 1971
- Designation: National Trail
- Trailheads: Sedbury 51.6324°N 2.6482°W; Prestatyn 53.3423°N 3.4126°W
- Use: Hiking
- Elevation gain/loss: 9,085 metres (29,806 ft)
- Highest point: Hatterrall Ridge, 703 m (2,306 ft)
- Season: All year

Offa's Dyke Path (Welsh: Llwybr Clawdd Offa) is a long-distance footpath loosely following the Wales–England border. Officially opened on 10 July 1971, by Lord Hunt, it is one of Britain's National Trails and draws walkers from throughout the world. About 60 miles (97 km) of the 177-mile (285 km) route either follows, or keeps close company with, the remnants of Offa's Dyke, an earthwork traditionally thought to have been constructed in the late 8th century on the orders of King Offa of Mercia.

== Walking trail ==
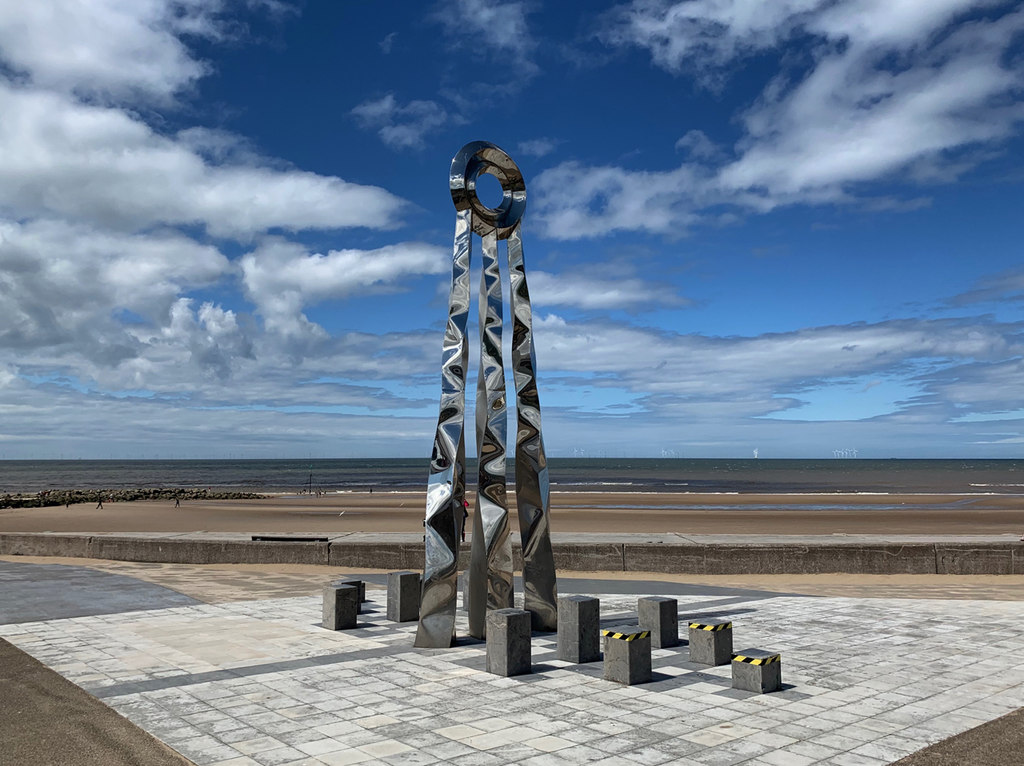
Offa's Dyke Path Monument at Prestatyn

Travelling south to north, starting by the Severn Estuary at Sedbury, near Chepstow, and finishing at Prestatyn on the north coast, the walk will take an average walker roughly 12 days to complete. Roughly following the border in parts, and elsewhere the ancient monument of Offa's Dyke, as well as natural features such as the Hatterrall Ridge, the Dyke Path passes through a variety of landscapes. The route traces the eastern edge of the Black Mountains, traverses Clun Forest, the Eglwyseg moors north of Llangollen and the Clwydian Range.

The route passes through the counties of Monmouthshire, Gloucestershire, Powys, Herefordshire, Shropshire, Wrexham, Denbighshire and Flintshire. The Welsh Marches (Marchia Wallie) is a term used to describe this border region between England and Wales, since it was recorded in the Domesday Book in 1086. It passes through, or close to, the towns of Chepstow, Monmouth, Hay-on-Wye, Kington, Presteigne, Knighton, Montgomery, Welshpool and Oswestry, then in and around the North Wales towns and villages of Llangollen, Llandegla, Bodfari and Dyserth.

The half-way point of the path is marked by the Offa's Dyke Centre in Knighton (52.3458°N 3.0517°W). There used to be around 600 stiles along the route, but many of these have now been replaced by kissing gates.

a certain vigorous king called Offa......had a great dyke built between Wales and Mercia from sea to sea.

— Asser

== Route ==
Places on the route and highlights on or near the trail:

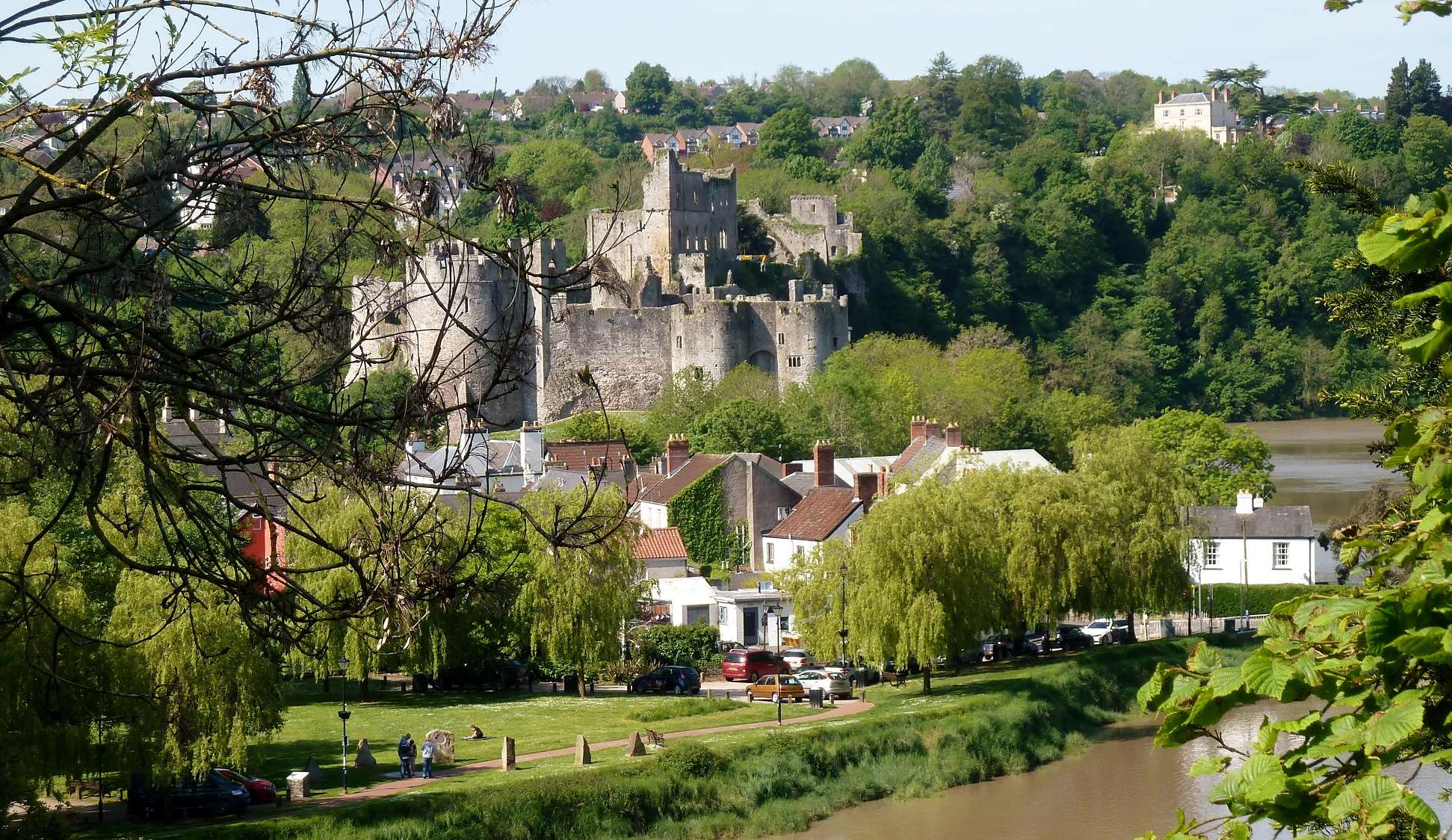
Chepstow Castle from Offa's Dyke Path

=== Chepstow to Monmouth ===
- Sedbury Cliffs: Severn Estuary, Severn Bridge
- Chepstow: Chepstow Castle, River Wye
- View of Tintern Abbey from the Devil's Pulpit
- Redbrook: Iron railway bridge
- The Kymin naval temple

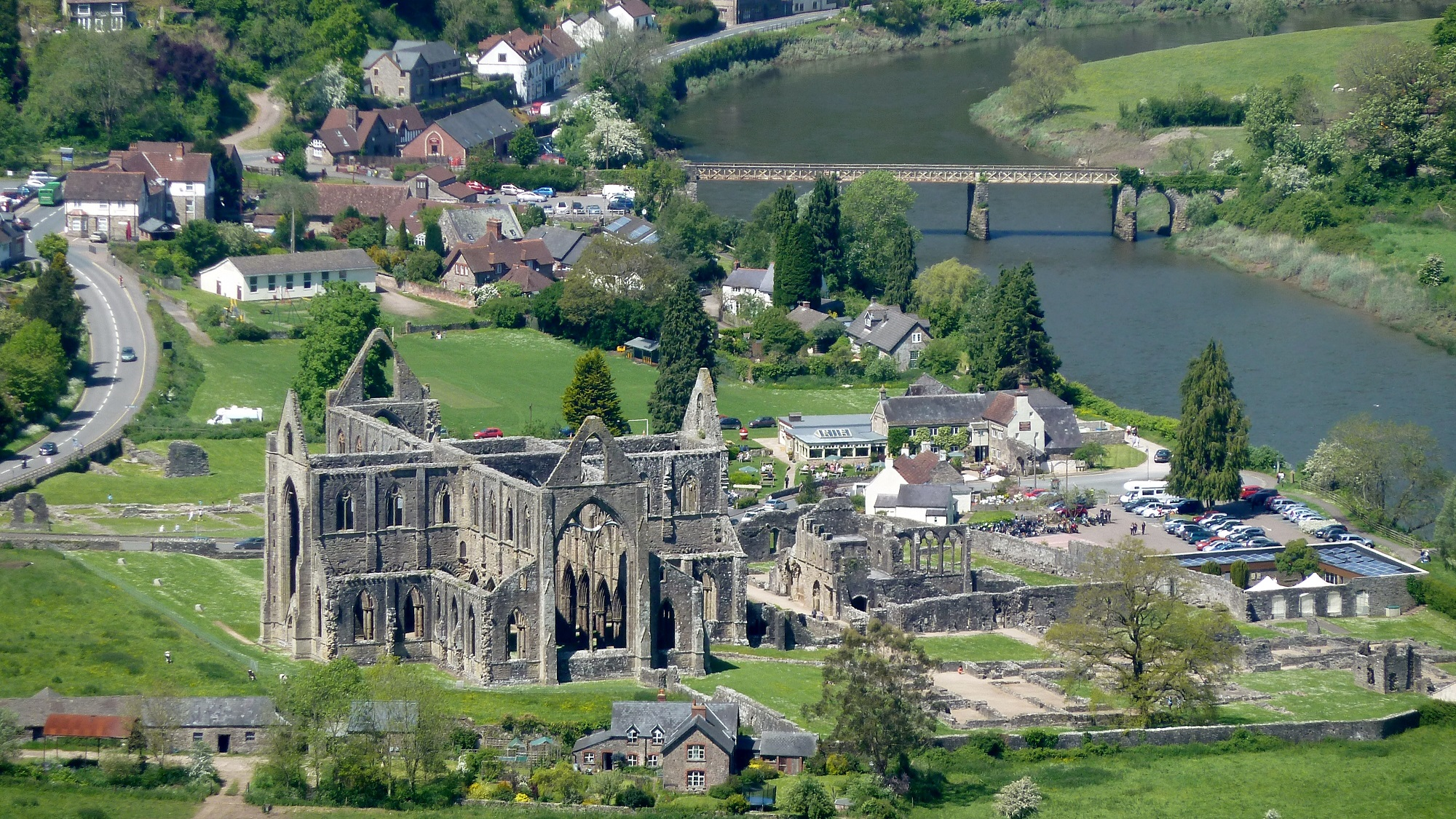
Tintern Abbey from Offa's Dyke Path

=== Monmouth to Hay-on-Wye ===
- Monmouth: Monnow Bridge
- White Castle
- Llangattock Lingoed: St Cadoc's church
- Pandy
- Hatterrall Ridge is the highest point on the trail at 703 m (2,310 ft)
- Black Mountains

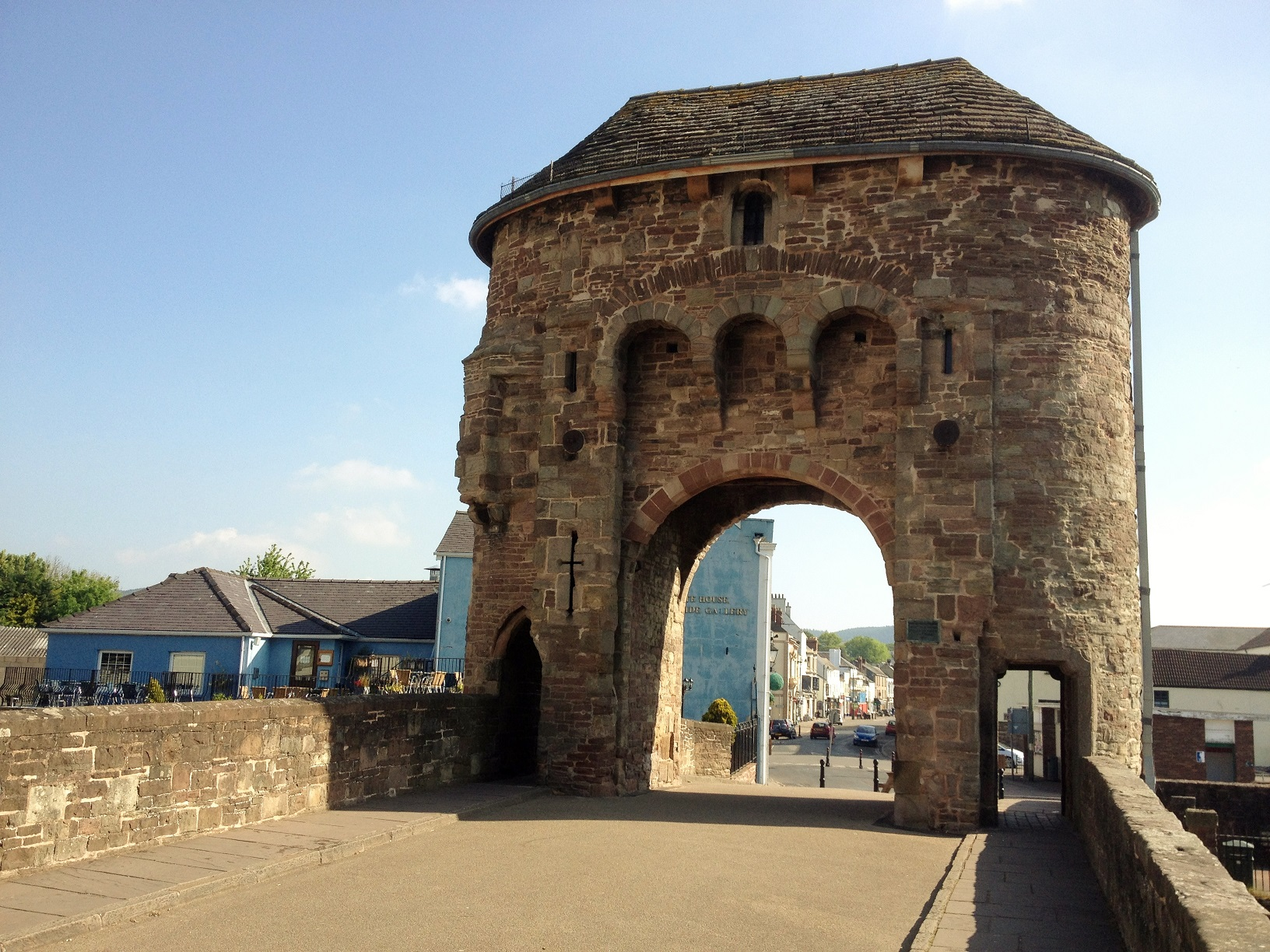
Monnow Bridge at Monmouth

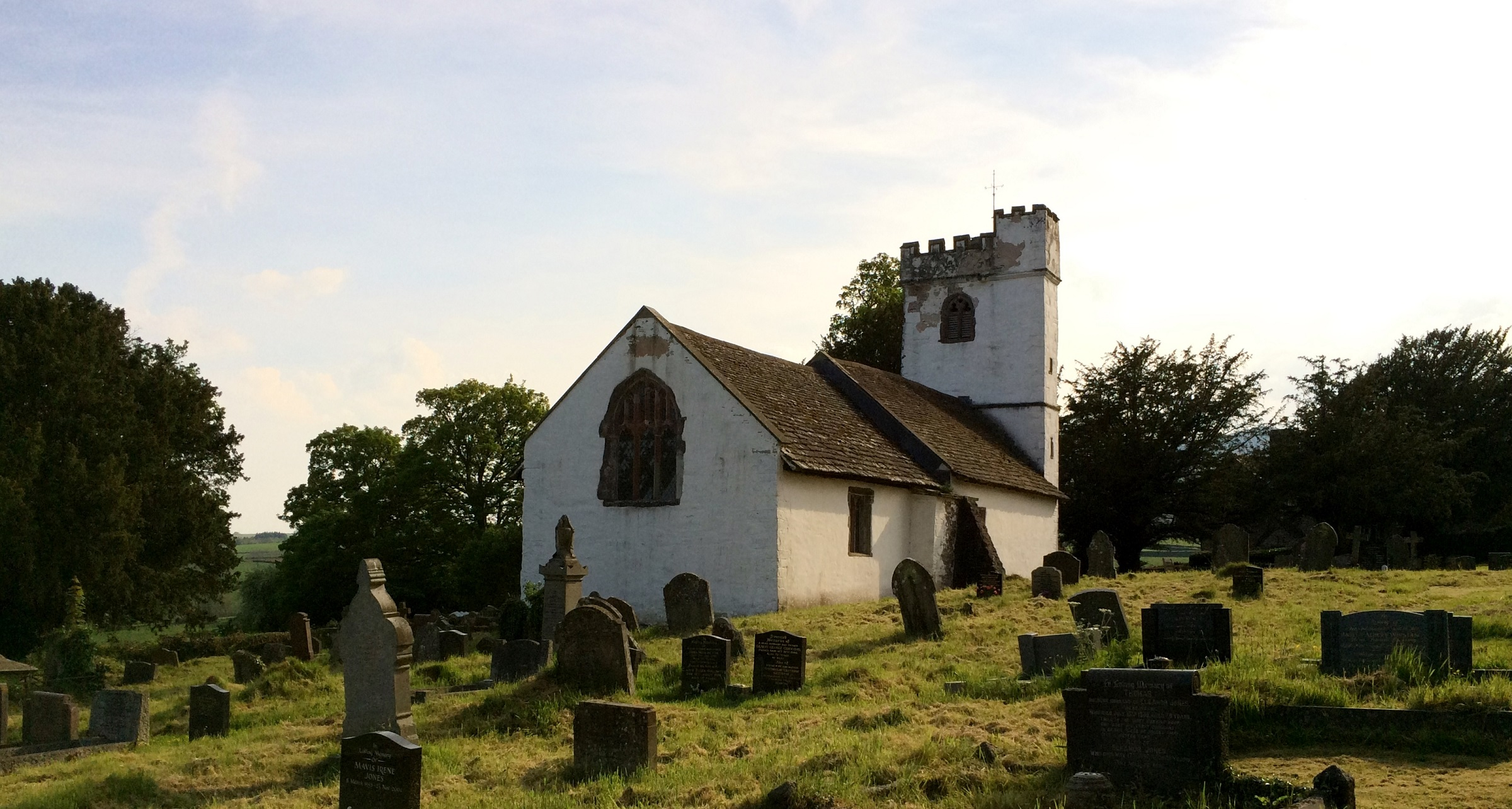
St Cadoc's at Llangattock Lingoed

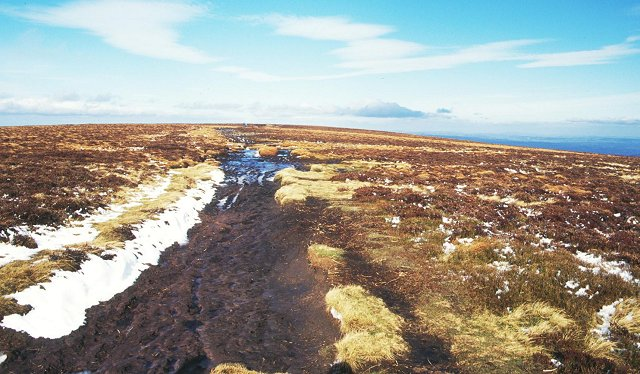
The summit of the Black Mountain crossed by the Offa's Dyke Path

- Llanthony Priory

=== Hay-on-Wye to Knighton ===
- Hay-on-Wye
- Newchurch
- Gladestry
- Hergest Ridge with wild ponies, 425 m (1,390 ft)
- Kington
- Hawthorn Hill, 406 m (1,330 ft)

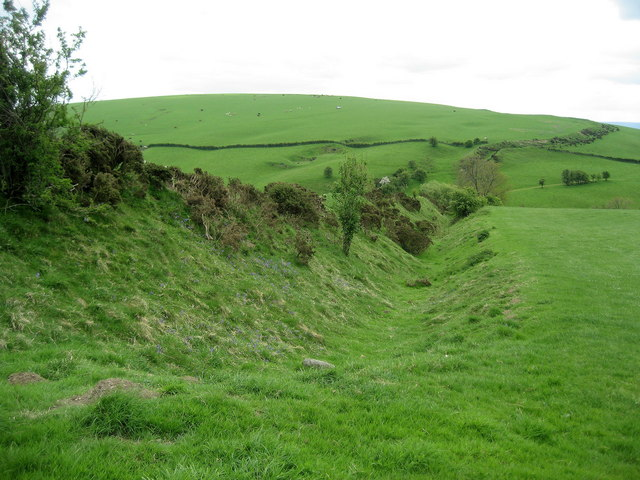
Dyke near Clun

=== Knighton to Montgomery ===
- Knighton: Offa's Dyke visitor centre
- Panpunton Hill, 374 m (1,230 ft)
- Cwm-Sanaham Hill 406 m (1,330 ft)
- Llanfair Hill, highest point of the dyke at 430 m (1,410 ft)
- Churchtown and Edenhope Hill

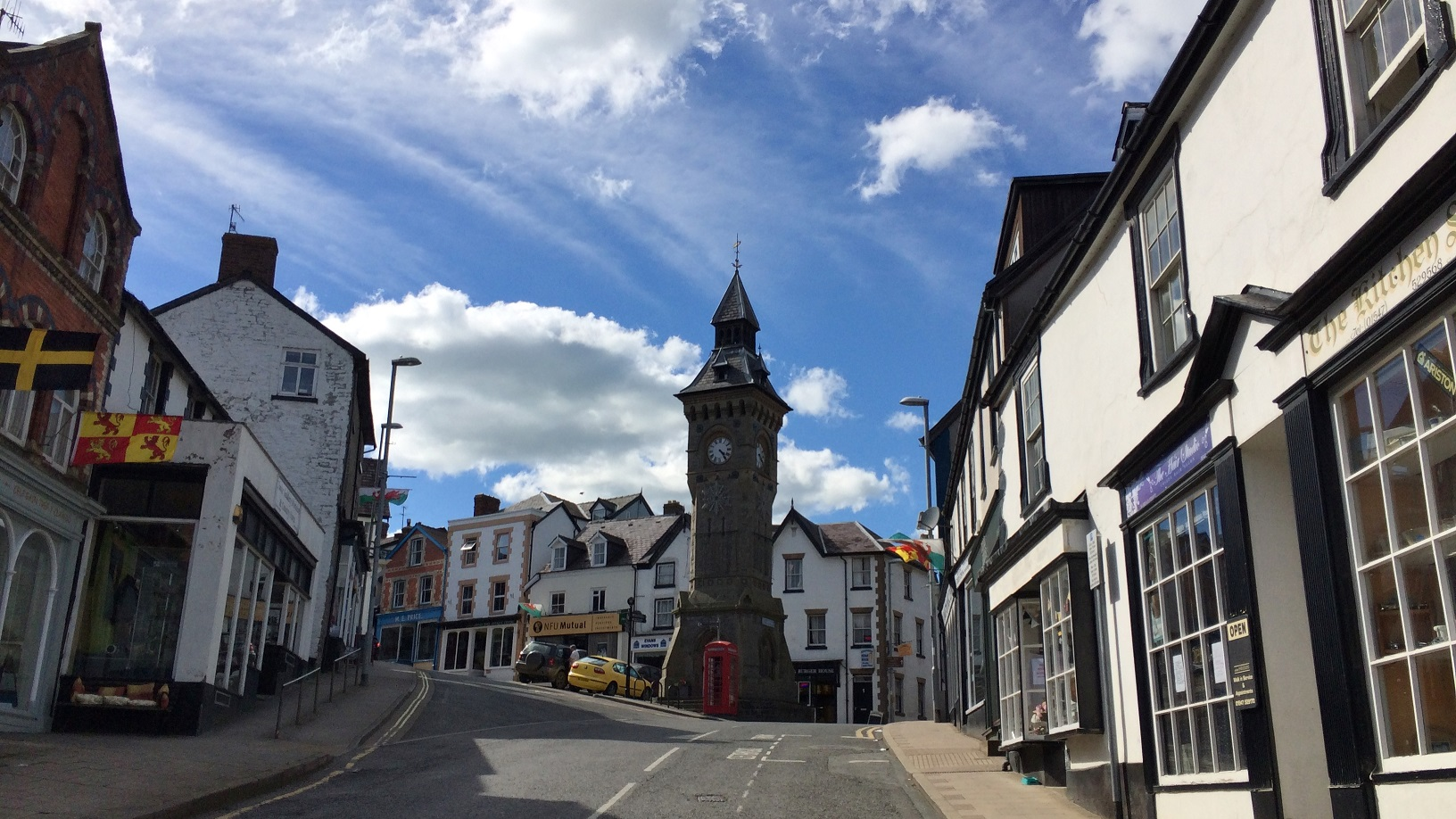
Knighton in Powys

=== Montgomery to Llanymynech ===
- Montgomery
- Chirbury
- Beacon Ring Iron Age hill fort (Caer Digoll)
- Buttington
- Alongside Montgomery Canal and dyke beside River Severn
- Four Crosses

=== Llanymynech to Trevor ===
- Llanymynech
- Moelydd, 285 m (940 ft)
- Trefonen
- Oswestry old racecourse at Racecourse Common
- Craignant
- Chirk Castle
- Llangollen Canal
- Pontcysyllte Aqueduct (World Heritage Site) over the River Dee

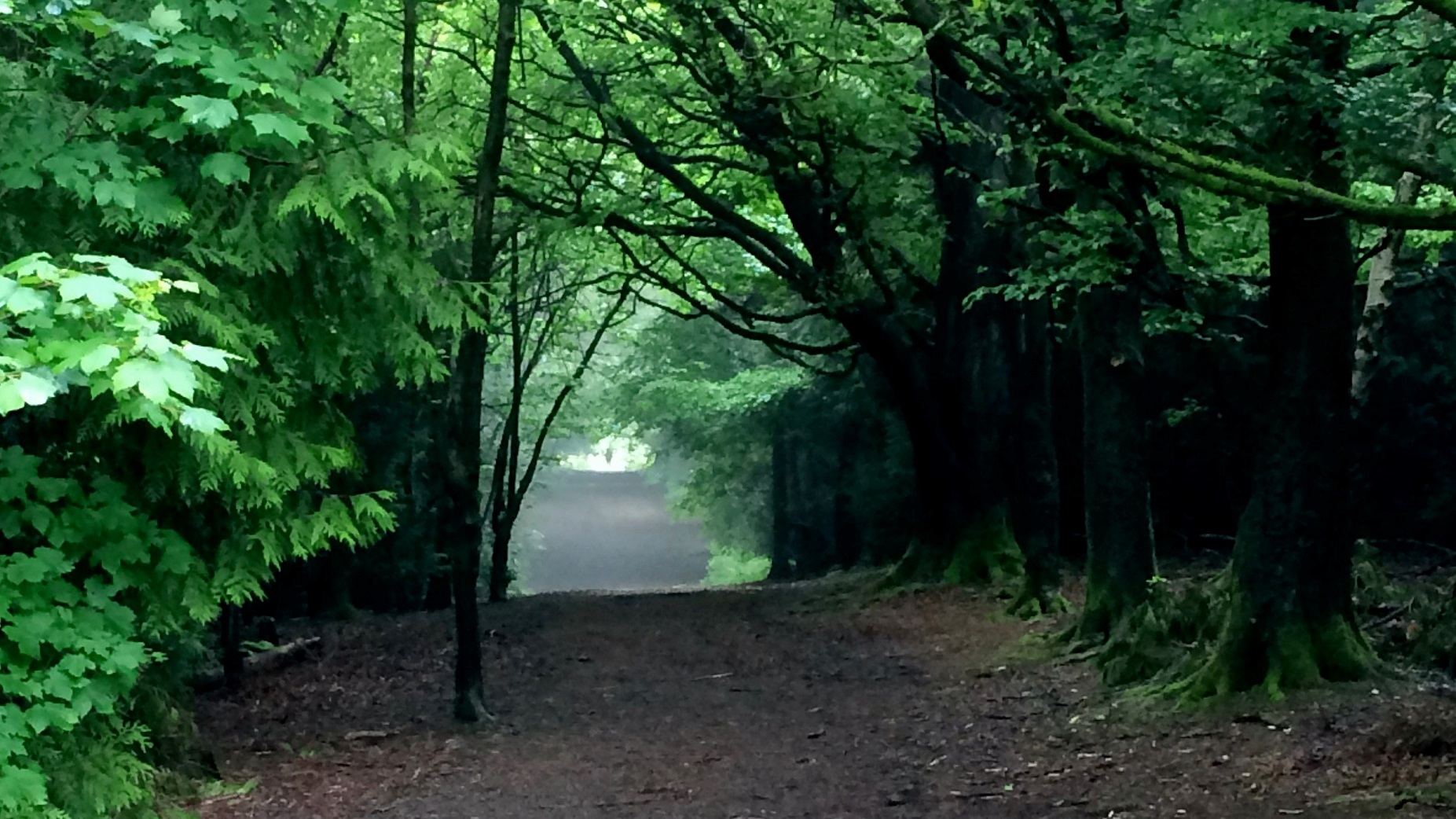
Path through Racecourse Woods

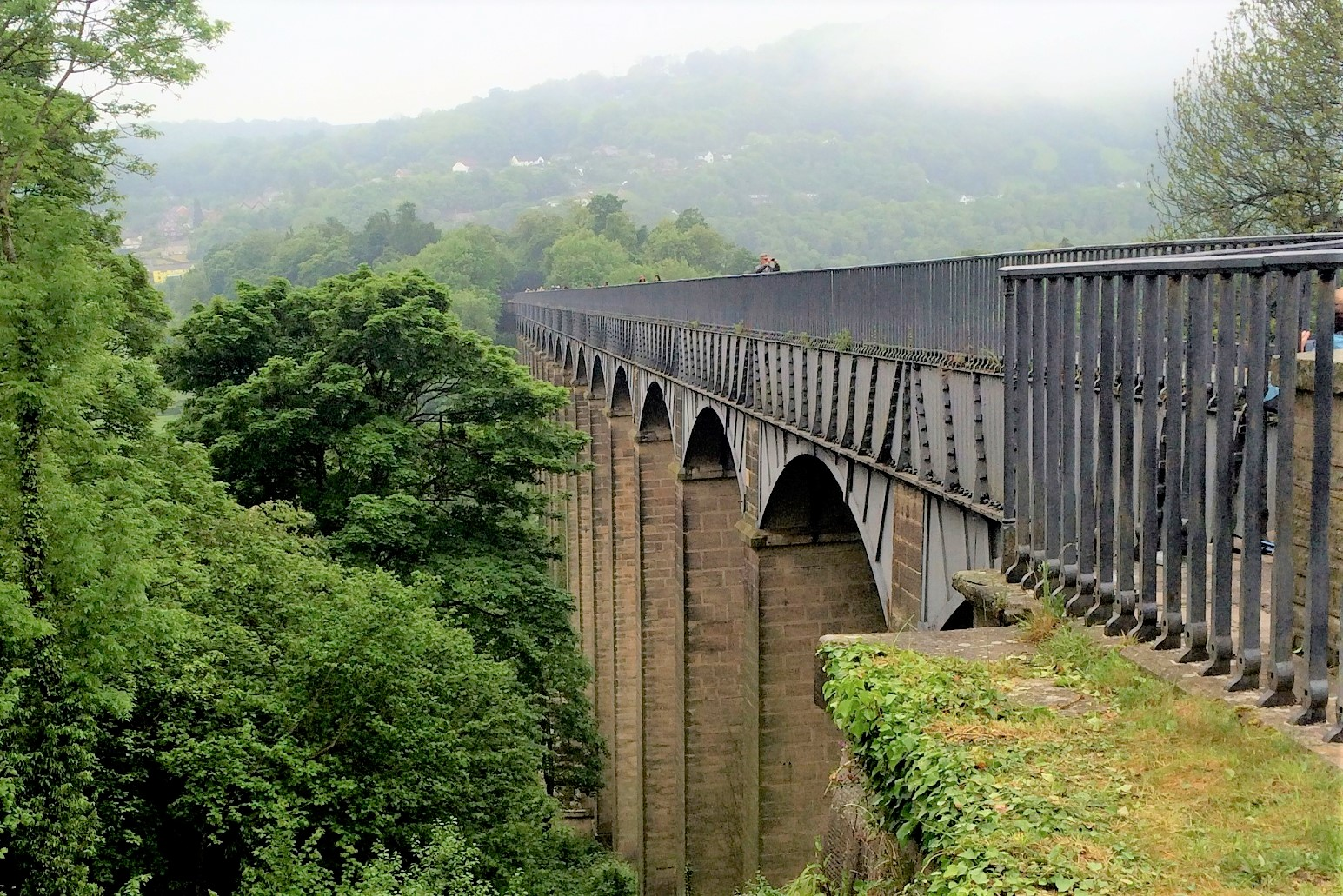
Pontcysyllte Aqueduct

=== Trevor to Prestatyn ===
- Trevor
- Llangollen Castle
- Eglwyseg Crags
- Llandegla Forest (with mountain bike trails)
- Llandegla
- Clwydian Range of hills:
  - Around Moel-y-Plas, 440 m (1,440 ft), Moel Llanfair, 447 m (1,470 ft), Moel Gyw, 467 m (1,530 ft) and Foel Fenlli, 511 m (1,680 ft)
  - Moel Famau, 555 m (1,820 ft) and Jubilee Tower at summit
  - Around Moel Dywyll, 472 m (1,550 ft), Moel Llys-y-Coed, 465 m (1,530 ft) and Moel Arthur, 455 m (1,490 ft)
  - Penycloddiau hill fort at 440 m (1,440 ft)
- Bodfari
- Rhuallt
- Prestatyn: Offa's Dyke Monument on the beach

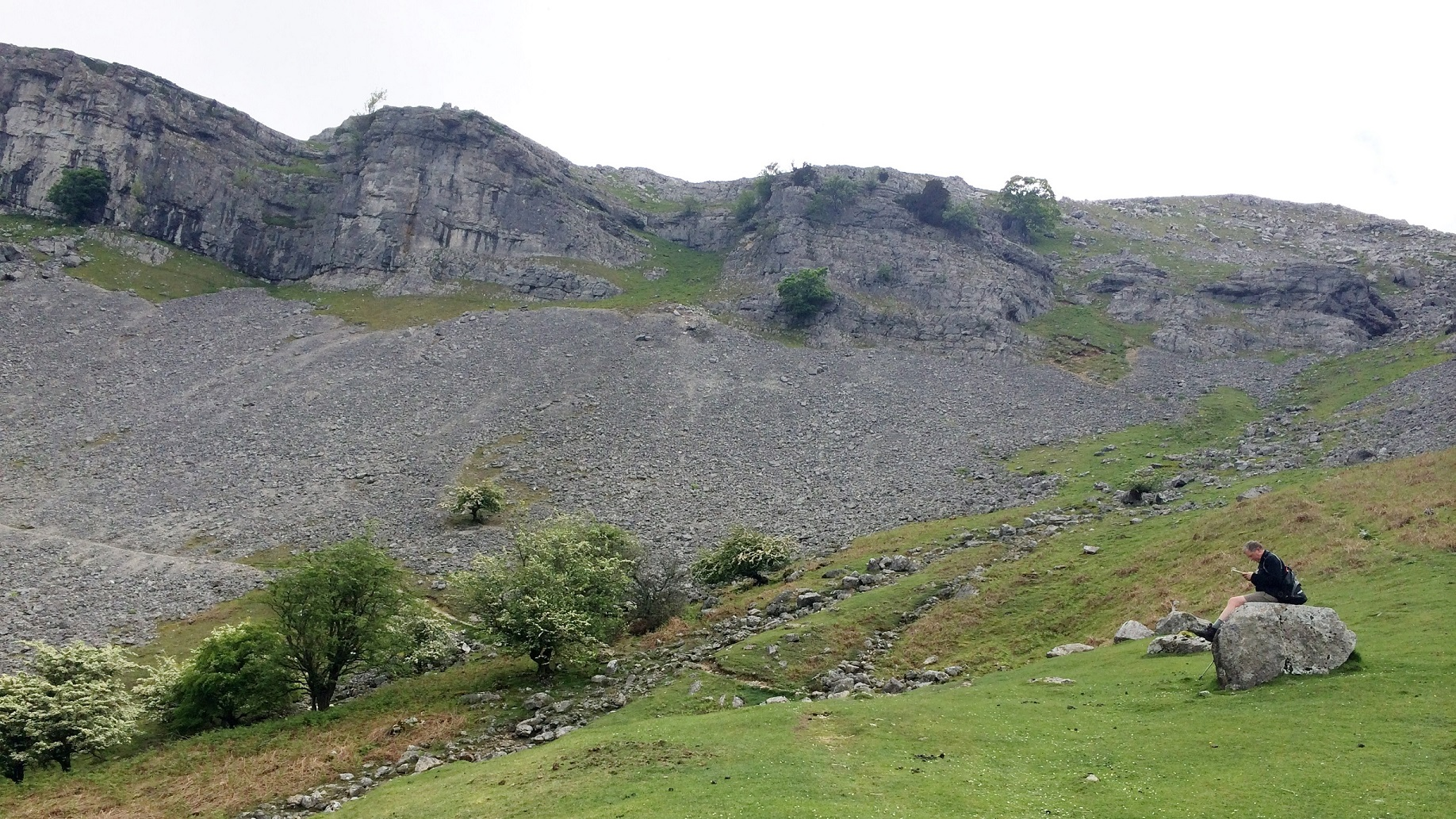
Eglwyseg Crags from the Path

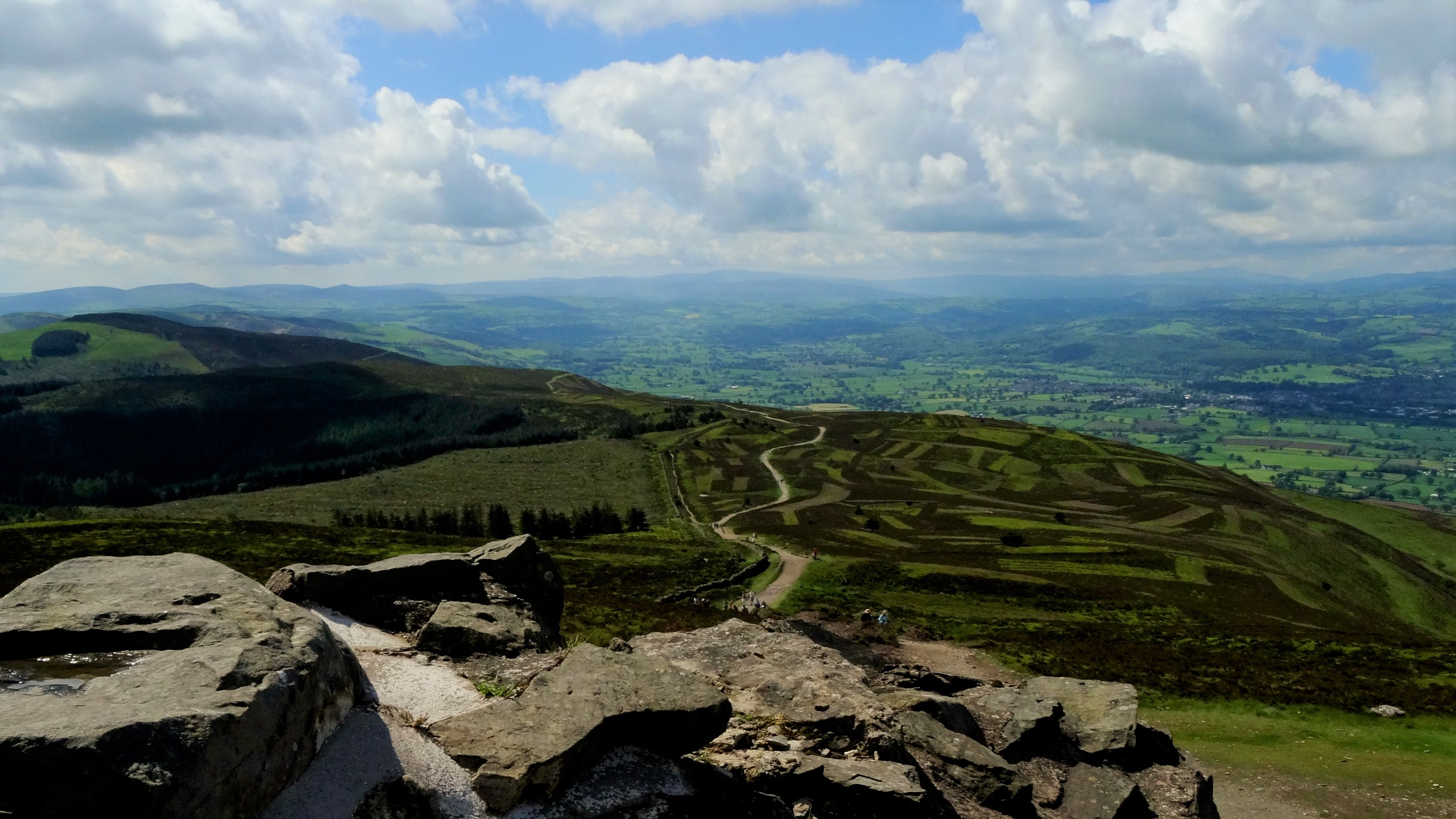
View from Jubilee Tower

== Promotion and media ==
Various bodies on either side of the border are collaborating on a sustainable tourism partnership, a principal focus of which is Walking with Offa, both on the trail but also in what has been dubbed Offa's Country i.e. in a corridor along the border.

The path was the focus of an episode of the Channel 4 program Britain's Ancient Tracks with Tony Robinson.

In June 2021, during the footpath's 50th year, an Offa's Dyke Rescue Fund was launched to restore eroded and other damaged parts of the route and to buy parts of the path at risk of sustained damage or negligence from local land owners. The fund is working in consultation with Cadw and English Heritage and the National Trail Unit.

On 22 August 2021, the BBC's Countryfile programme celebrated 50 years of the path.
