= Coleford Railway =

Railway line in the UK (Wyesham to Coleford)

The Coleford Railway was a railway company that constructed a short railway from near Monmouth to Coleford, close to the Forest of Dean. The company was sponsored by the Great Western Railway. It was built on part of the course of the Monmouth Railway, a horse-operated plateway, and it was intended that its primary business would be the conveyance of minerals and forest products from the Forest of Dean.

The line was built on the standard gauge and was 5 miles 20 chains (8.4 km) in length. It opened on 1 September 1883, and was worked by the GWR, which soon absorbed it.

It was never commercially successful, and it closed on 1 January 1917.

== History ==
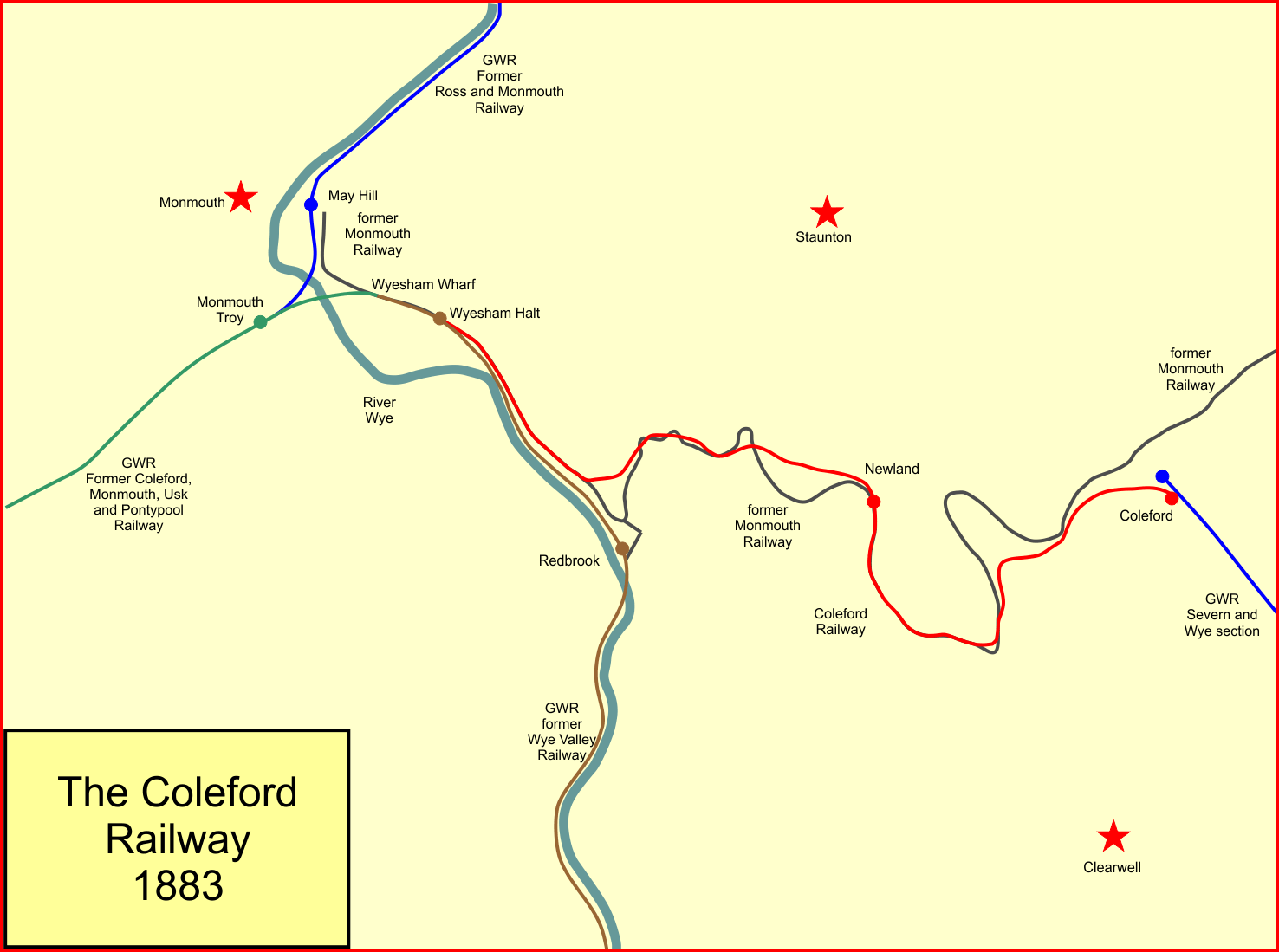
The Coleford Railway system

The Forest of Dean was rich in minerals, in particular coal and iron, and some tin and stone. Mineral extraction had been practised for centuries, and the Free Miners had certain exclusive rights. However this militated against the involvement of larger external companies and modernisation and industrialisation were discouraged. Coupled with the poor communications in the Forest before the advent of modern railways, this led to high costs and poor competitiveness.

Coleford was an important location as a focal point for western access to the minerals of the Forest of Dean. However the construction of the Coleford Railway, from Monmouth, came late after a series of other initiatives.

== Antecedent railways ==
=== Monmouth Railway ===
A number of short tramways were built to connect individual mines to onward transport, and the Monmouth Railway was authorised the Monmouth Railway Act 1810 (50 Geo. 3. c. cxxiii) to build a plateway between mines east of Coleford and May Hill at Monmouth. Powers were given to cross the River Wye at Monmouth and at Redbrook, although these were never taken up. The Monmouth Railway was to be a 3 ft 6 in (1,067 mm) gauge plateway, on which ordinary wagons with plain wheels could run. The company would not itself operate trains; it was to be a toll road, taking a toll charge from independent carriers who used it. It opened in stages between 1812 and 1817.

There were lengthy branches east of Coleford, serving collieries and pits. West of Coleford there were a tunnel and two rope-worked inclined planes, and the line terminated at Redbrook, adjacent to the River Wye, and at May Hill, on the east side of the Wye at Monmouth.

=== Coleford, Monmouth, Usk and Pontypool Railway ===
A group of promoters formulated a plan to build what became the Coleford, Monmouth, Usk and Pontypool Railway (CMU&PR); it was to run from Coleford through Monmouth to near Pontypool, joining the Newport, Abergavenny and Hereford Railway at Little Mill. This would give a more convenient railway connection for mineral traffic from the Forest of Dean to the ironworks of Nantyglo, Ebbw Vale, and Dowlais. The company planned to acquire the portion of the Monmouth Railway between Coleford and Monmouth, and convert it to edge railway operation.

The Coleford, Monmouth, Usk and Pontypool Railway Act 1853 (16 & 17 Vict. c. ccxvii) secured royal assent on 20 August 1853. Construction at the west end took place promptly, and the line from Little Mill to Usk opened for traffic on 2 June 1856. The Newport, Abergavenny and Hereford Railway worked the line.

The eastern section posed more problems, with tunnels at Usk and Monmouth, and a large river bridge at Monmouth. On 12 October 1857 the line was completed as far as the Troy station at Monmouth. From that date the company worked its own trains, using two locomotives hired in from the Newport, Abergavenny and Hereford Railway.

The construction had been expensive, and the company reconsidered the likely cost of the conversion of the Monmouth Railway. As a 3 ft 6in gauge horse-operated plateway, there were numerous sharp curves, unsuitable for locomotive operation, and the tunnel was of a small profile. The plateway permanent way would have required conversion for full railway operation with locomotives. After considerable deliberation the CMU&PR decided to build the river bridge at Monmouth (itself an expensive undertaking) but to make an interchange with the Monmouth Railway at Wyesham, transshipping there, but not proceeding further.

The bridge and extension to Wyesham were opened on 1 July 1861.

=== West Midland Railway ===
Meanwhile, the Newport, Abergavenny and Hereford Railway was collaborating with neighbouring concerns, and on 1 July 1860 the West Midland Railway Act 1860 (23 & 24 Vict. c. lxxxi) was passed forming the West Midland Railway from them. This gave access to mineral resources and to industrial areas requiring them. The Coleford, Monmouth, Usk and Pontypool Railway was already reliant on the CMU&PR, and now on the larger West Midland Railway, and a lease was agreed (for 1,000 years) of the CMU&PR to the West Midland Railway from 1 July 1861; it was ratified by the Coleford, Monmouth, Usk and Pontypool Railway (Lease, &c.) Act 1861 (24 & 25 Vict. c. cxcvii) of 22 July 1861.

The West Midland Railway had no appetite for proceeding with the conversion of the Monmouth Railway, and the matter remained unchanged: the portion of the Monmouth Railway west of Coleford was the (leasehold) property of the West Midland Railway but the whole Monmouth Railway concern continued to be run by its own managers, with whatever traffic was available being interchanged (and physically transshipped) at Wyesham.

The West Midland Railway was itself amalgamated with the Great Western Railway in 1863.

=== Wye Valley Railway ===
The Wye Valley Railway had opened on 1 November 1876, from a junction with the Great Western Railway main line near Chepstow, to Monmouth Troy. In fact the Monmouth termination was at Wyesham, at the end of the Coleford, Monmouth, Usk and Pontypool Railway line, now an integral part of the GWR system. Wyesham was not a junction at this stage, merely an interchange point with the plateway line of the Monmouth Railway. Wye Valley Railway trains gained access to Monmouth Troy station using the stub of the CMU&PR line, and crossed the River Wye using that company's viaduct.

== Coleford Railway ==
The primitive technology of the Monmouth Railway was a source of continuing frustration to its users, and in 1870 definite steps were taken towards providing a modern railway to the town. In fact the Severn and Wye Railway had its main line not far to the east, although difficult terrain intervened. The Severn and Wye Company submitted a parliamentary bill in the 1872 session to convert its Milkwall Tramway to railway operation and extend it to Coleford.

At the same time a nominally independent group, in fact sponsored by the Great Western Railway, proposed a branch line from the Wye Valley Railway at Wyesham to Coleford. The GWR already owned the portion of the former Monmouth Railway as far as Coleford, and now the Coleford Railway would convert it to modern standards.

Coleford Railway Act 1872
- Act of Parliament
- Parliament of the United Kingdom
- Long title: An Act for authorising the construction of Railways from near Monmouth to Coleford, in the counties of Monmouth and Gloucester; and for other purposes.
- Citation: 35 & 36 Vict. c. cxx

Dates
- Royal assent: 18 July 1872

Both the Severn and Wye Railway and the Coleford Railway schemes were authorised on the same day: the Coleford Railway was thus incorporated by an act of Parliament, the Coleford Railway Act 1872 (35 & 36 Vict. c. cxx) of 18 July 1872, with authorised capital of £66,000. It was to be 5 miles 20 chains in length.

Davis incorrectly says a second act of Parliament was required in 1875:

"An Act of July 18, 1872 authorised the construction of the Coleford Railway from Wyesham to Coleford. These powers were not exercised, and the Coleford Branch was built... under an Act of 1875."

In reality, the powers of the Coleford Railway Act 1872 were revived and extended by the Coleford Railway Act 1877 (40 & 41 Vict. c. l), of 28 June 1877.

The Coleford Railway followed the route of the Monmouth Tramroad for part of its route, but included several deviations to eliminate the sharp curves that were unsuitable for main line railway operation. The railway included four tunnels over its route, but there was only one intermediate station, at Newland.

== Opening ==
The process of conversion was not rapid, and it was not until 1 September 1883 that the branch opened for traffic. It was worked by the GWR from the outset.

The Coleford Railway was a small and unprofitable company that had been sponsored by the Great Western Railway and worked by it. Independence was an illusion, and the concern was vested in the Great Western Railway from 1 July 1884, ratified by an act of Parliament, the Great Western Railway (No. 1) Act 1884 (47 & 48 Vict. c. ccxxxv) of 7 August 1884.

Arrowsmith gave a detailed description of the line:

This railway has been constructed to provide direct connection by rail between Coleford and Monmouth... [Coleford] station forms the terminus of the Coleford Railway, and adjoins the station of the Severn and Wye Railway, but is not at present connected therewith.

Starting from this point the new line immediately passes under a peculiar iron girder bridge, which carries the public road from Coleford to Lydney over it. From this bridge the line inclines downwards, and continues to do so more or less sharply throughout its length, reaching at its other end a level of over 450 feet below that of Coleford station... The line is [next] carried across the upper end of the Whitecliff Valley on a high embankment, crossing the Newland Street on a high single-span skew bridge of stone or brick. The Coleford Gas Works adjoins this bank on the right... A rapid curve on the bank then quickly carries the line directly away from the town.

For another quarter of a mile the line is carried along the hillside in a direction parallel to the Redbrook Road, but high above it... On the left are here seen some old lime kilns and ironworks... The line then curves into a short tunnel, cut through solid mountain limestone, and emerges into a deep cutting... An immense quarry lies above this cutting on the right, which has been excavated to supply stone for burning in the numerous lime kilns formerly worked here, many of which are still standing, but now cold and deserted... [Now] winding through a short cutting in clay and white limestone, the line comes abruptly upon a high embankment which carries it by a short curve across an arm of the Whitecliff Valley, down which runs the old road from Newland to Coleford. A long massive bridge of stone and brick carries the heavy bank over this road; while on the right a relic of the humble tramway – predecessor of this railway – is seen in the shape of the little bridge which carried its rails across the road at a point higher up the valley. The railway after passing up this embankment – which is about a mile from Coleford station – cuts off a corner of Bircham Wood, and continues its course along the hillside for another half a mile, when, with a sharp turn to the right, it sweeps rapidly round through a deep cutting and under a handsome little stone bridge, and suddenly brings into view the picturesque village of Newland... Less than half a mile further on the line, after having been carried down the hillside on a long embankment, enters by a sharp curve another deep cutting conducting it into a tunnel 280 yards long, which carries it under the ridge which here separates the Upper Redbrook Valley from the Whitecliff Valley.

After a short run through a red loam cutting the line enters the next station – Newland – two and a quarter miles from Coleford. Here the railway widens into a 'double line', to allow up and down trains to pass each other, and two platforms are provided. The booking offices, waiting shed and goods shed are small shapely structures, neatly built in Forest stone. A goods yard, with the necessary sidings, lies on the right of the passenger station. The road from Newland to Redbrook is close to the railway at this point, and below the station is met by two roads from Staunton on the right, which cross the railway by a level crossing opposite the Cherry Orchard Farm. From the station the line makes a bold curve to the left and enters the Upper Redbrook Valley, the right slope of which it now follows for some distance.

After winding through a deep rock cutting the line crosses the Staunton Road Valley – three miles from Coleford – on a high embankment, which is carried over the highway below by a handsome stone bridge of great size and strength. For nearly a mile further the line winds along the hillside, through several cuttings and a short tunnel, till the village of Upper Redbrook comes in sight for a moment, when it quickly bends to the right through a deep cutting in old red sandstone, and enters a curved tunnel about 270 yards long, the other end of which is in the Wye Valley. On leaving the tunnel, the line being at a great height above the river, the beautiful valley of the Wye is seen to great advantage. As the line continues its course toward Monmouth – closely hugging the hillside and gradually falling in level – the railway from Chepstow to Monmouth is seen some 70 or 80 feet below, steadily rising as it approaches the hamlet of Wyesham, where the falling gradient of the Coleford Railway brings that line to the same level as its neighbour. The rails then converge, and the remaining distance to Monmouth – which town is seen in front about a mile distant – is traversed on the rails previously used only by the Wye Valley Railway trains.

The passenger service consisted of two trains each way in the morning, and two in the afternoon Mondays to Fridays, some of these running as mixed trains. The journey took around 20 minutes using four-wheeled carriages.

The Severn and Wye Railway station at Coleford had been opened in 1875. The two stations, of the Severn and Wye and the Coleford Railway, were adjacent and there were shared sidings for the transfer of goods wagons, but through running was not possible; in fact a complex backshunt was involved to work vehicles through.

On the opening of the Coleford branch, the GWR immediately cancelled through goods rates from Coleford to GWR stations via the Severn and Wye line.

== Closure ==
Throughout its operating life the line never really fulfilled the hopes expected of it and it was closed on 1 January 1917. Shortly afterwards most of the track was lifted and the rails were taken to France in connection with the exigencies of World War I. Whitecliff Quarry continued to be productive, and its output was conveyed over 71 chains (1.4 km) of the Coleford branch, and through the sidings at Coleford, requiring four reversals, and on to the former Severn and Wye system.

After the main railway operations had ceased, the tunnel at Newland was taken over for the cultivation of mushrooms. Ammunition was stored here during World War II, and Newland station was requisitioned by the Air Ministry as their local headquarters with the signal box becoming the guardroom. In connection with this military presence the two tunnels at Redbrook were also used as ammunition stores after the ends of both structures had been securely bricked up.

The line from Whitecliff Quarry to Coleford continued in use for the transportation of limestone until 1967, after which date there was no railway activity on the line.

== Today's remnants ==
The signal box and goods shed at the GWR station at Coleford has been converted into a museum dedicated to the railways of the Forest of Dean and the Great Western Railway: see Coleford Great Western Railway Museum.

== Topography ==
=== Station list ===
- Coleford; opened 1 September 1883; closed 1 January 1917;
- Newland; opened 1 September 1883; closed 1 January 1917; also known as Cherry Orchard
- Wyesham Junction; convergence with the Wye Valley line.

=== Gradients ===
The line descended without a break from Coleford to Monmouth; typical gradients were 1 in 42 with only short sections of more moderate gradient.
