= Wyesham =

Coordinates: 51.807°N 2.7°W

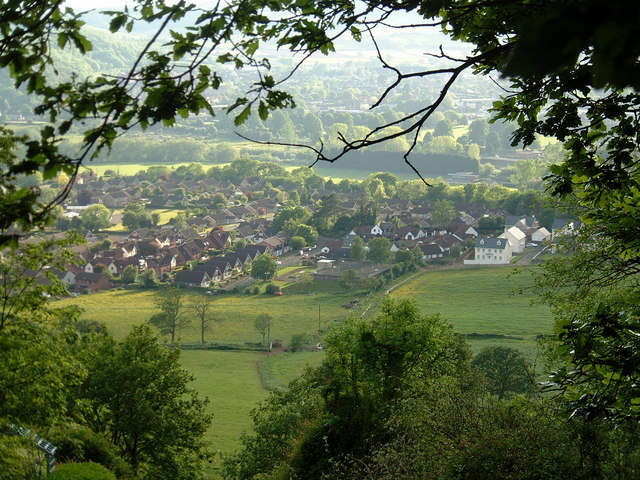
- View of Justin's Hill and Wyesham from the Kymin

- Location within Monmouthshire
- OS grid reference: SO518122
- Principal area: Monmouthshire
- Preserved county: Gwent
- Country: Wales
- Sovereign state: United Kingdom
- Post town: MONMOUTH
- Postcode district: NP25
- Dialling code: 01600
- Police: Gwent
- Fire: South Wales
- Ambulance: Welsh
- UK Parliament: Monmouthshire
- Senedd Cymru – Welsh Parliament: Monmouth

Wyesham is a village and electoral ward in Monmouthshire, Wales. It is located less than one mile east of Monmouth, on the opposite side of the River Wye.

== History and amenities ==
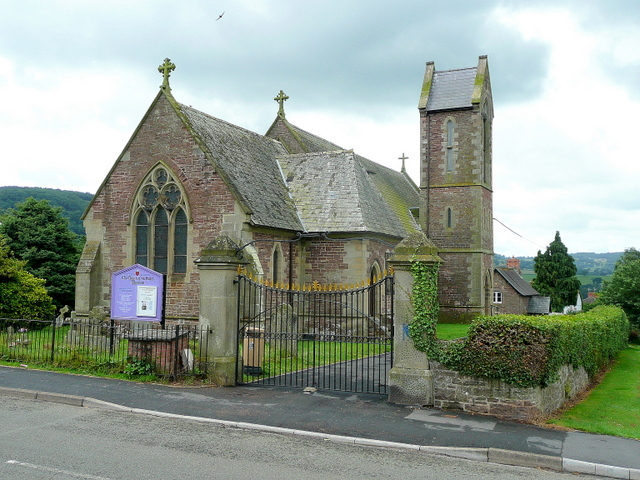
St James' Church, Wyesham

Wyesham is effectively a suburb of Monmouth the county town. The Forest of Dean starts uphill from Wyesham and Offa's Dyke Path long distance footpath passes above the village and the Wye Valley Walk runs close by beside the river.

The Roundhouse and Royal Naval Temple which overlooks Monmouth and the Wye Valley at this point on Kymin Hill is located nearby.

== Representation ==
Wyesham is a community electoral ward to Monmouth Town Council, electing four town councillors. The ward stretches north from Wyesham village, bounded to the west and the north by the River Wye and to the east by the Gloucestershire border.

Wyesham is also an electoral division of Monmouthshire County Council, coterminous with the community ward, electing a county councillor. The 2004, 2008 and 2012 elections were won by Conservative councillor Elizabeth Hackett-Pain.

== See also ==
- Wyesham Halt railway station (closed)
