= Redbrook =

Village in Gloucestershire, England

Coordinates: 51.788°N 2.674°W

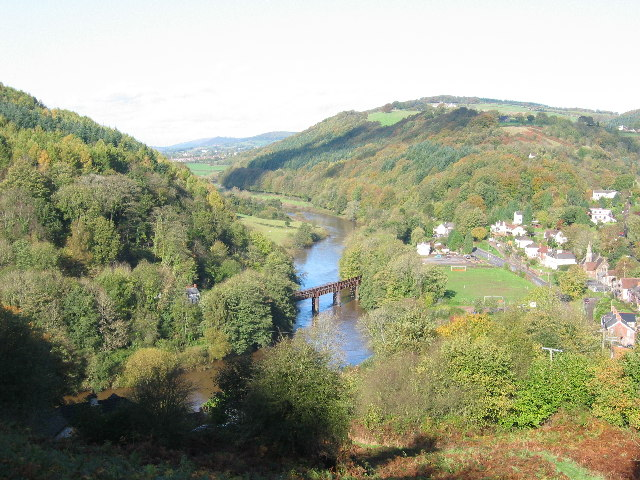
- Redbrook in the Wye valley, looking north towards Monmouth and showing the former railway bridge, with Wales to the left and England to the right

- Location within Gloucestershire
- OS grid reference: SO536099
- Civil parish: Newland, Gloucestershire Trellech United
- District: Forest of Dean
- Shire county: Gloucestershire
- Region: South West
- Country: England
- Sovereign state: United Kingdom
- Post town: MONMOUTH
- Postcode district: NP25
- Dialling code: 01600
- Police: Gloucestershire
- Fire: Gloucestershire
- Ambulance: South Western

Redbrook is a village in Gloucestershire, England, adjoining the border with Monmouthshire, Wales. It is located on the River Wye and is within the Wye Valley Area of Outstanding Natural Beauty.

== History ==
Both Upper and Lower Redbrook were mentioned in the Domesday Book of 1086 as lying within the hundred of Bromsash and they were both listed under Gloucestershire and Herefordshire. At that time neither place was recorded as having any population.

Redbrook was historically an important industrial centre with many industrial sites including mills, an ironworks, tinplate works and copper works. The oldest site is the King's Mill, which was a corn mill first recorded in 1434 and which remained in use until 1925.

The Redbrook Copper Works used ore brought from Cornwall via Chepstow and worked until 1740 when it closed down and the buildings were leased for the manufacturer of tinplate. It is from the iron ore that the village got its name – the brook running down the valley through the village often ran dark red. The tinplate factory, run by the Redbrook Tinplate Company, was known for the high quality product it made and did not close until 1962. Redbrook was also a river port where the various products of the local industries were shipped.

The village once boasted no less than 13 inns and three breweries. The last brewery to close, in 1926, was Redbrook Brewery and the site is still marked by Brewery Yard and Brewery Terrace.

Redbrook on Wye was the last station before Monmouth on the Wye Valley Railway. The railway was opened in 1876 to connect Monmouth to the South Wales line, closing to passengers in 1959 and freight in 1964. Today a wood-decked footbridge spans the river which once carried the railway.

== Amenities ==
Redbrook has a population of 372 and is a village amidst wooded hills. A little above the river is the 19th-century church of St. Saviour.

Two local pubs, the Boat Inn at Penallt on the Welsh side of the River Wye and the Bell Inn on the English side, serve local and visitors well. The Boat Inn is accessed from Redbrook via Penallt Viaduct, which used to carry the Wye Valley Railway across the river. The village also has a post office and stores.

The Offa's Dyke Path and the Wye Valley Walk run through the village.

== Sports club ==
Redbrook Rovers, established in the mid 1900s has 2 football teams, the first team currently playing in North Gloucestershire football league Premier Division and the Reserves in Division 3.
