= Tintern Wireworks Branch =

UK railway branch line

Coordinates: 51.6994°N 2.6813°W

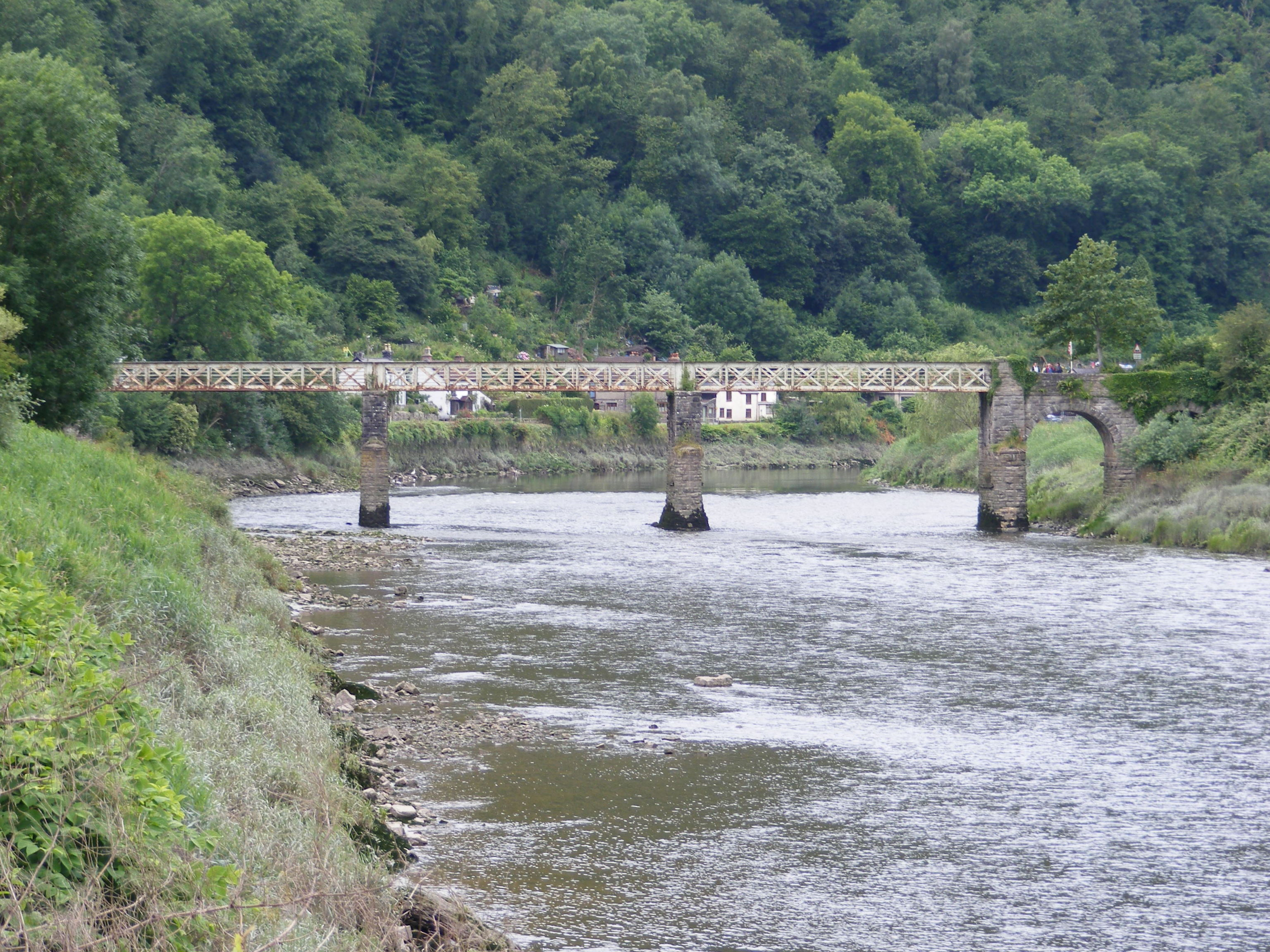
The bridge that carried the branch over the River Wye.

The Tintern Wireworks Branch was a short branch line on the Wye Valley Railway, crossing the tidal River Wye between Monmouthshire, Wales, and Gloucestershire, England. It was completed in 1874 and opened on 1 November 1876; the reason for the delay was that the Wye Valley Railway, into which the branch line fed, was not completed until the latter date. It closed in 1935 when the rails buckled in the heat of the summer.

The bridge that carried the line over the Wye, known as the Tintern Wireworks Bridge or Old Tramway Bridge, is now used as a footpath.

== History ==
=== Wye Valley Amendment Act ===
In 1866 the Wye Valley Railway Company announced that it would not build a line through the village of Tintern, but by-pass it. To make up for this the company was forced to build a branch to the wireworks on the other side of Tintern. The Wye Valley Amendment Act was passed on 14 June 1875 stating that the company would forever maintain the branch and junction in good repair; as well as setting the regulations on running the line. The line was designed out by the engineering firm, S. H. Yockney, of London, (Note: Samuel Hansard Yockley, the founder of S. H. Yockley, undertook much work in Wales and the West of England, including for Isambard Kingdom Brunel on the Great Western Railway.) and the construction works were carried out by the Isca Foundry Co. of Newport.

=== Abbey Wire and Tinplate Company ===
By August 1875, before the opening of the branch, the Abbey Wireworks Company had stopped trading. The line remained practically empty until the early 1880s when the works were taken over by the Abbey Wire and Tinplate Company; this venture was short lived and the works closed in 1901. The privately owned locomotive was sold and from then on the branch was only used by horses for the sawmills and turnery works in the village.

=== Closure ===
The line closed in 1935. Most of the tracks were lifted in 1941 and sent for scrap. The junction with the Wye Valley Railway was lifted in 1945 and was the last part of the branch to be lifted. The weigh house on the line survived until the late 1970s.

== Tintern Wireworks Bridge ==
The bridge carrying the branch over the Wye today carries a public footpath. It is known as the Tintern Wireworks Bridge or the Old Tramway Bridge. John Newman, in his Gwent/Monmouthshire volume of the Pevsner Buildings of Wales, notes the bridge's "three steel-truss spans on two high, rock-faced, piers."

=== Heritage status ===
The bridge is a Grade II listed structure and has two listings, as is often the case with bridges that cross county borders; in this case, a Welsh designation by Cadw for the section in Monmouthshire, and an English designation by Historic England for the section in Gloucestershire.

=== Restoration in 2022/23 ===
An assessment of the bridge undertaken in 2021 by Gloucestershire County Council found its condition to be unsafe due to severe corrosion, and the bridge was closed to all vehicular traffic in October 2021. A one-year restoration, costing £1.5M, began in 2022. The bridge was closed to all traffic, including pedestrians, from late June 2022. The restoration work included removal of the timber deck and its replacement with a steel deck; strengthening of the structure, including the installation of new box beams; grit blasting and painting; and repointing the masonry supports. The bridge re-opened at the end of May 2023.

=== In popular culture ===
The bridge featured as a setting in Episode 1.2 of the 2019 Netflix comedy drama series Sex Education.
