= Ormerod =

Ormerod is an English-language surname, likely of toponymic origin. Orthographical variations include Ormrod. Notable people with the surname include:

- Anthony Ormerod (1979), English footballer
- Benjamin Ormerod (1890–1974), English judge (1890-1974)
- Berkeley Ormerod (1897–1983), English soldier, diplomat, and sportsman
- Brett Ormerod (born 1976), English football player
- David Ormerod, British professor of criminal law
- Denis Ormerod (1922–2005), British Army officer
- Edward Ormerod (1834–1894), English mining engineer
- Edward Latham Ormerod (1819–1873), English physician and amateur entomologist
- Eleanor Anne Ormerod (1828–1901), English entomologist
- George Ormerod (1785–1873), English historian and antiquarian
- George Milner Ormerod (1879–1936), British army officer
- Georgiana Ormerod (1822–1896), British naturalist
- Jan Ormerod (1946 – 2013), Australian illustrator of children's books
- Joseph Arderne Ormerod (1848–1925), English physician, neurologist, and psychiatrist
- Katie Ormerod (born 1997), British snowboarder
- Mark Ormerod (civil servant) (1957), British civil servant
- Mark Ormerod (footballer) (1976), English footballer
- Nick Ormerod (1951), British theatre designer
- Paul Ormerod (born 1950), British economist
- Peter Ormerod (1950–2019), English chest physician
- Robert Ormerod, Scottish photographer
- Sam Ormerod (1848–1906), English footballer, referee, and manager
- Steve Ormerod (2000), English academic
- Thomas Ormerod (1810–1874), British academic and churchman
- William Piers Ormerod (1818–1860), English anatomist and surgeon

== See also ==
- Ormrod
- Ormerod Pearse (1884–1953), South African cricketer
