= Latham of Bradwall =

Family of Bradwall, Cheshire East, England

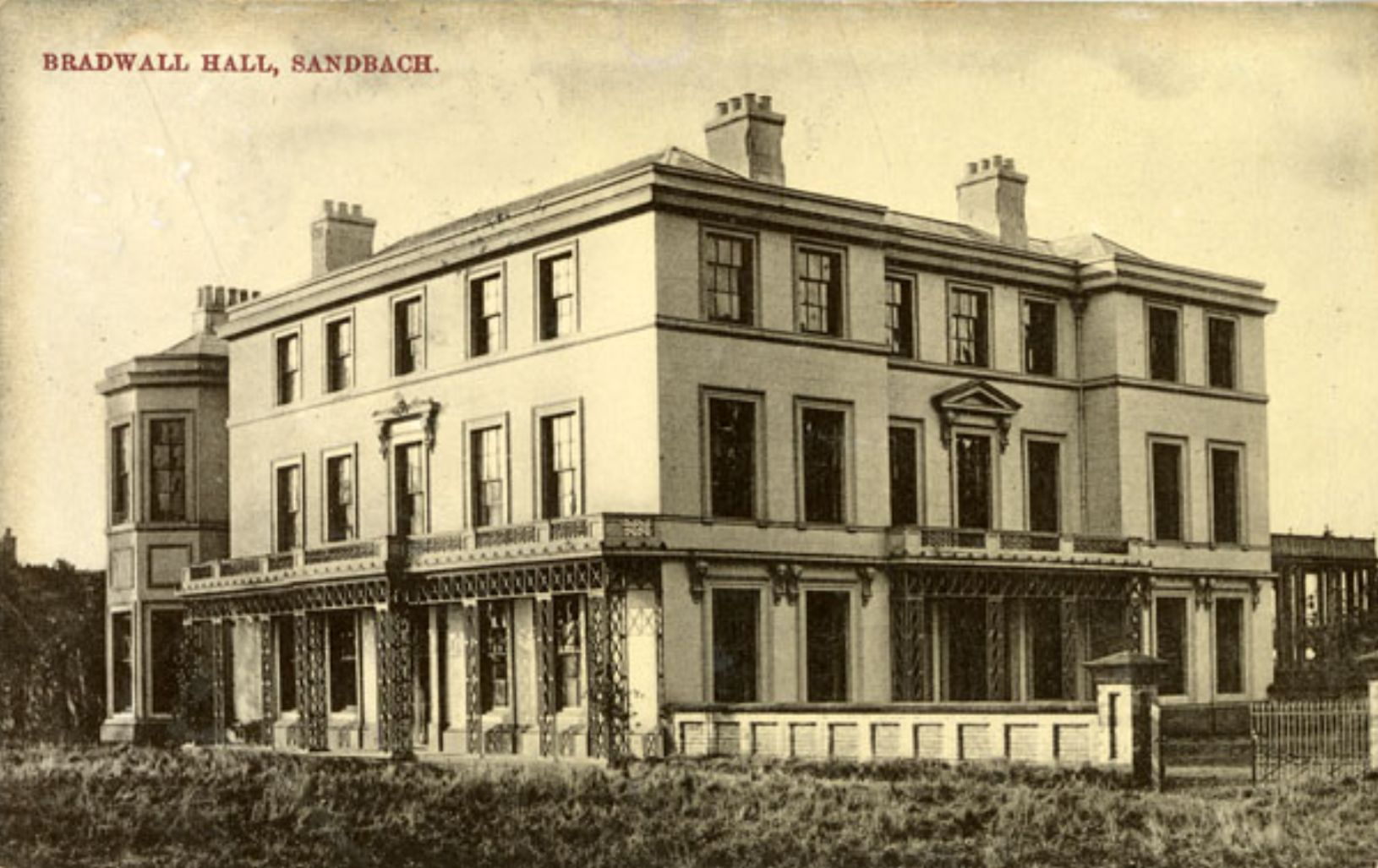
Bradwall Hall, Sandbach, demolished in 1960, seat of the Latham Family

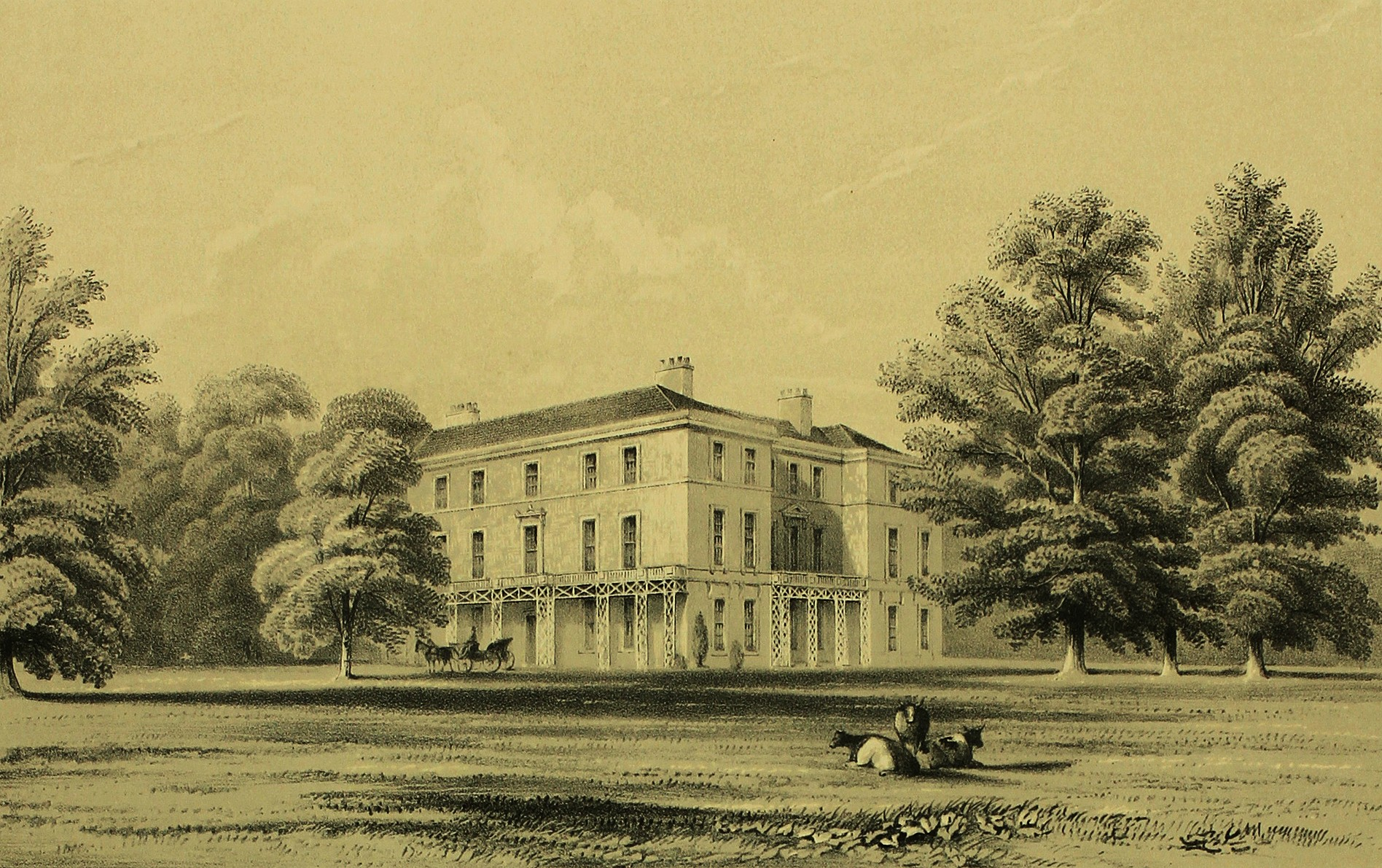
Bradwall Hall, c.1847

Latham of Bradwall is a family whose seat was at Bradwall Hall, in the township of Bradwall, near Sandbach, England, with several notable members. The line is "a junior branch of the ancient Cheshire house of Lathom, of Lathom and Knowsley, which terminated in the heiress, Isabella Latham, who married Sir John Stanley, Knt., ancestor of the Earls of Derby".

== John Latham (1761–1843) ==
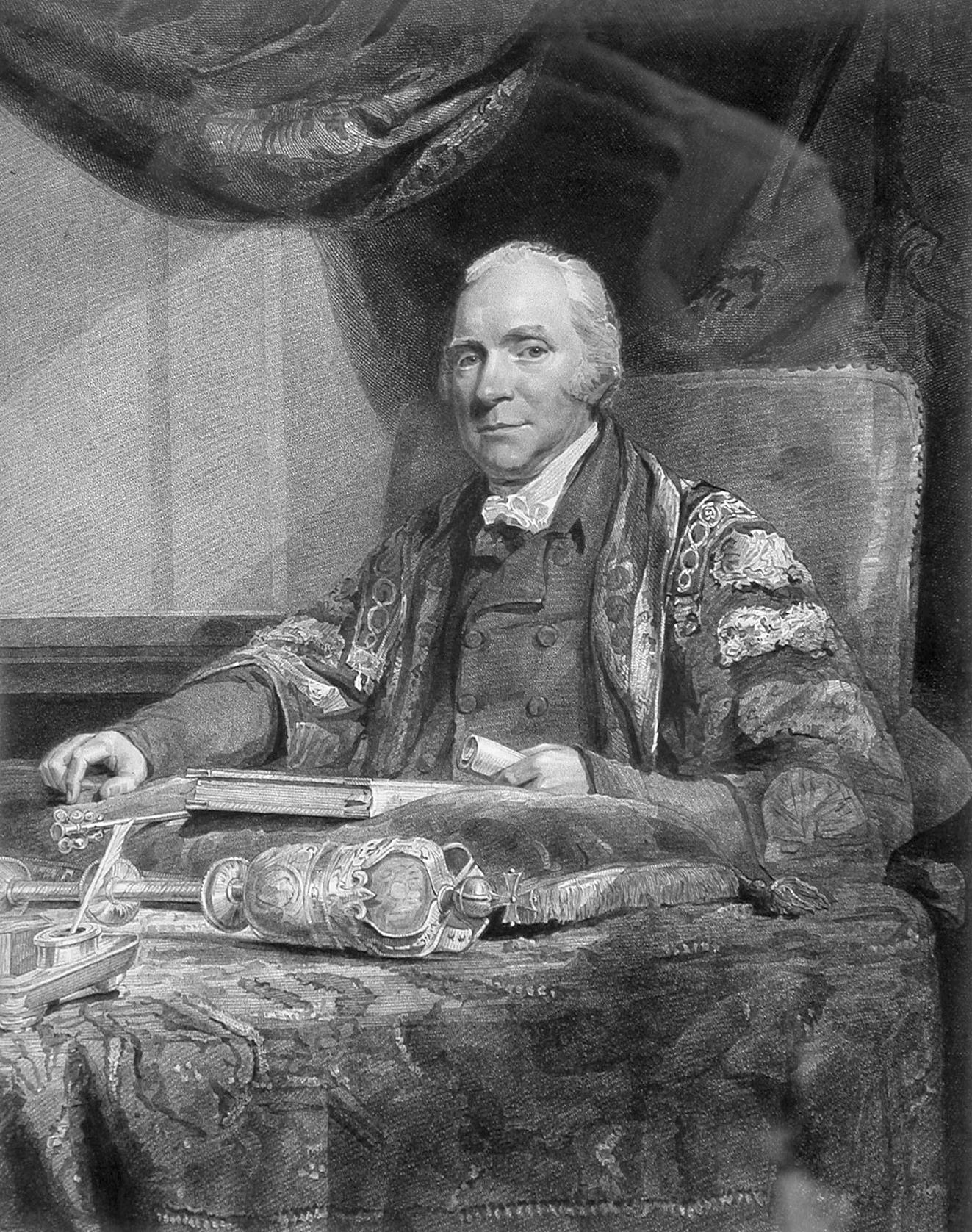
John Latham (1761–1843) President of Royal College of Physicians, by John Jackson.

John Latham, FRS, M.D. (29 December 1761 – 20 April 1843) was a physician who bought the Bradwall estate. He became President of the Royal College of Physicians, and also updated their Pharmacopoeia.

Latham was the eldest son of the Rev. John Latham, B.A. of Oriel College, Oxford, and was born at Gawsworth in the county of Chester, 29 December 1761, in the house of his great-uncle, the Rev. William Hall, then Rector of that parish. He received his early education at the Grammar School of Manchester, under Charles Lawson, A.M., Head Master, and entered Commoner of Brasenose College, Oxford, in 1778, where, having gone through the previous degrees in Arts, he was created M.B. 3 May 1786, and M.D. 10 October 1788. In London, he completed his medical education under David Pitcairn at St. Bartholomew's Hospital.

He passed the first years of his professional life at Manchester and Oxford, where in both places he was elected physician to the respective infirmaries. In 1788 he returned to London, and the next year was admitted Fellow of the College of Physicians. In a few months he was elected physician to the Middlesex Hospital, afterwards to the Magdalen, and in the year 1792, succeeded David Pitcairn at St. Bartholomew's, about which time he settled in Bedford Row, and remained there until 1808, when he moved to Harley Street. In 1790, he was appointed Physician Extraordinary to the Prince of Wales, and afterwards re-appointed to the same office in the household of George IV.

He was a regular attendant at the College of Physicians, where he was elected censor (examiner) in 1790, delivered the Gulstonian lectures in 1793, the Harveian oration in 1794, and the Croonian lecture in 1795. He was President of the College from 1813 to 1819.

In 1801, he bought the estate at Bradwall, in Sandbach and was elected a Fellow of the Royal Society the same year. In 1816 he founded the Medical Benevolent Society. He retired in 1829.

He died on 20 April 1843 at Bradwall Hall, from complications arising from bladder stones, and is buried at St Mary's Church, Sandbach (gravestone). Two portraits of Dr. Latham have been engraved. One is in Dance's collection. The other was engraved by Robert William Sievier, from a painting by John Jackson representing Dr. Latham as President of the College of Physicians. A duplicate of this painting, executed by the same artist, is one of the portraits in the Hall of Brasenose College, Oxford.

On 12 April 1784, he had married Mary, the eldest daughter and co-heiress of the Rev. Peter Mayer, B.A. Vicar of Prestbury, in the county of Chester. They had four daughters and five sons, though only two daughters and three sons survived into adulthood. Among the surviving children were Sarah, John (who inherited the estate), Peter, and Henry.

== John Latham (1787–1853) ==
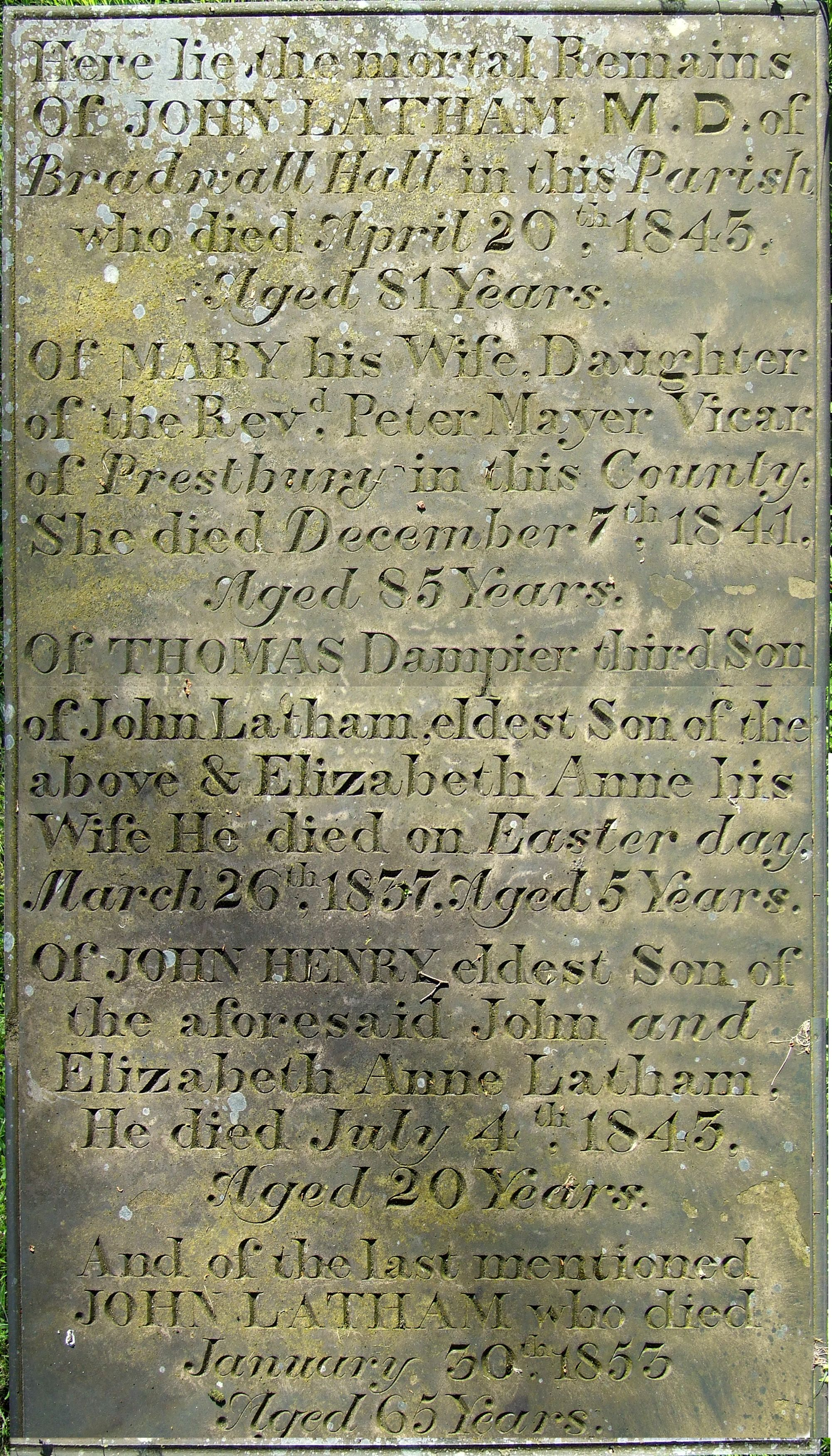
Gravestone of John Latham, his father, and other close family members at St Mary's Church, Sandbach

John Latham (18 March 1787 – 30 January 1853), was a magistrate and poet who is buried in Sandbach. He is the son of John Latham (1761–1843).

Born at Oxford, 18 March 1787, Latham was the eldest son of the late John Latham, M.D., F.R.S., sometime President of the Royal College of Physicians, and, as a coheir of the Cheshire families of Mere and Arderne, derived maternally a recorded descent from most of the ancient houses of that palatinate. He was admitted to Brasenose College, Oxford, in 1803, and during his residence there he obtained the Chancellor's prize for his Latin poem on the subject of Trafalgar in 1806. The same honour was awarded in 1809 and 1812 to the several and successive prize poems of his two younger brothers, namely Dr. Latham, now of Grosvenor-street, and the Rev. Henry Latham, M.A. Vicar of Fittleworth, in Sussex, then resident members of the same college. The same three brothers, in 1844 joined in the presentation of a memorial window to the parish church of Sandbach, in remembrance of their departed parents.

In 1806 Mr. Latham was elected a Fellow of All Souls' College, Oxford, and afterwards proceeded B.C.L. 1810, D.C.L. 1815. He came into possession of his Cheshire estates on the demise of his father, 20 April 1843, and after this, to the close of his life, he continued resident at his paternal seat, discharging his duty as a county magistrate, and taking an active interest in the educational and charitable trusts of his neighbourhood.

Mr. Latham married, on 24 May 1821, Elizabeth-Anne, eldest daughter of Sir Henry Dampier, one of the justices of the King's Bench. In 1839 he sustained the loss of his wife, and this was followed by the death of his eldest son, John Henry Latham, a youth of distinguished classical attainments and rare promise.

Three of his children survived him: George William, of Bradwall Hall, M.A. and barrister-at-law; Francis-Law; and Mary-Frances, wife of the Rev. Ambrose Jones, M.A. incumbent of Elworth, Cheshire. His remains were interred in the family burial place at his parish church of Sandbach, on 3 February 1853.

== Peter Mere Latham (1789–1875) ==
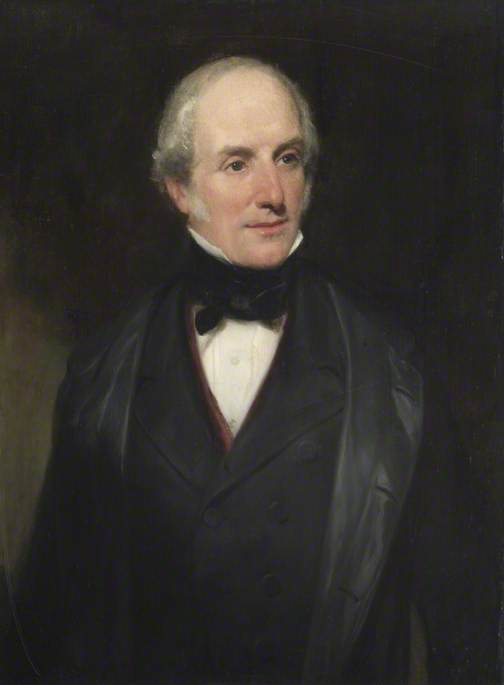
Peter Mere Latham, painting by Henry William Pickersgill c.1850

Peter Mere Latham was a physician and "a great medical educator". The son of John Latham (1761–1843).

He was born on 1 July 1789 in London. Described as "a very delicate child", he attended Sandbach School where he resided with his paternal grandmother (Sarah Latham née Podmore). Around 1796, he was transferred to the Grammar School of Macclesfield, and on to Brasenose College, Oxford in 1807. He took his M.D. degree at Oxford in 1818, and in the same year became a Fellow of the College of Physicians. He delivered their Gulstonian lectures in 1819 and the Harveian oration in 1839.

In 1815 he was elected physician to the Middlesex Hospital, and to St Bartholomew's in 1824. On her accession in 1837, he was appointed physician extraordinary to Queen Victoria. He retired to Torquay in 1865, where he died on 20 July 1875, age 86.

He was married twice. First to Diana Clarissa Chetwynd Stapleton, granddaughter of Lord Chetwynd; she died in 1825, within a year of their marriage. Secondly on 14 February 1833, to Grace Mary Chambers, third daughter of Commander David Chambers, R.N. By her he had four children, two sons, Weyland Mere, Philip Arderne, and two daughters, Diana Frances and Mary Grace.

== Sarah Ormerod (1784–1860) ==
Sarah Ormerod was born Sarah Latham in 1784 to Mary Mayer and John Latham (1761-1843). In 1784 John Latham had married Mary Mayer (born January 7, 1756), the daughter of Reverend Peter Mayer of St. Peter's Church in Prestbury, Cheshire. Sarah Latham was their eldest daughter. She lived the first years of her life in Manchester where her father practiced medicine. At the age of three, she moved to Oxford where John Latham became a physician at the Radcliffe Infirmary. In 1788, the family moved to London and John was elected a fellow of the Royal College of Physicians in 1789 and served as physician extraordinary to the Prince of Wales beginning in 1795. In 1802, he purchased Bradwall Hall in Sandbach, Cheshire and began living in the countryside.

In 1808, Sarah Latham married George Ormerod, a landed Cheshire magistrate and historian. They lived successively in Rawtenstall, Lancashire; Great Missenden, Buckinghamshire; and Damhouse in Astley, Greater Manchester. Their sons Thomas Johnson Ormerod and George Wareing Ormerod were born in 1809 and 1810 respectively. In 1811, the couple moved to Chorlton House, which was situated four miles from Chester and allowed George to research the county for his three-volume History of Cheshire, published between 1816 and 1819. They lived at Chorlton until 1823, and had five more sons and three daughters. Their children were:

- Thomas Johnson Ormerod (1809–74), religious minister, married Maria Susan Bailey (daughter of MP Joseph Bailey).
- George Wareing Ormerod (1810–91), solicitor and geologist, died unmarried.
- John Arderne Ormerod (1813–64), religious minister, died unmarried.
- Susan Mary Ormerod (1814–96), amateur watercolorist, died unmarried.
- Henry Mere Ormerod (1816–98), solicitor, married Madalina Clementina Bowers in 1874.
- William Piers Ormerod (1818–60), anatomist and surgeon, unmarried.
- Edward Latham Ormerod (1819–73), physician, married Mary Olivia Porter in 1853 and Maria Millet in 1856.
- Arthur Stanley Ormerod (1821–84), religious minister, died unmarried.
- Georgiana Elizabeth Ormerod (1822–96), scientific illustrator, died unmarried.
- Eleanor Anne Ormerod (1828–1901), entomologist, died unmarried.

Living in rural Cheshire and, after 1823, at Sedbury Park in Gloucestershire, the Ormerod family was relatively insulated and tight-knit. Sarah Ormerod educated her children herself from an early age. Many of her sons continued their educations at Oxford; educator Thomas Arnold praised their early home education. Ormerod also firmly believed in educating her daughters, though their educations were constricted to traditional subjects and values of upper class English women in the early nineteenth century. She taught them biblical studies, English, French, geography, music, and sewing, as well as drawing. Ormerod also assisted her daughters Susan Mary, Eleanor and Georgiana with their studies of natural history and art. Eleanor Anne Ormerod became a celebrated entomologist who published extensively in her later years and Georgiana became the illustrator of her findings.

Sarah Ormerod was herself a skilled artist and had great interest in botany, which she impressed upon her children and developed through scientific illustration She studied oil painting as a young woman at the encouragement of sculptor and family friend John Flaxman. She engaged watercolorists Copley Fielding and William Hunt in her daughters’ education and produced oil paintings and graphite drawings. Though not widely recognized as an artist during her life, her graphite drawings were exhibited alongside Georgiana Ormerod's entomological watercolors in 2014 at the Natural History Museum, London.

Sarah Ormerod died at 75 years of age on 11 April 1860 and was buried at Sedbury Park, Gloucestershire.

== Charles Latham MRCS LSA (1816–1907) ==
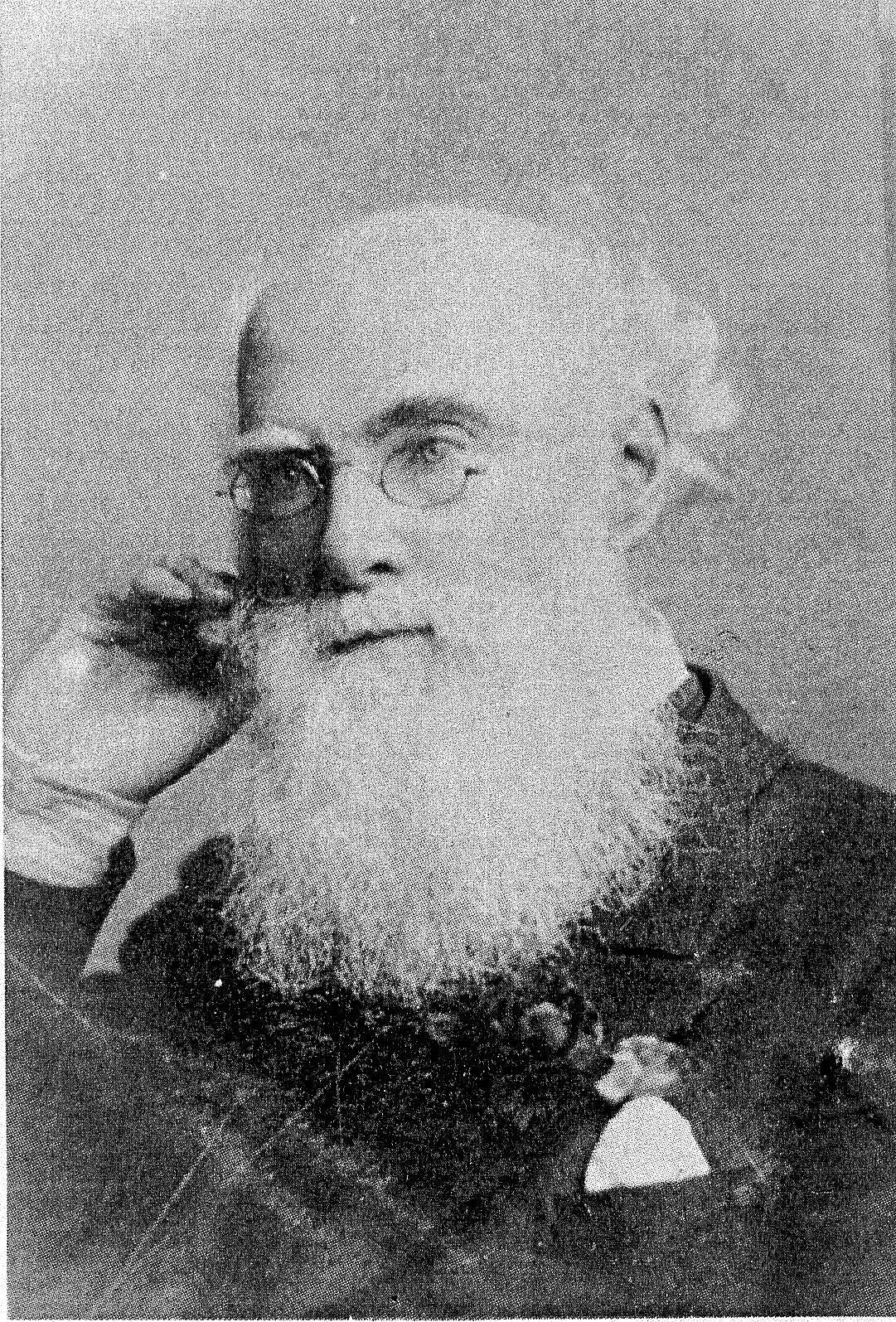
Dr Charles Latham c.1900

Charles Latham MRCS LSA (1816 – 7 July 1907), was a physician, surgeon and registrar from Sandbach. He was a member of the Royal College of Surgeons (MRCS), and in 1839 joined the Worshipful Society of Apothecaries (LSA). On 3 November 1867, Latham delivered triplets to the wife of a brass dealer, which was reported in The Lancet. He died on 6 July 1907, a noted cricket fan. A public memorial statue to him is located outside the Ashfield Primary Care Centre in Sandbach (see photo below). He was affectionately known as "old Dr Latham".

Charles was the third son of Richard and Sarah Latham, and the nephew of John Latham (1761–1843). He went to Manchester Hospital, where he was apprenticed for 5 years to Scottish surgeon, Dr. John Robertson. After his apprenticeship, he became dresser at the Manchester Infirmary, and then moved to London where he obtained the certificates, of M.R.C.S., and L.S.A at St. Bartholomew's Hospital, and then returned to Sandbach, and became a partner with Mr. Sutton. On 29 March 1842, he was appointed medical officer of health for the Sandbach Relief District, a position he held for a period of 57 years, retiring on 22 December 1899. On 25 March 1845 he was appointed medical officer to the District (when the workhouse was opened), a position he held for nearly 60 years. For over 30 years he was public vaccinator, and surgeon to the Bradwall Reformatory from its foundation until 19 March 1903 when he retired. For some time he was also registrar of births and deaths, a duty which he handed over to his son in 1888.

In 1843 he married Miss Mary Newnham Cobbe, daughter of Mr. William Venables Cobbe, of the Hough, near Wybunbury. Their children included Richard Venables Latham (b. 1845), William Henry Latham (b. 1849), Catherine Maria Latham (b. 1851), George Frederick Latham (b. 1852), Louisa Mary Latham (b. 1854), Harry Newham Latham (b. 1856) and Francis Gordon Latham (b. 1857).

== George William Latham (1827–1886) ==
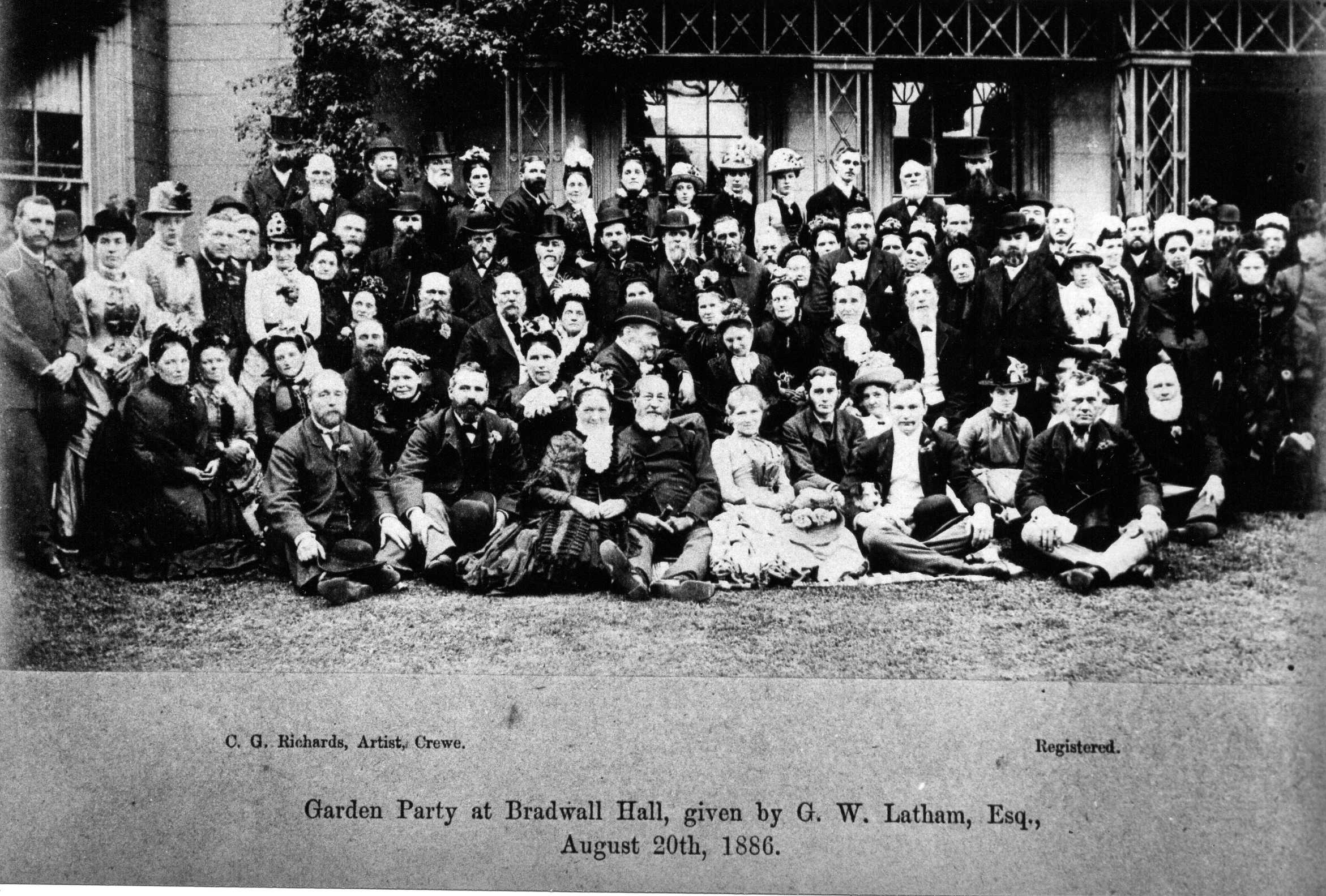
G.W. Latham (1827–1886) garden party at Bradwall Hall on 20 August 1886.

George William Latham, the son of John Latham (1787–1853), was an English landowner, barrister and a Liberal politician.

He was born in London on 4 May 1827. He was educated at Brasenose College, Oxford, matriculating on 22 May 1845, B.A., 1849; M.A., 1852. He was called to the Bar at the Inner Temple in 1852, and for a time practised on the Chester and North Wales circuit.

On ceasing to practise he went to live at Bradwall Hall, and took an active part in the affairs of the county, particularly in relation to reformatory and industrial schools, one of which he established on his own property (Bradwall Reformatory School). He took great interest in agriculture and farming, and was an active member of the Cheshire Chamber of Agriculture.

In politics he was an enthusiastic and advanced Liberal, and in the Parliamentary election of 1878 he contested Mid-Cheshire against Col. Egerton Leigh, by whom he was defeated by a large majority. In 1880 he again contested that constituency, and once more in 1883, but was defeated on both occasions, but by reduced majorities. In 1885 he was, however, elected Member of Parliament for the Crewe division, defeating his opponent, Mr. O. Leslie Stephen, a director of the London and North-Western Railway, by 808 votes. At the next election, in June, 1886, he could not again offer himself as a candidate, owing to serious ill-health, and on 4 October 1886, he died at Bradwall Hall.

== Genealogy ==
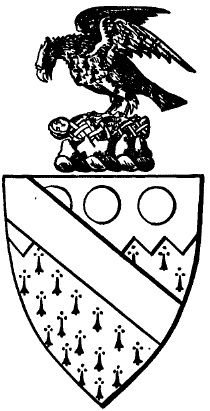
Latham of Bradwall Arms: Erminois on a chief indented azure three bezants, over all a bend Gules. Crest: On a rock proper, an eagle with wings elevated Erminois preying on a child proper, swaddled Azure.

Latham is part of the line of Lathams of Bradwall, a small hamlet close to Sandbach. In 1851, historian George Ormerod (who married Sarah Latham) wrote:

"The account of Latham of Bradwall would, therefore, be imperfect without a summary notice of the houses of the same name, severally of Lathom in Lancashire, and of Astbury in Cheshire. From the parent house the Bradwall family descends in female line through Mere, Arderne, Legh, Savage, and Stanley; and from the Astbury branch it has representative descent through Mere, Davenport, and Somerford".

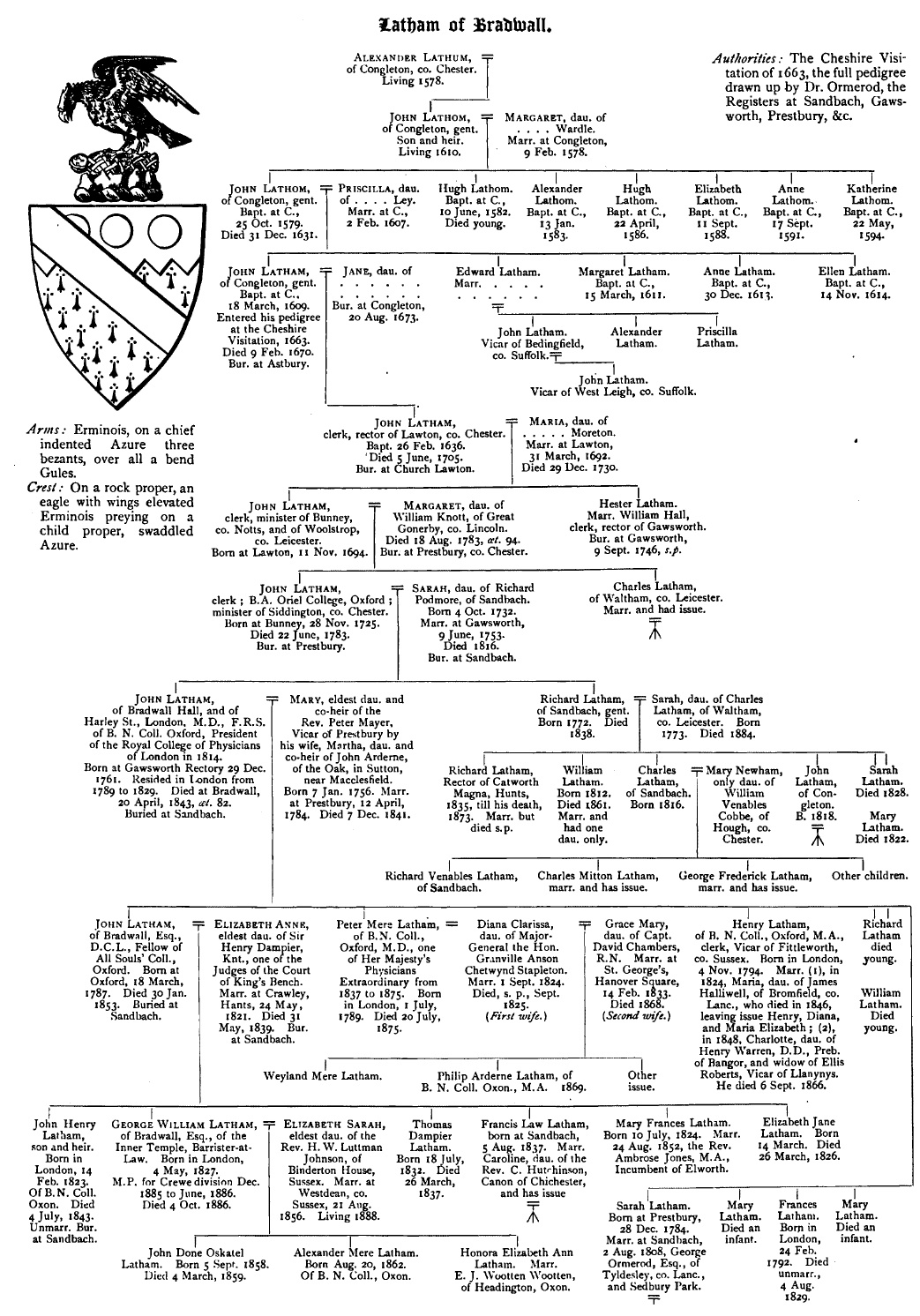

== Bibliography ==
- John Latham, The pharmacopoeia of the Royal College of Physicians of London, (translated by Thomas Healde) Edition 6, Publisher Longman, 1793. (Online at Google books)
- Latham, John, English and Latin poems, 1853, original and translated. T. Richards, Printer, 37 Gt. Queen St., Lincoln's Inn. Not published. (Online at Google books)
- Peter Mere Latham, account of the disease lately prevalent at the General penitentiary, Publisher Underwood, 1825
- Peter Mere Latham, Lectures on subjects connected with clinical medicine, comprising diseases of the heart, Publisher Barrington & Haswell, 1847.
- Robert Martin (Ed.), The collected works of Dr. P.M. Latham, Vol.1 1876, Vol.2 1878, Sydenham Society, London. Online at Archive.org (Vol.1 | Vol. 2)
- Massey, C. (1982) History of Sandbach and District. Johnsons of Nantwich Ltd.
- "John Latham M.D." in William Munk, editor, Roll of the Royal College of Physicians, Volume 2, 1701 to 1800, Published Longman, Green, Longman, and Roberts, 1861, pp. 340
- Williamson, R.T. (1923) English physicians of the past; short sketches of the life and work of Linacre, Gilbert, Harvey, Glisson, Willis, Sydenham, Mead, Heberden, Baker, J. & P.M. Latham, Bright Andrew Reid & Co. Ltd. 96 pp.
- Latham, J. (1796) On rheumatism, and gout; a letter addressed to Sir George Baker Longman 80 pp.
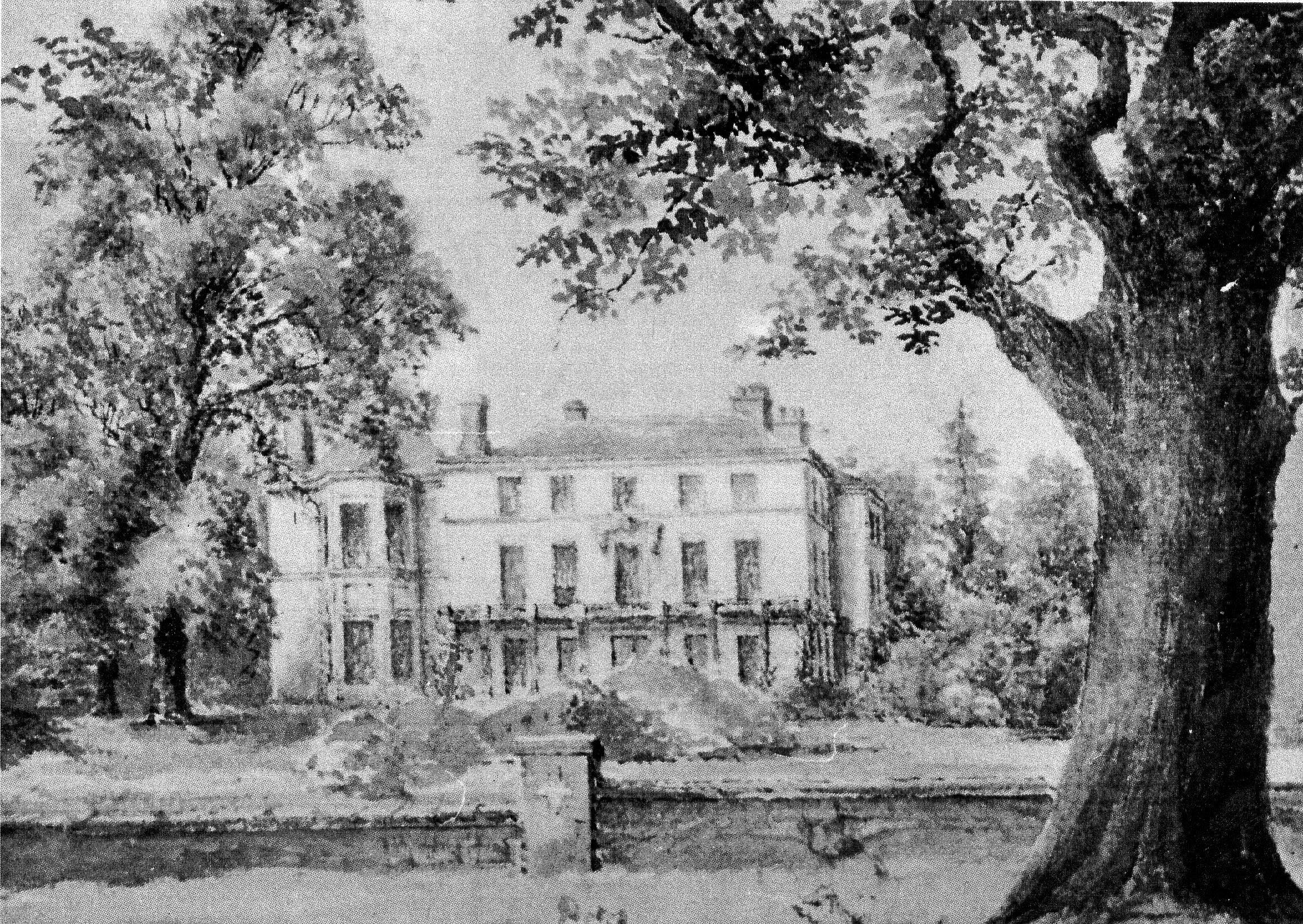
Bradwall Hall, drawing from the 19th Century

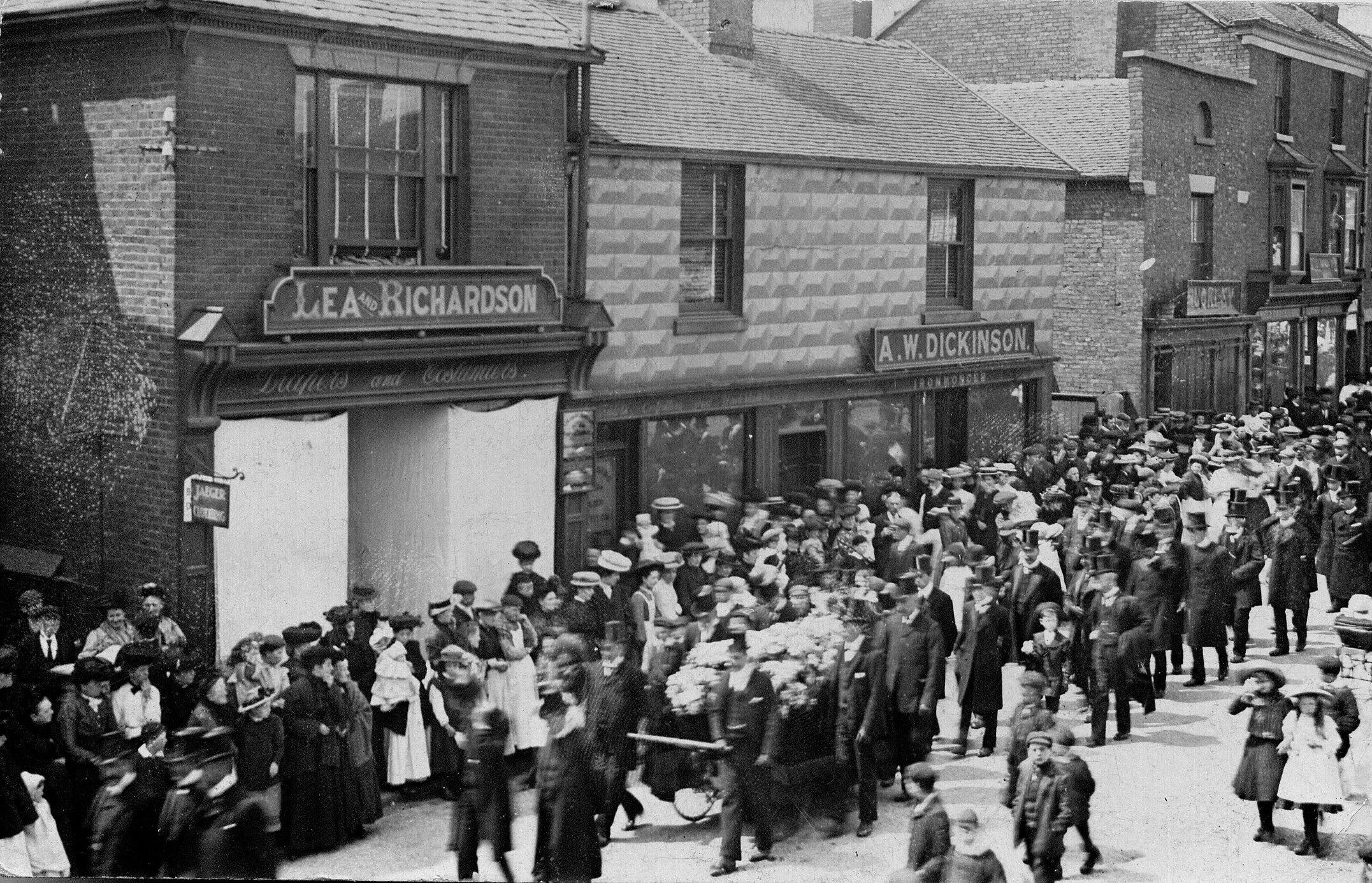
Dr Charles Latham's funeral in July 1907
Alfred W. Dickinson the ironmonger is at 27 High St., and Lea & Richardson, draper at 33/37 High Street, Sandbach (Kelly's 1914). Today, Iceland is at 33/35 High St.

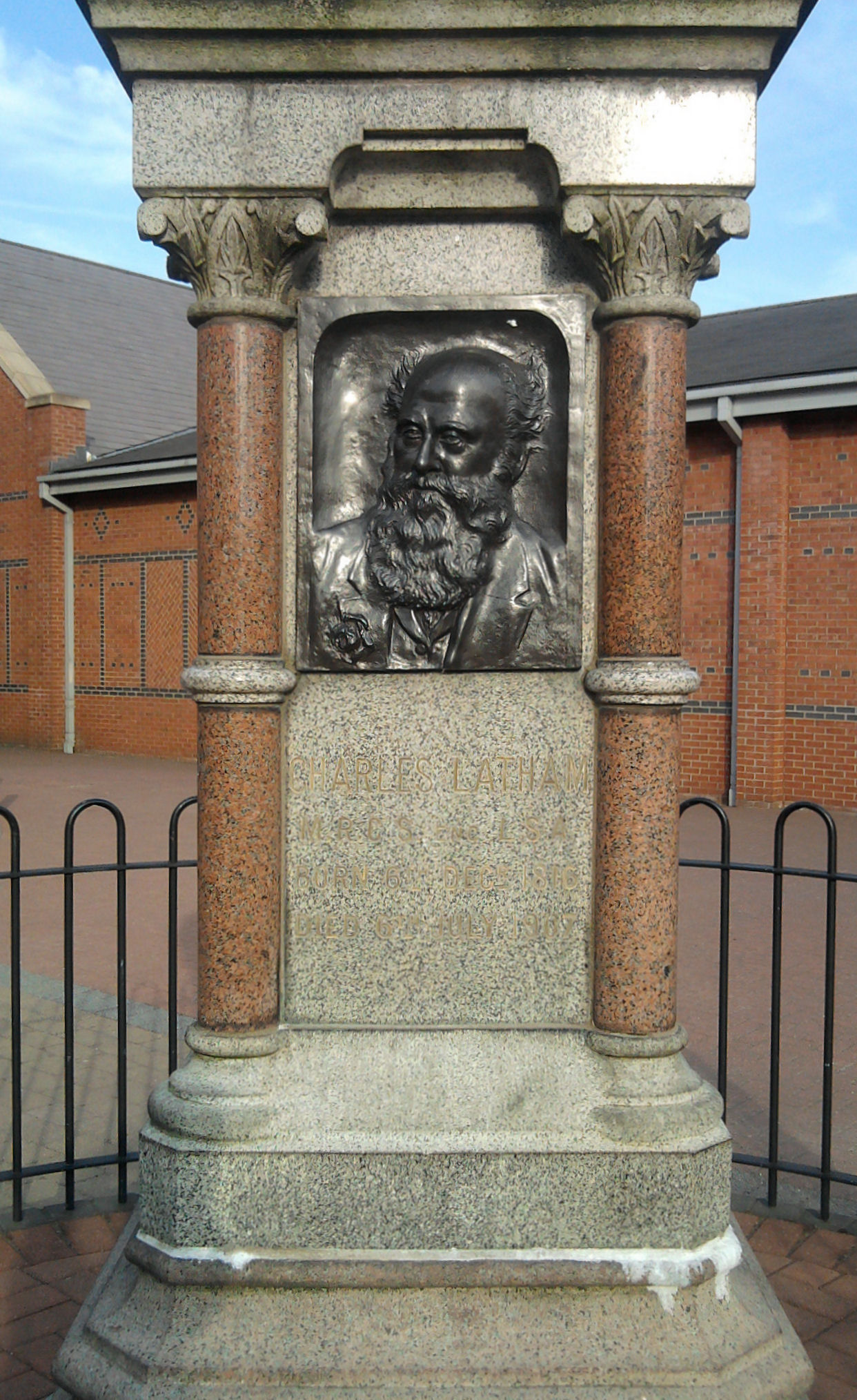
Public memorial statue to Charles Latham
