= Fossil Beach (Sedbury Cliffs) =

Coordinates: 51.6356°N 2.6409°W

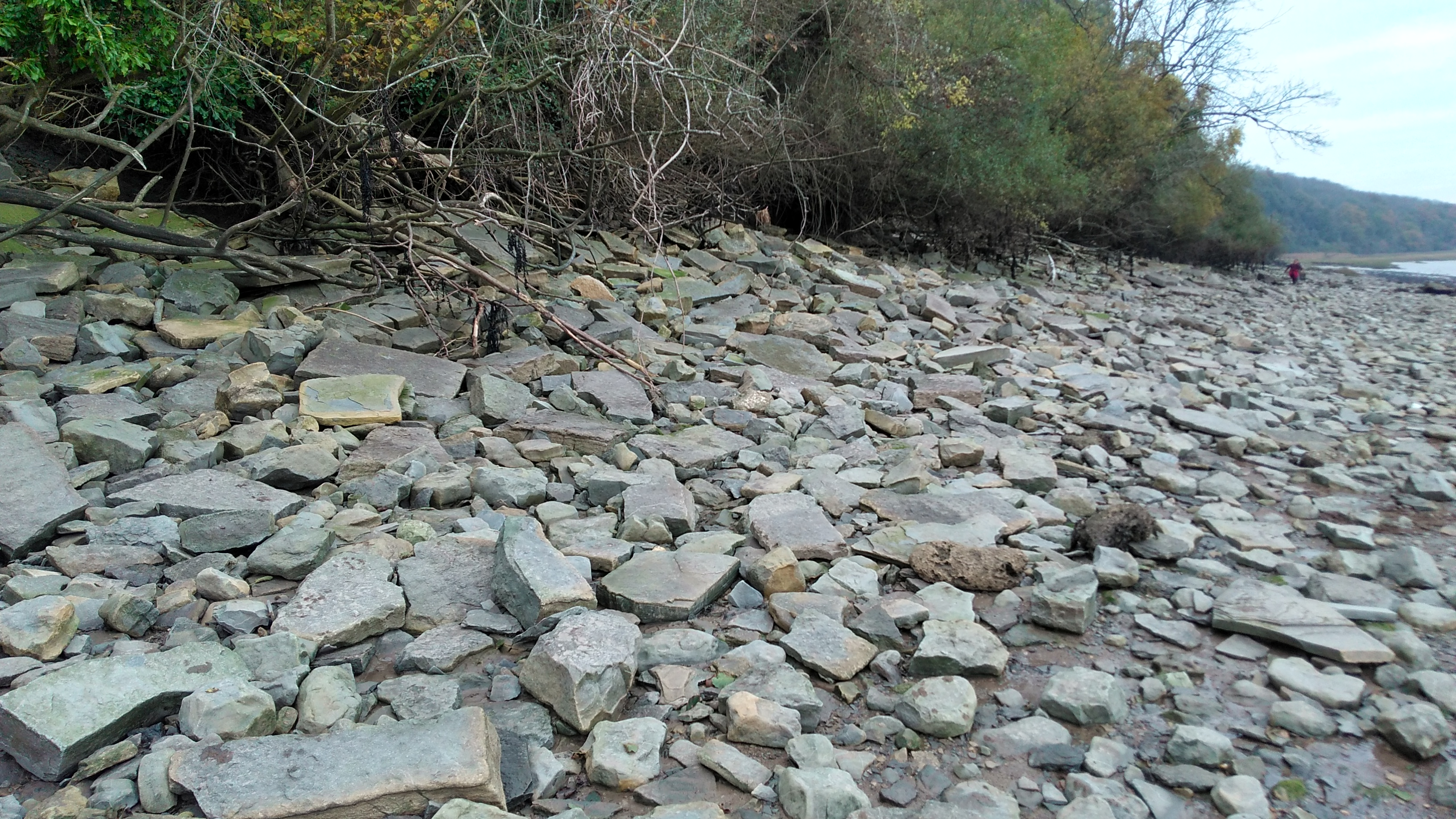
- The beach is covered in fossil-rich limestone and mudstone blocks.

- Location within Gloucestershire
- OS grid reference: ST5574593167
- District: Forest of Dean
- Shire county: Gloucestershire
- Region: South West
- Country: England
- Sovereign state: United Kingdom
- Postcode district: NP16
- Police: Gloucestershire
- Fire: Gloucestershire
- Ambulance: South Western
- UK Parliament: Forest of Dean

Fossil Beach, at Sedbury, Gloucestershire, England, is beneath the Sedbury Cliffs by the River Severn and is known as a rich source of easily discovered fossils. It is within the Severn Estuary Site of Special Scientific Interest (SSSI).

== Access and safety ==
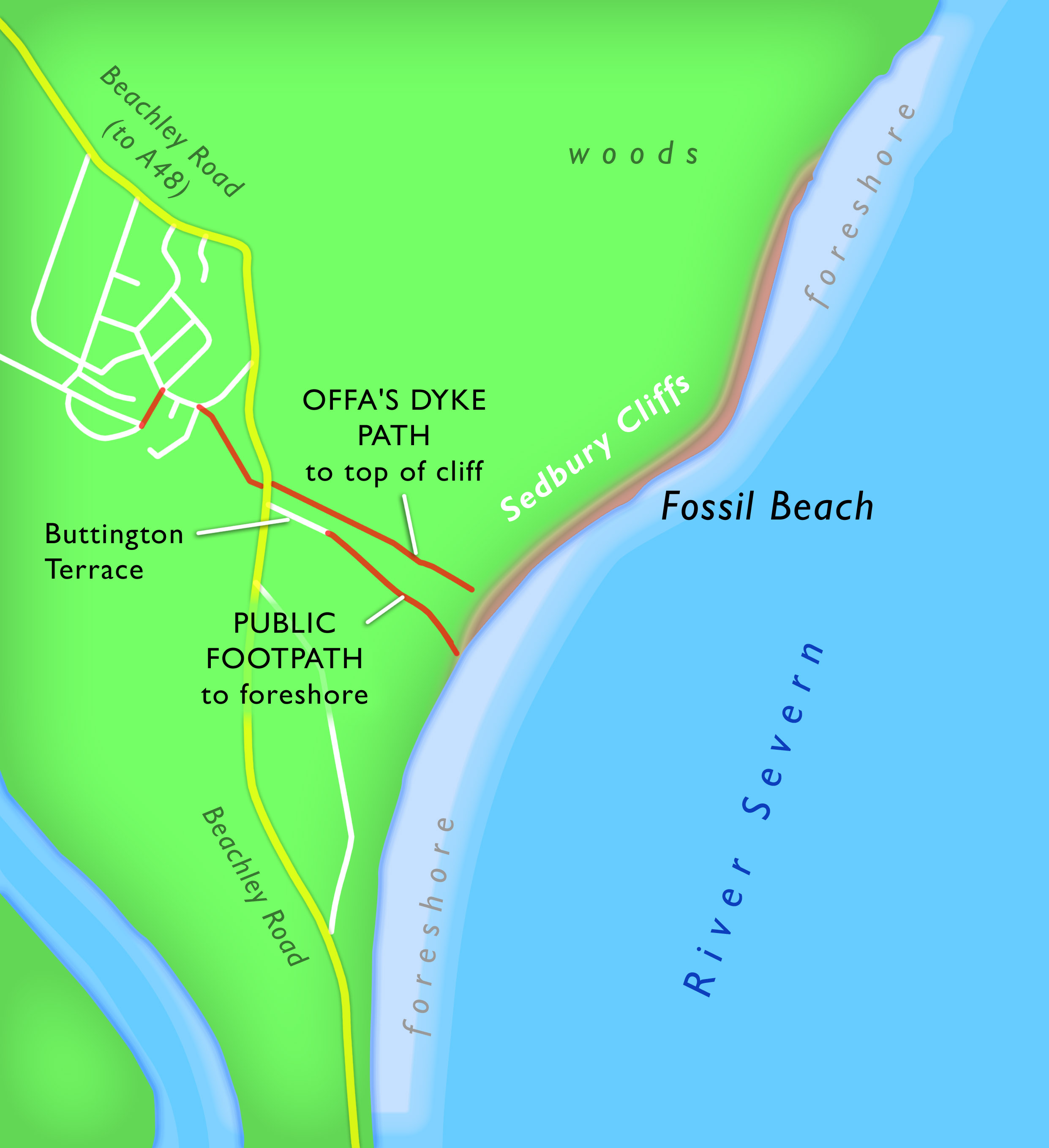
Fossil Beach is accessed via public footpaths leading from Beachley Road.

The grassy flats of the coast are accessible from the public footpaths, which lead from Beachley Road (by the bus stop) through the fields and woods, the easiest from the end of Buttington Terrace through two galvanised kissing gates for about 500m, but also from the end of the Offa's Dyke Path. Fossil Beach is then about a 700-m walk to the left, north-east along the coastal grass and through the reeds; the walk is frequently marshy and muddy so Wellington boots are recommended. Larger rocks can be slippery to walk on (Universal Transverse Mercator coordinates: 31U 475148 5720571; latitude/longitude: 51.63560 N, 2.64090 E; ST5574593167). The foreshore is subject to the broad tidal range of the Severn Estuary so it is advisable to check the times beforehand so that visits occur around low tide: much of the shore is covered in the silty mud common to the tidal flats of the area.

As the shoreline and cliffs are designated as an SSSI, digging at the cliffs is not permitted and is dangerous and pointless for fossil-hunting given the extreme paucity of examples in the bulk of the mudstone: the cliffs are relatively soft and easily weathered, with parts subject to notable expansion and contraction (during very wet periods, e.g. after Storm Ciara and Storm Dennis which led to flooding in places, temporary streams appear from the base of the cliff) . The abundant rocks lying about from previous rock falls contain plenty of Jurassic and Triassic fossiliferous species in any case.

== Geology ==
Sedbury Cliffs and the foreshore contain similar geological layering to the more famous and visible Aust Cliff on the opposite bank of the River Severn. However, at Sedbury the cliffs are wooded at the top and overgrown with bushes and trees at the base, with fallen blocks and old trunks amongst them. Farther along the beach from the grass, sandstone blocks become more common.

The highest rock layer is the brown rocks of the Blue Lias formation, which was deposited between the Rhaetian Age (which closed the Triassic Period 201.3 million years ago (mya)) and the Ages of the Hettangian (201.3 to 199.3 mya) and Sinemurian (199.3 to 190.8 mya), the first two ages of the Jurassic Period. The Blue Lias contains limestone, mudstone and siltstone, and this formation comprises the lower boundary of the Lias Group. The lias here can be thicker than at Aust. Lias contains clays highly prone to expansion and contraction which aid landslip and collapse, therefore helping to facilitating the release of accessible fossils.

The lias lies upon the pale grey Cotham member of the Lilstock Formation, which itself lies on the darker grey Westbury Formation. The Lilstock and Westbury formations, containing shale, limestone and sandstone, are included in the parent Penarth Group and they were deposited in the Rhaetian Age (208.5 to 201.3 mya) of the Triassic Period.

The next layer down is made up of the pale greenish- or bluish-grey mudstones and siltstones of the Blue Anchor Formation which, at the boundary, can share some of the same features with the overlying Westbury rocks. The Blue Anchor rocks lie atop the Branscombe Formation which comprises the substantial reddish-brown mudstone and siltstone with some greenish-grey 'reduced' patches similar in appearance to the Blue Anchor rock. The Blue Anchor and Branscome Formations, both laid down between the Norian (227 to 208.5 mya) and the Rhaetian ages, are included in the parent Mercia Mudstone Group (deposited from the early Triassic Period to the Rhaetian Age) which underlies much of the area, colouring the soil, and extending far north-east into Northern England.

Terrain and cliff layering
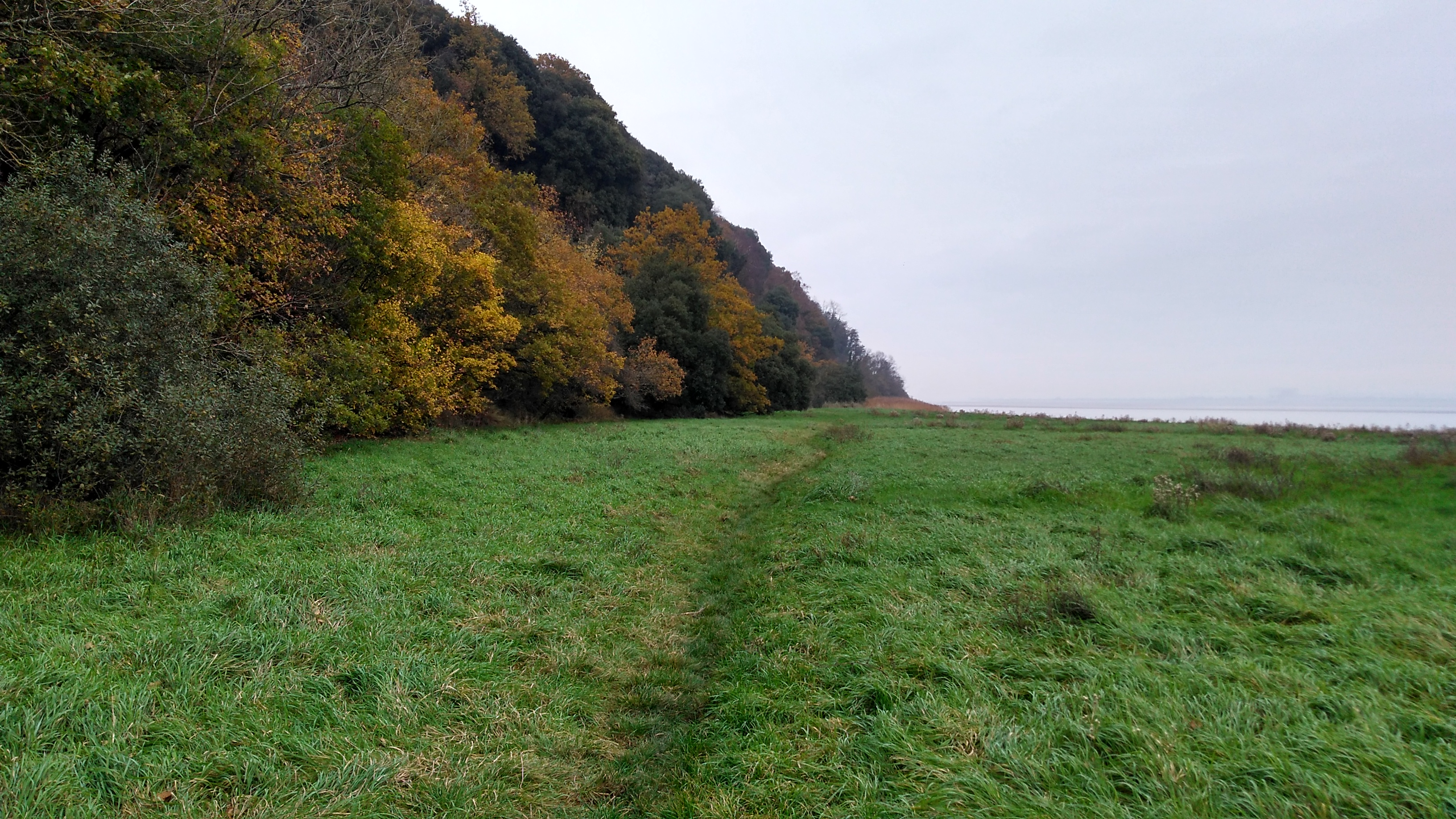
The approach to Fossil Beach, with the tree-lined base of Sedbury Cliffs to the left. The reeds are just visible in the distance.

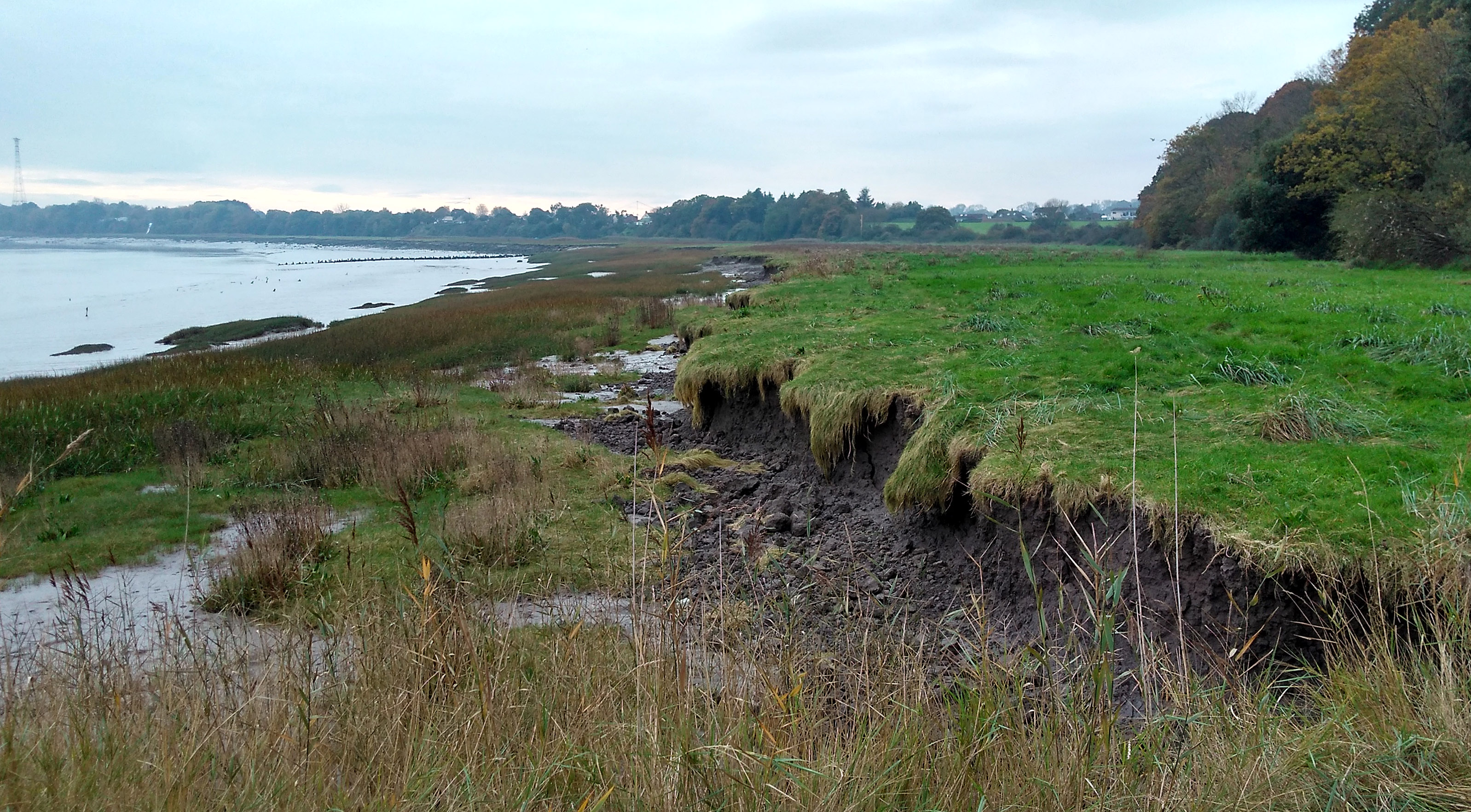
Looking back south-south west, showing the exposed tidal flats, salt marsh area and eroded edge of the grassy approach.

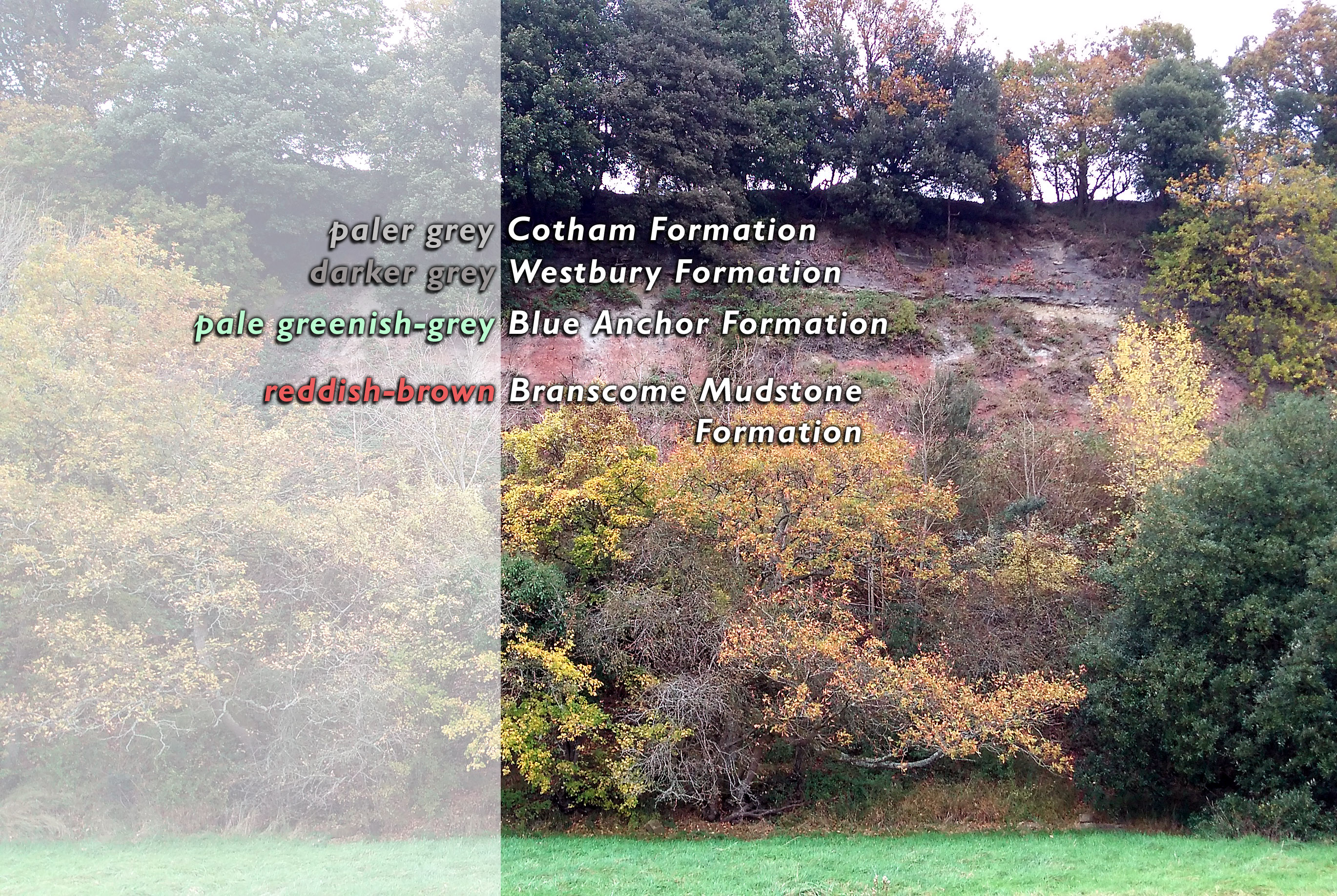
Labelled sequential layers in part of the cliffs at Sedbury. The change in colour from the Mercia Mudstone (lower two layers) to the fossil-containing grey Westbury and Cotham beds is clear.

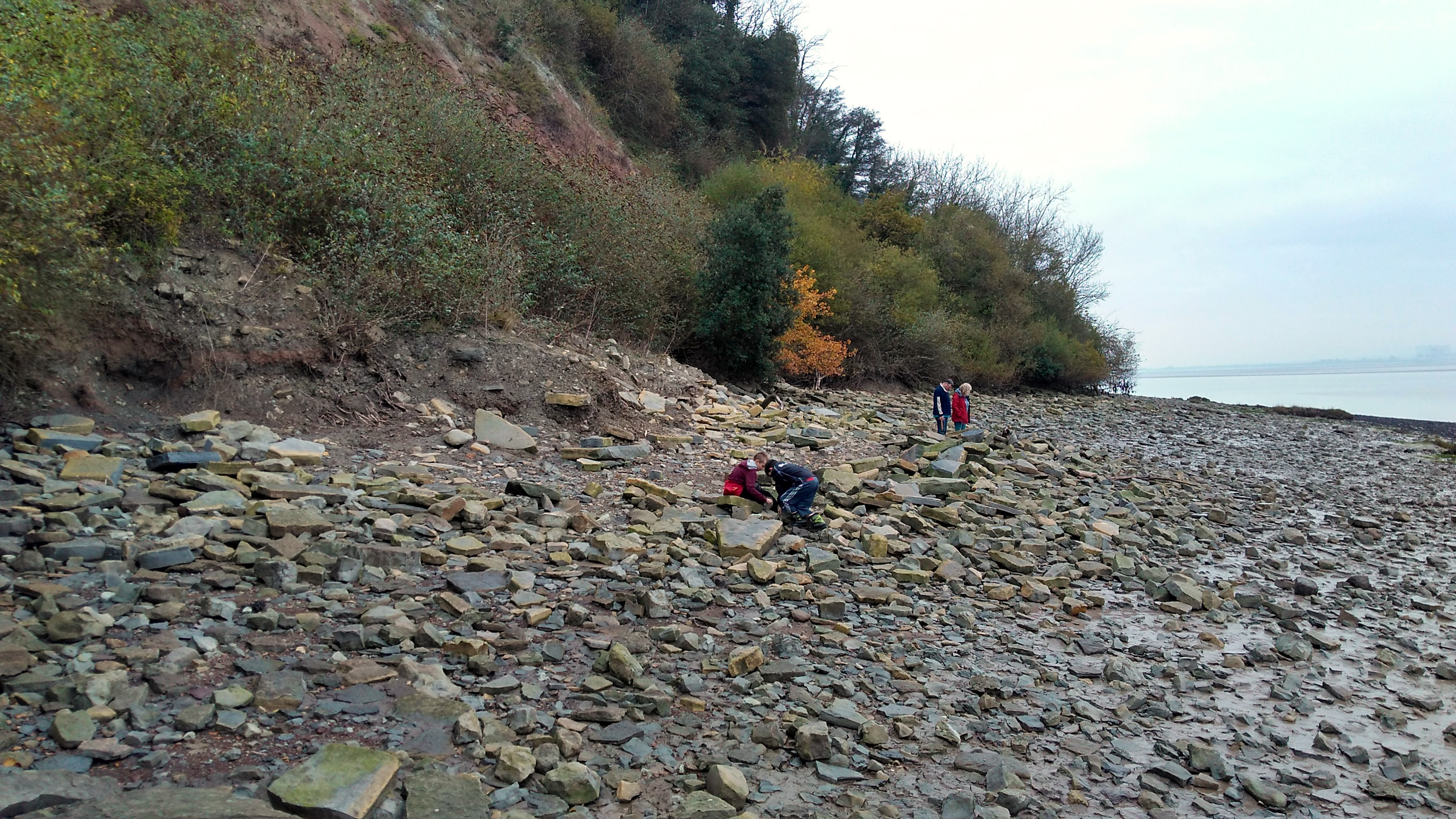
A recent cliff fall has been partially overgrown to the left of this part of the beach.

== Types of fossil ==
The layers of rock in the cliff were formed in shallow, sub-tropical seas when this region was closer to the equator. The fossils to be found on the foreshore are largely from the beds of Blue Lias, Lilstone and Westbury formations from the top of the cliff and reflect the marine nature of the deposits. Jurassic ammonites, brachiopods, bivalves and other sea organisms with shells are found in the collapsed rock. It is possible, although rarer, to find Triassic bones and sharks' teeth embedded in suitable 'bone rock'. The base of the Westbury formation is the Westbury Bone Bed, known for containing fossils of fish, reptiles and of course bivalves .

Fossils found
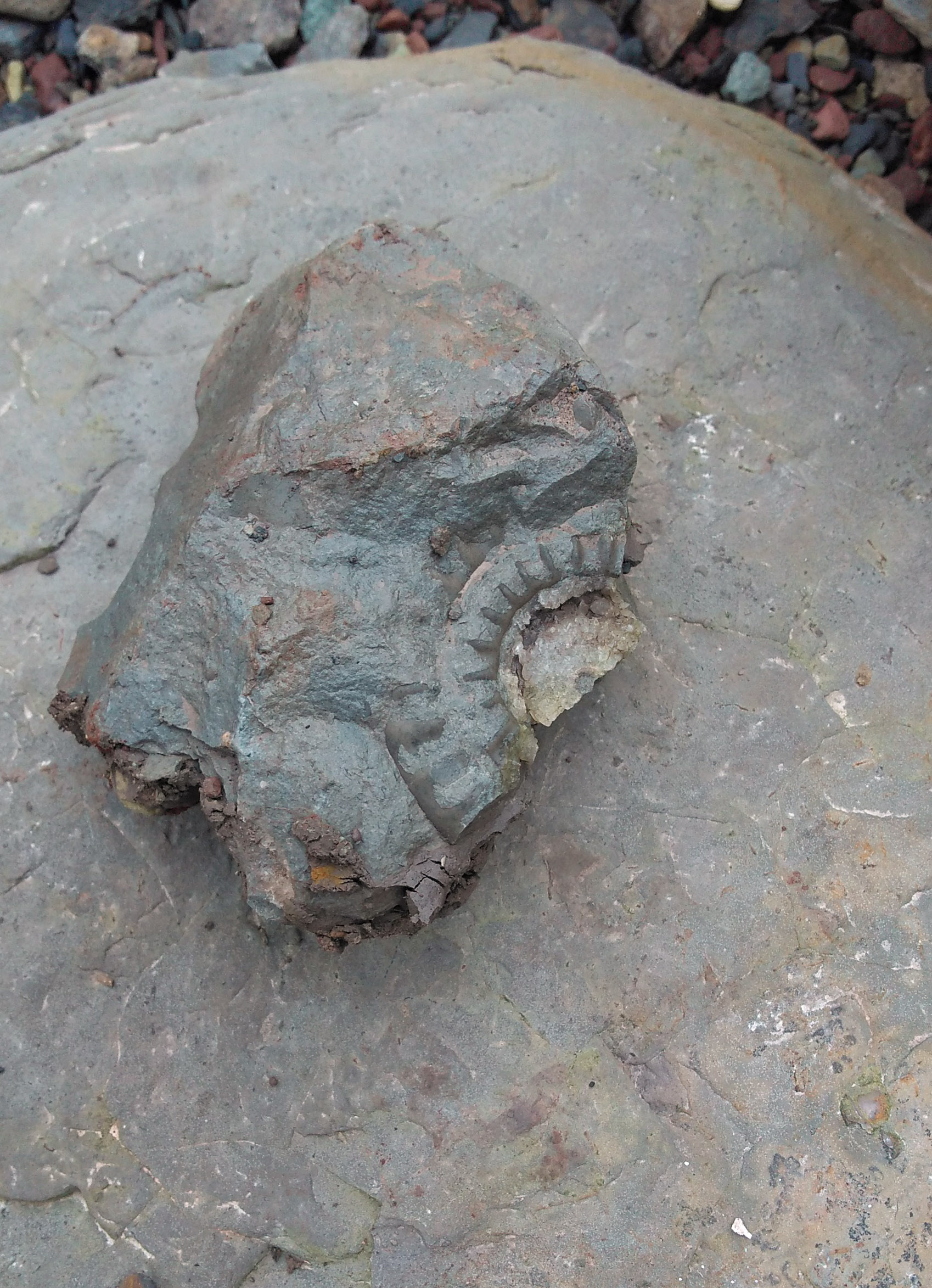
Part of an embedded ammonite fossil, 3.5cm, with a calcite centre.

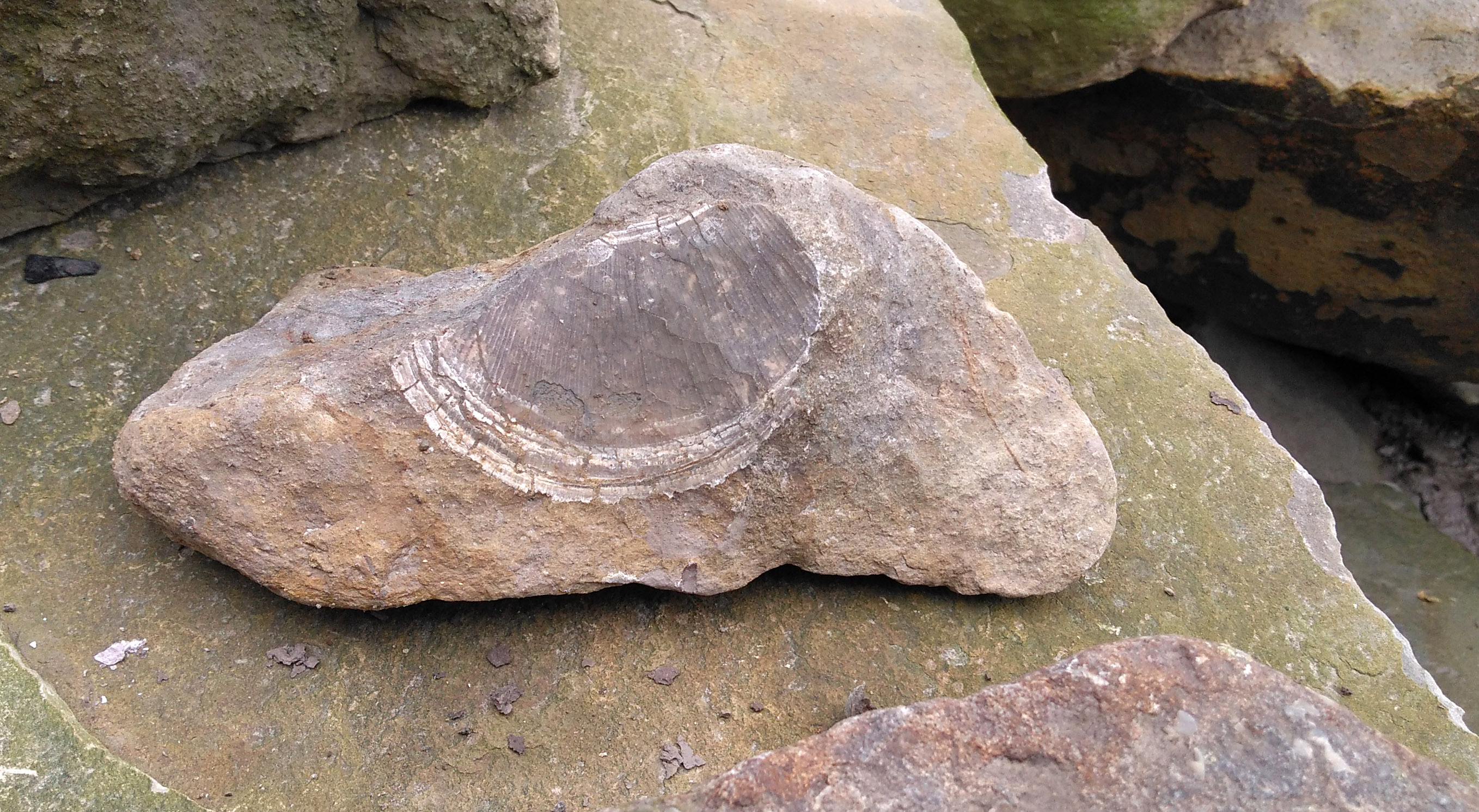
An 8 cm bivalve fossil exposed.

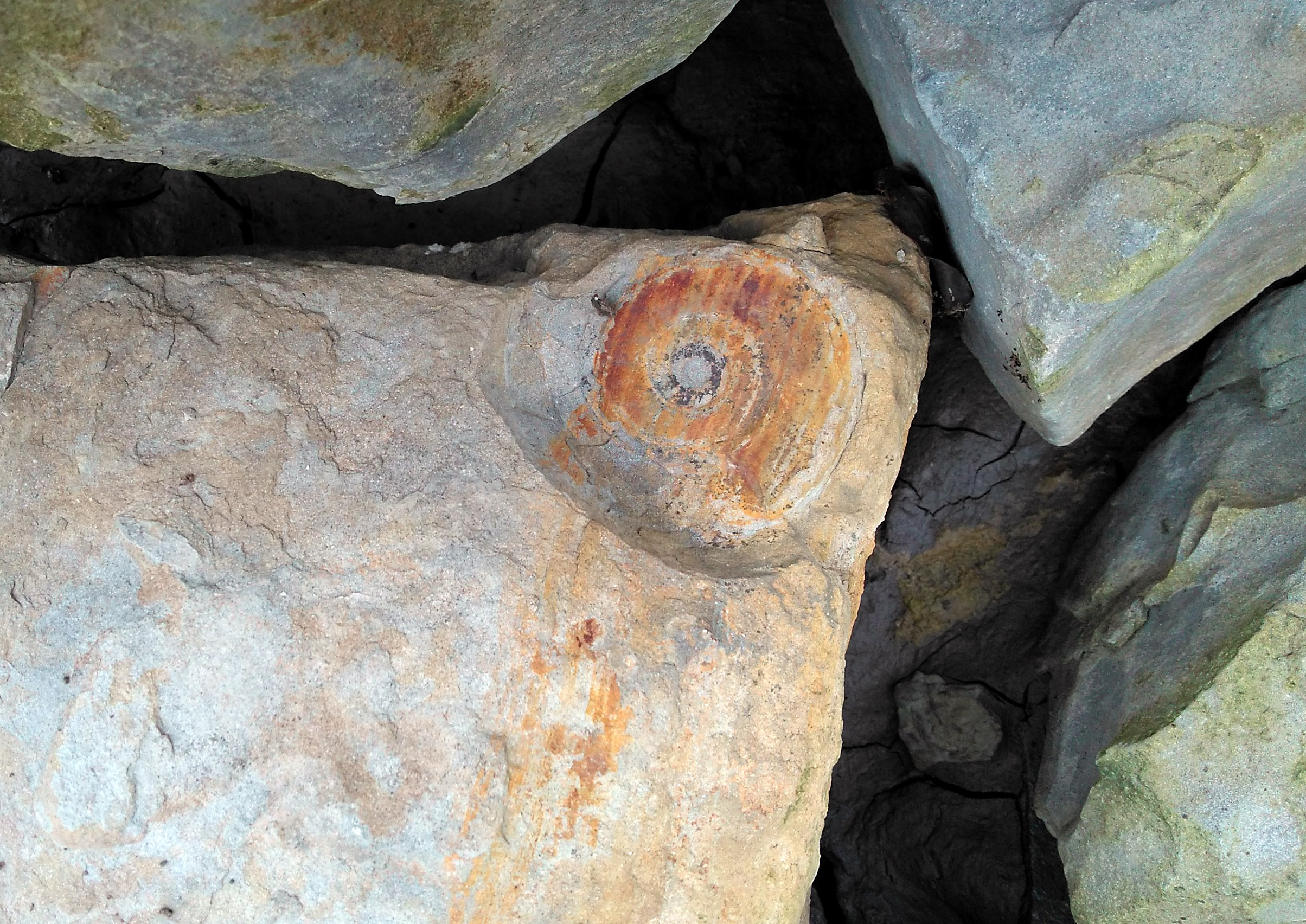
An ammonite, 4cm, with oxidised iron banding in the rock.

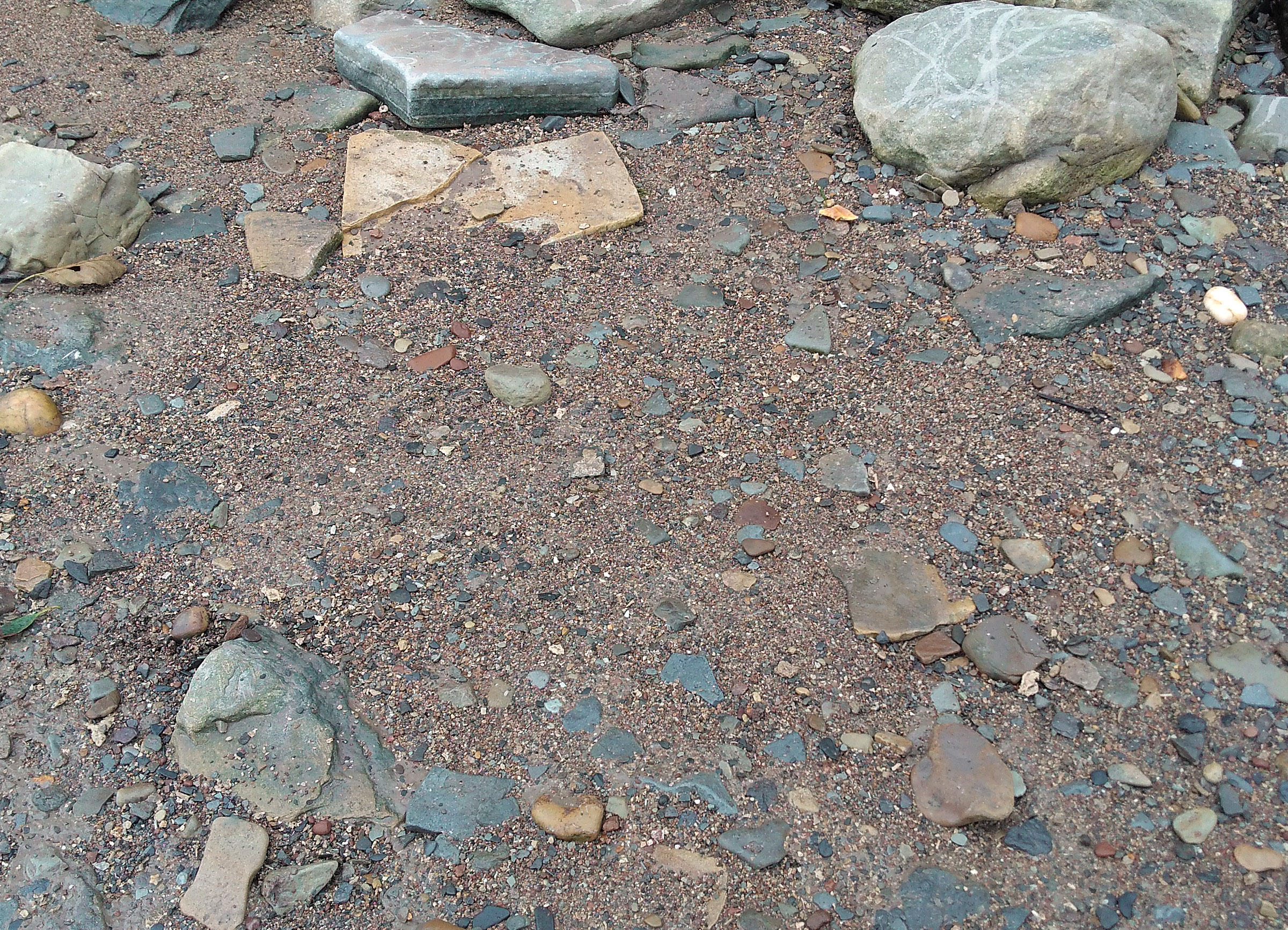
Silty material on the beach, containing centimetre to sub-millimetre fragments of crinoids and other fossils of approximately 200mya.

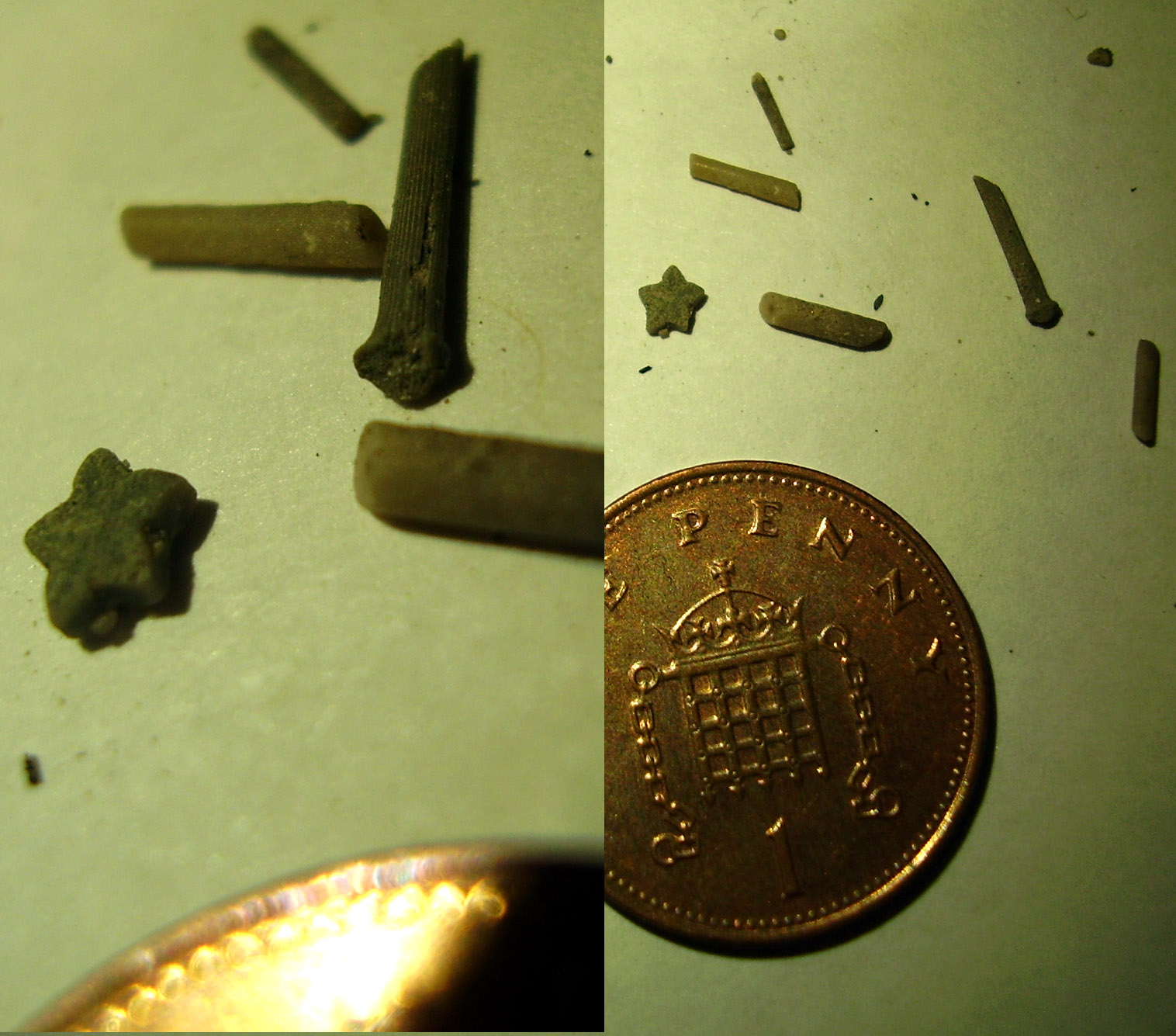
Fragments of fossil crinoid from the very top of the foreshore of Fossil Beach, next to a penny for scale.

Often overlooked is the fine sandy material amongst the pebbles on the foreshore, particularly further along the beach round the headland. This material, when sifted through, is an excellent source of tiny crinoid fossils, with the familiar sorting in this location into tubes and star-shaped segments - sometimes in stacks of several at a time - and can be easily found by the keen eyes of children or by using a hand lens.
