= Ormrod =

Ormrod is an English-language surname, likely of toponymic origin. Orthographical variations include Ormerod. Notable people with the surname include:

- Alan Ormrod (born 1942), English cricketer
- Anne Ormrod (born 1987), New Zealand footballer
- Mark Ormrod (athlete) (born 1982), Australian athlete
- Mark Ormrod (historian) (1957–2020), Welsh historian
- Mark Ormrod (Royal Marine) (born 1983), British triple amputee
- Roger Ormrod (1911–1992), English judge
- William L. Ormrod (1863–1921), American politician

== See also ==
- Ormerod
