= Joseph Arderne Ormerod =

English physician, neurologist, and psychiatrist (1848–1925)

Joseph Arderne Ormerod FRCP (7 April 1848, Starston, Norfolk – 5 March 1925) was an English physician, neurologist, and psychiatrist.

After education at Rugby School, Joseph Ormerod matriculated at Corpus Christi College, Oxford, graduating there B.A. 1871. He was elected to a fellowship at Jesus College, Oxford and qualified B.M. Oxon. in 1875 at the medical school of St Bartholomew's Hospital. He received house appointments there and was also a staff member of the Metropolitan Free Hospital and (what was later named) the Royal Northern Hospital. From 1878 to 1893 Ormerod worked at the City of London Hospital for Diseases of the Chest. At St Bartholomew's Hospital he became assistant physician in 1893, physician in 1904, and consulting physician in 1913. During WW I, he was physician to King George's Hospital, Stamford Street.

Ormerod was elected F.R.C.P. London in 1885. He contributed articles to Clifford Allbutt's A System of Medicine and other medical literature, chiefly concerning diseases of the nervous system. He delivered the Harveian Oration (On Heredity in relation to Disease) in 1908 and the Lumleian Lectures (Some Modern Theories concerning Hysteria) in 1914.

== Family ==
One of his uncles was Edward Latham Ormerod, F.R.C.P. In 1878 Joseph Ormerod married Mary Ellen, third daughter of Edward Milner of Dulwich. The marriage produced four sons and four daughters. His second son, Henry Arderne Ormerod, became a professor of Greek at the University of Leeds. In 1912 Joyce Ormerod, one of Joseph Ormerod's daughters. married John Brian Christopherson, a pioneer of chemotherapy.

His eldest son was Lieutenant Colonel George Milner Ormerod later Chief Constable of East Sussex.
