= John Latham (1761–1843) =

English physician (1761–1843)

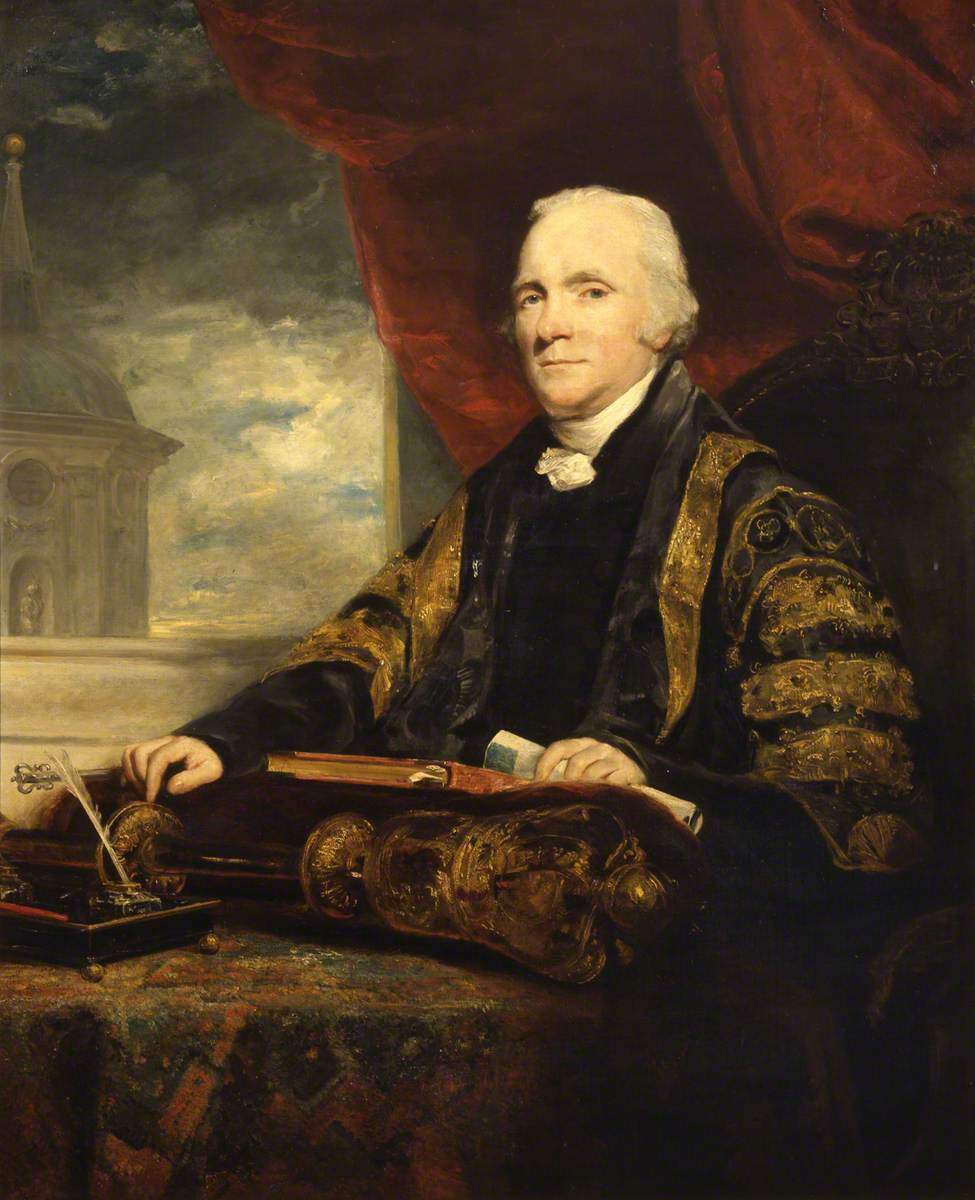
John Latham, 1816 engraving

John Latham (29 December 1761 – 20 April 1843) was an English physician. He was physician extraordinary to the Prince of Wales from 1795 and later to George IV. He became President of the Royal College of Physicians (1813–1819), and also updated their Pharmacopoeia.

== Life ==
Latham was the eldest son of the Rev. John Latham, B.A. of Oriel College, Oxford, and was born at Gawsworth in the county of Chester, 29 December 1761, in the house of his great-uncle, the Rev. William Hall, then Rector of that parish. He received his early education at Manchester Grammar School, under Charles Lawson, A.M., Head Master, and entered Commoner of Brasenose College, Oxford, in 1778, where, having gone through the previous degrees in arts, he was created M.B. 3 May 1786, and M.D. 10 October 1788. In London, he completed his medical education under David Pitcairn at St Bartholomew's Hospital.

Latham passed the first years of his professional life at Manchester and Oxford, where in both places he was elected physician to the respective infirmaries. In 1788 he returned to London, and the next year was admitted Fellow of the College of Physicians. In a few months he was elected physician to the Middlesex Hospital, afterwards to the Magdalen, and in the year 1792, succeeded David Pitcairn at St. Bartholomew's, about which time he settled in Bedford Row, and remained there until 1808, when he moved to Harley Street. In 1790, he was appointed Physician Extraordinary to the Prince of Wales, and afterwards re-appointed to the same office in the household of George IV.

On 12 April 1784, Latham married Mary, the eldest daughter and co-heiress of the Rev. Peter Mayer, B.A. Vicar of Prestbury, in the county of Chester. They had four daughters and five sons, though only two daughters and three sons survived into adulthood. Among the surviving children were Sarah, John (who inherited the estate), Peter, and Henry. Latham's eldest daughter Sarah married George Ormerod and their daughter Eleanor Ormerod was the noted entomologist.

In 1801, he bought the estate at Bradwall, in Sandbach and was elected a Fellow of the Royal Society the same year. Latham was a regular attendant at the College of Physicians, where he was elected censor (examiner) in 1790, delivered the Gulstonian lectures in 1793, the Harveian oration in 1794, and the Croonian lecture in 1795. He was president of the college from 1813 to 1819. In 1816 he founded the Medical Benevolent Society. He retired in 1829.

== Diabetes ==
Latham supported John Rollo's low-carbohydrate meat diet to treat diabetes and in 1811 authored Facts and Opinions Concerning Diabetes. Latham consulted 41 cases of diabetes of which 19 died and only four recovered on a meat diet.

== Death ==
He died on 20 April 1843 at Bradwall Hall, from complications arising from bladder stones, and is buried at St Mary's Church, Sandbach (gravestone). Two portraits of Dr. Latham have been engraved. One is in Dance's collection. The other was engraved by Robert William Sievier, from a painting by John Jackson representing Dr. Latham as President of the College of Physicians. A duplicate of this painting, executed by the same artist, is one of the portraits in the Hall of Brasenose College, Oxford.

== Selected publications ==
- On Rheumatism and Gout (1796)
- Facts and Opinions Concerning Diabetes (1811)
