= John Brian Christopherson =

John Brian Christopherson CBE
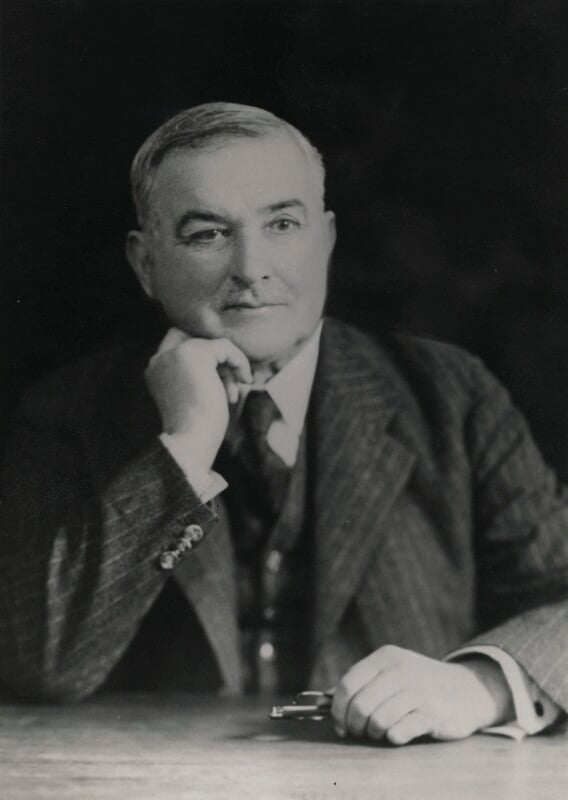
- Christopherson in 1948
- Born: 30 April 1868; Batley, Yorkshire, United Kingdom
- Died: 21 July 1955 (aged 87); Lydney on Severn, United Kingdom
- Citizenship: United Kingdom
- Known for: cure for bilharzia
- Scientific career
- Fields: Medicine

John Brian Christopherson CBE (30 April 1868 – 21 July 1955), was a British physician and a pioneer of chemotherapy.

The son of Canon Brian Christopherson, Christopherson was born in Batley, Yorkshire, United Kingdom, in 1868. He went to the Royal Grammar School, Newcastle, Clifton College and studied at Gonville and Caius College, Cambridge. He received his final medical training at St Bartholomew's Hospital. He received his Bachelor of Medicine, Bachelor of Surgery in 1893 and joined the Fellowship of the Royal College of Surgeons.

Between 1896 and 1902 he worked at the Albert Dock Seamen's Hospital. In 1902 first he became physician to the Governor-General of the Sudan. Later, in 1904, he became Director of Medical Services to the Sudan Government. He resigned from that position in 1909 and became Director of the Civil Hospitals at Khartoum and Omdurman. Christopherson served with the Red Cross in Serbia during World War I and was taken prisoner of war by the Austrian army. With the help of Rudolf Carl von Slatin, who he knew from his time in Khartoum, Christopherson was able to secure his own release. He went to France and served there as secretary to the War Office Commission on Medical Establishments in the British Expeditionary Force in the ongoing World War I. After returning to the United Kingdom he worked in a bilharzia clinic of the Ministry of Pensions.

For his services during the war, he was invested as a member of the Order of the Nile and the Order of St. Sava. In 1919, for his work in the Sudan, he was appointed a Commander of the Order of the British Empire. Christopherson published his most influential discovery in 1918. He discovered that antimony potassium tartrate was an effective drug in the treatment of bilharzia. Although it had severe side effects, this treatment, which involved the use of antimony derivates, was the state of the art until the 1950s. The next generation of drugs also contained antimony and were in use until the 1970s.

He was President of the tropical diseases section of the Royal Society of Medicine in 1929–1930 and a member of the Société de pathologie exotique.

== Personal life ==
Christopherson married Joyce Ormerod in 1912. She was a daughter of J. A. Ormerod, FRCP.
