= George Ormerod =

English historian and antiquarian (1785–1873)

George Ormerod JP DL FRS FSA
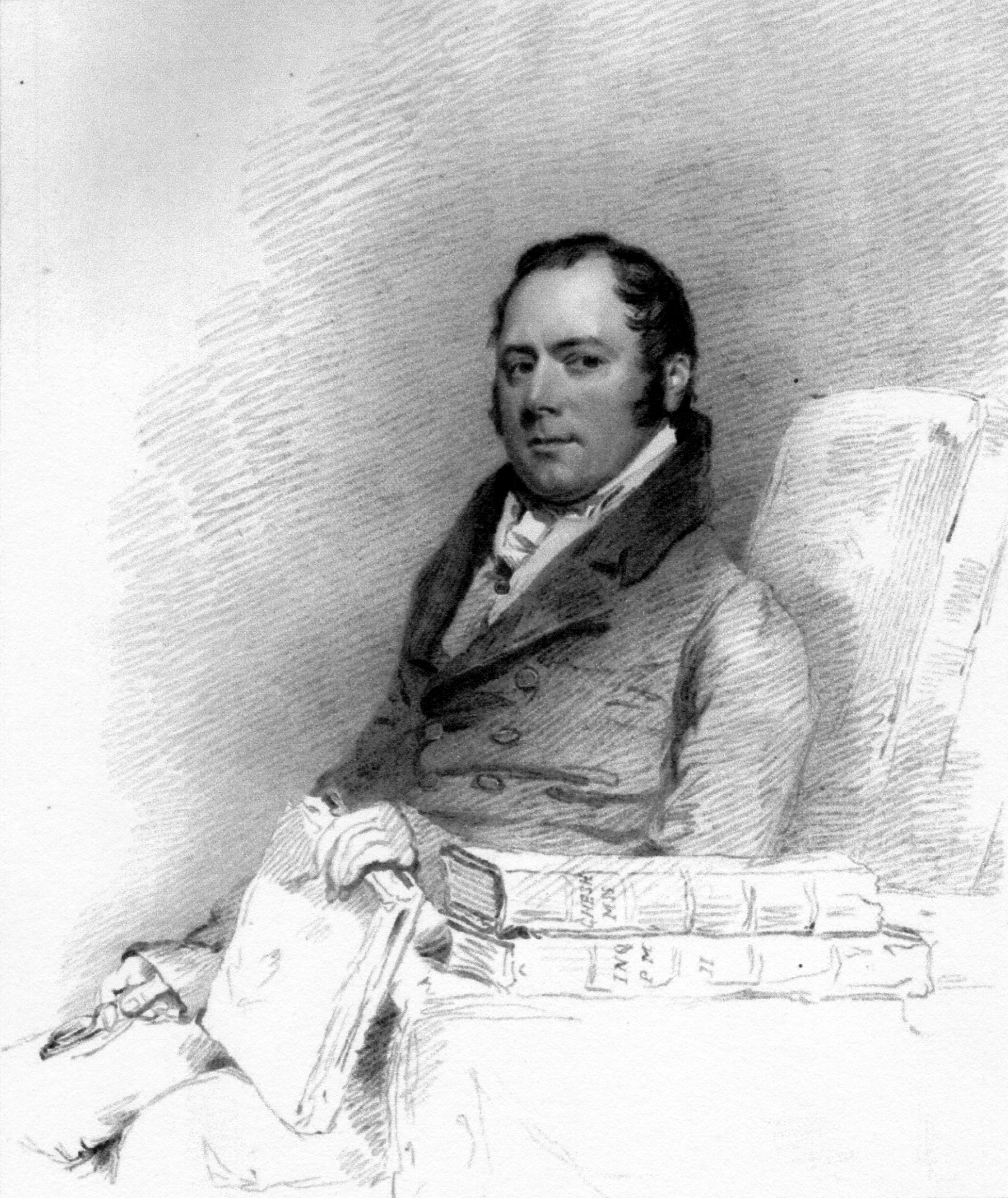
- George Ormerod
- Born: 20 October 1785; Manchester, Lancashire, England
- Died: 9 October 1873 (age 87); Sedbury, Gloucestershire, England
- Education: King's School, Chester; Brasenose College, Oxford
- Occupation: Historian
- Spouse: Sarah Latham
- Children: William Piers Ormerod (anatomist); Eleanor Anne Ormerod (entomologist)

George Ormerod (20 October 1785 – 9 October 1873) was an English antiquary and historian. Among his writings was a major county history of Cheshire, in North West England.

== Biography ==
Ormerod was born in Manchester and educated first privately, then briefly at the King's School, Chester, before continuing his education privately again under Rev Thomas Bancroft, vicar of Bolton. He matriculated at Brasenose College, Oxford, in 1803, graduated BA in 1806, and received the honorary degree of MA in 1807. In 1806, when he came of age, he inherited extensive estates in Tyldesley and south Lancashire. In 1808, he married Sarah Latham, the daughter of John Latham (1761–1843), a doctor living in Bradwall Hall, Sandbach. Following their marriage, they first lived in Rawtenstall but moved to Great Missenden the following year. In 1810 he was the tenant at Damhouse in Astley.

By this time, Ormerod had become involved with research into the history of Cheshire, and to make this task easier, he bought Chorlton House and estate, which was four miles from Chester. He lived in this house from 1811 to 1823. When this historical work was completed he moved to Gloucestershire, buying the Barnesville estate at Sedbury which he renamed Sedbury Park. He lived there from 1828 until his death. While there, he was appointed as a Justice of the Peace and he served as Deputy Lieutenant for Gloucestershire in 1861. He died at Sedbury Park and was buried nearby at Tidenham.

== History of Cheshire ==
The full title of Ormerod's work is The History of the County Palatine and City of Chester... incorporated with a republication of King's Vale Royal and Leycester's Cheshire antiquities (see Bibliography). An extremely rare initial print in two volumes with duplicated plates was followed by a general subscription in ten parts, which formed three volumes, between 1816 and 1819. Much of his research was from documents held in Chester Castle and from books and documents lent to him by Hugh Cholmondeley, Dean of Chester. He also borrowed material from some of the leading county families. Much of the transcription of these records was performed by Rev. J. Eaton, his research assistant, and by Faithful Thomas, the deputy keeper of the records at Chester Castle. Ormerod made tours of the county and claimed to have visited each township at least once.

Like other county histories of the period, the work consists mainly of family history, manorial history and antiquarian topography. Ormerod deliberately excluded reference to commerce, industry and urbanisation. Between a quarter and a third of the work was written by Ormerod himself while the rest consists of transcripts of documents and reprints of earlier works. A second edition of the work, revised and enlarged, was produced by Thomas Helsby and published between 1875 and 1882.

Ormerod was elected a Fellow of the Royal Society in 1819.

== Career and works ==
In 1816 Ormerod was responsible for organising the restoration of the Saxon crosses in Sandbach. He later became a founder member of the Historic Society of Lancashire and Cheshire in 1848 and of the Chester Archaeological Society in 1849. He was also a founder member of the Chetham Society and served as a member of its Council from its foundation in 1843 until 1848. For this society he edited Lancashire Civil War Tracts in 1844 and some other works. Following his move to Gloucestershire he became interested in the antiquities and Roman history of the local area, publishing a series of books and papers, including Strigulensia in 1861, which was about the archaeology of the local region around Chepstow Castle, which in the Middle Ages had been known as "Striguil".

== Family ==
On 2 August 1808, Ormerod married Sarah Latham, the eldest daughter of the physician, John Latham. They had seven sons and three daughters:

- Thomas Johnson Ormerod (1809–74), religious minister, married Maria Susan Bailey, daughter of Joseph Bailey.
- George Wareing Ormerod (1810–91), solicitor and geologist.
- John Arderne Ormerod (1813–64), religious minister, died unmarried.
- Susan Mary Ormerod (1814–96), died unmarried in Exeter.
- Henry Mere Ormerod (1816–98), solicitor.
- William Piers Ormerod (1818–60), anatomist and surgeon.
- Edward Latham Ormerod (1819–73), physician, married Mary Olivia Porter in 1853 and Maria Millet in 1856.
- Arthur Stanley Ormerod (1821–84), religious minister.
- Georgiana Elizabeth Ormerod (1822–96), entomologist and scientific illustrator.
- Eleanor Anne Ormerod (1828–1901), entomologist, died unmarried.

== See also ==
- Sandbach Crosses

== Bibliography ==
- The History of the County Palatine and City of Chester (1819): Volume 1, Volume 2, Volume 3.
