= George Milner Ormerod =

British army officer (1879–1936)

- Born: 1879; Marylebone, London, England
- Died: 18 May 1936 (aged 56–57); Lewes, Sussex, England
- Occupations: Army Officer and Senior Policeman
- Known for: Chief Constable of East Sussex

Lieutenant Colonel George Milner Ormerod, DSO (1879 – 18 May 1936) was a British army officer who worked for military intelligence and later served as Chief Constable of East Sussex.

== Early life ==
Ormerod was born in Marylebone, London, the son of physician Joseph Arderne Ormerod and Mary Ellen nee Milner. He was educated at Rugby and The Queen's College, Oxford

== Army and Police ==
Ormerod was commissioned into the British Army as a second lieutenant in the Royal Field Artillery on 28 March 1900, and had his first posting with the 119 Battery stationed at Exeter. In 1912 Ormerod was appointed Assistant Chief Constable of Lancashire, but at the outbreak of the First World War he returned to serve in the army. He was seconded to military intelligence. In 1920 he was appointed Chief Constable of East Sussex.

== Family life ==
Ormerod married Mildred Grace in 1909. Ormerod died on 18 May 1936 in Lewes, Sussex aged 56. At his funeral in Lewes on 22 May 1936 two hundred members of the Police force were present.

== Honours and awards ==
Ormerod was mentioned in despatches twice, and was awarded the Distinguished Service Order.
