= Eleanor Anne Ormerod =

English entomologist

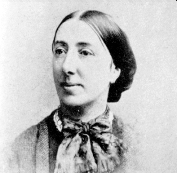
- Born: 11 May 1828; Sedbury Park, Gloucestershire, England
- Died: 19 July 1901 (aged 73); St Albans, Hertfordshire, England
- Parents: George Ormerod (father); Sarah Ormerod (née Latham) (mother)
- Relatives: Edward Latham Ormerod, William Piers Ormerod (brothers)
- Scientific career
- Fields: entomology, agriculture
- Workplaces: Royal Agricultural College

Eleanor Anne Ormerod (11 May 1828 – 19 July 1901) was a pioneer English entomologist. Based on her studies in agriculture, she became one of the first to define the field of agricultural entomology. She published an influential series of articles on useful insects and pests in the Gardeners' Chronicle and the Agricultural Gazette along with annual reports from 1877 to 1900. These annual reports were produced by summarizing information provided by her network of correspondents from across Britain. Belonging to the landed gentry, she worked as an honorary consulting entomologist with the Royal Agricultural Society of England and received no pay for any of her work. She also promoted the use of paris green as an insecticide and called for the extermination of the house sparrow.

== Life ==
Eleanor was a daughter of Sarah and George Ormerod, FRS, author of The History of Cheshire, and was born at Sedbury Park, Gloucestershire. From early childhood insects were her interest and she had great opportunities to study them in the large estate where she grew up. While her brothers went to Rugby School, studying under Thomas Arnold, she was tutored at home by her mother. She took an interest in insects which became more serious on 12 March 1852 when a rare insect led her to Stephen's Manual of British beetles. She acquired a Pillischer microscope around 1863 and began to make more keen observations. She studied agriculture in general and became a local authority on it. When, in 1868, the Royal Horticultural Society began forming a collection of insect pests of the farm for practical purposes, Ormerod contributed greatly to it, and was awarded the Flora medal of the Society.

In 1877 she published a pamphlet, Notes for Observations on Injurious Insects, which was a questionnaire distributed to interested persons, who in turn sent in the results of their researches, resulting in a series of Annual Series of Reports on Injurious Insects and Farm Pests. She was elected to the Entomological Society of London in 1878. In 1881, Ormerod published a special report on the turnip-fly, and in 1882 was appointed consulting entomologist to the Royal Agricultural Society, a post she held until 1892. For several years she was lecturer on scientific entomology at the Royal Agricultural College, Cirencester.

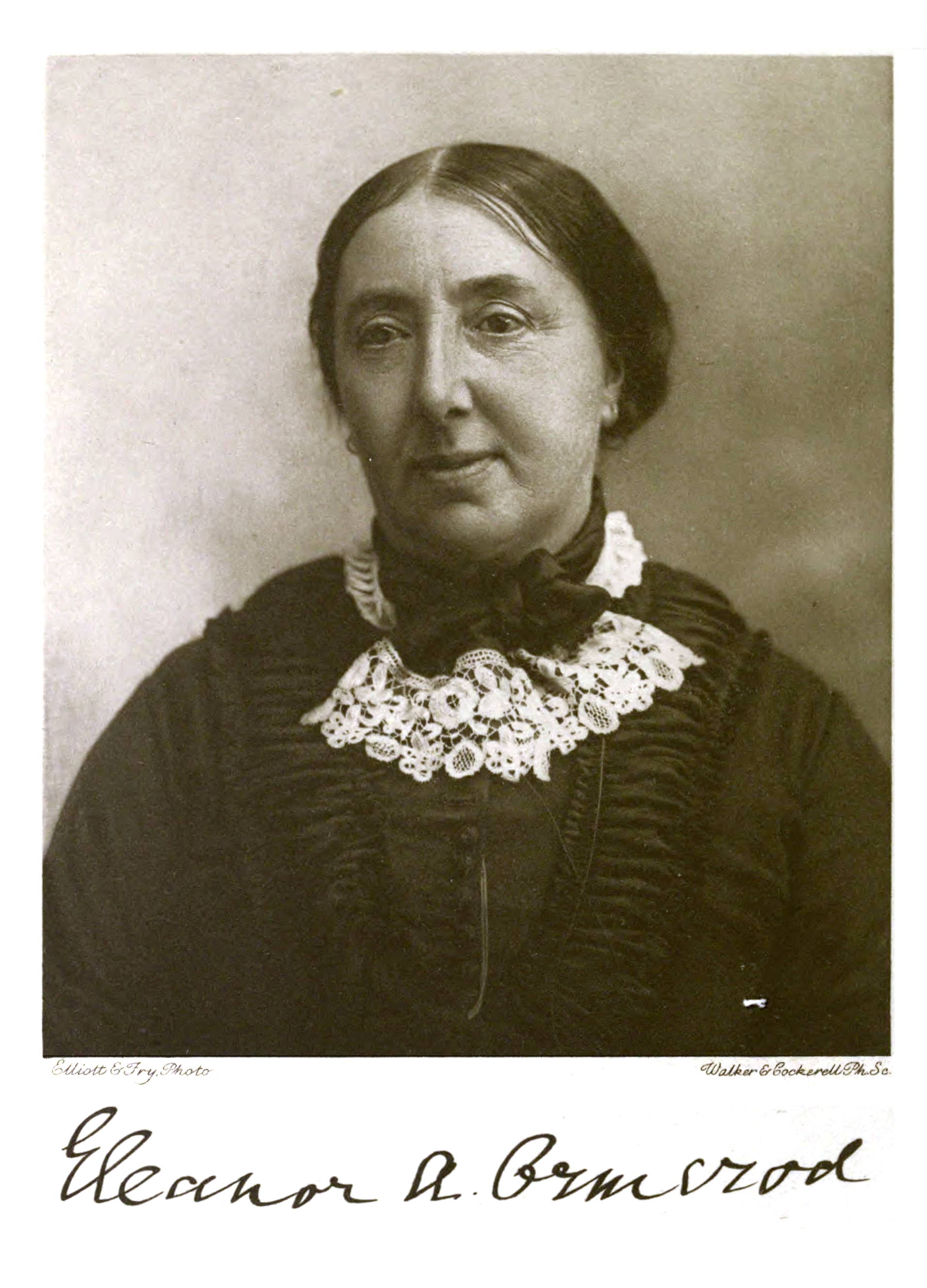
In later life

Her fame was not confined to England; she received silver and gold medals from the University of Moscow for her models of insects injurious to plants, and her treatise on The Injurious Insects of South Africa showed how wide was her range. In 1899, she received a silver medal from the Société nationale d'acclimatation de France.

Her works on natural history were widely cited and she undertook brave experiments:

Miss Ormerod, to personally test the effect, pressed part of the back and tail of a live Crested Newt between the teeth. "The first effect was a bitter astringent feeling in the mouth, with irritation of the upper part of the throat, numbing of the teeth more immediately holding the animal, and in about a minute from the first touch of the newt a strong flow of saliva. This was accompanied by much foam and violent spasmodic action, approaching convulsions, but entirely confined to the mouth itself. The experiment was immediately followed by headache lasting for some hours, general discomfort of the system, and half an hour after by slight shivering fits."

— Gadow, 1909

Among other works are the Cobden Journals, Manual of Injurious Insects, and Handbook of Insects injurious to Orchard and Bush Fruits. Almost the last honour which fell to her was the honorary degree of LLD of the University of Edinburgh in March 1900—a unique distinction, for she was the first woman upon whom the university had conferred this degree. The Dean of the law faculty summarised Ormerod's contributions:

The pre-eminent position which Miss Ormerod holds in the world of science is the reward of patient study and unwearying observation. Her investigations have been chiefly directed towards the discovery of methods for the prevention of the ravages of those insects which are injurious to orchard, field and forest. Her labours have been crowned with such success that she is entitled to be hailed the protectress of agriculture and the fruits of the earth—a beneficent Demeter of the 19th century.

Ormerod was the first woman to be honored with a Fellowship in the Meteorological Society (1878). Her interest in meteorology was possibly inspired by her brother George Wareing Ormerod who was involved in setting up a meteorological observatory at Teignmouth. He became a Fellow in 1874. Eleanor collated and published a private weather journal from a Miss Caroline Molesworth of Cobham, Surrey in 1880 as The Cobham Journals. It consisted of more than 75,000 made from 1825 to 1850 including notes on weather and plant life.

Along with W.B. Tegetmeier, she called for the extermination of the house sparrow in 1897. She was opposed, most vocally by Edith Carrington, who was also involved in protectionist and anti-vivisectionist movements. Carrington argued that nature was complex and that any actions would have repercussions, stating that 'it is impossible to do one thing only.' A reverend J.E. Walker wrote requesting her not to 'steel' her 'compassionate, womanly heart' with her scientific studies but rather fulfil her duty as a woman through philanthropic works.

She was a strong advocate for introducing Paris Green to Britain from North America. It is an arsenic-derived compound and broad spectrum insecticide that kills most insects, including pollinators and predators, which then gives free rein to pests, creating a vicious cycle of dependence on chemical insecticides. It was later identified as a dangerous product.

On the death of her father she and her sisters moved to Torquay where their uncle Dr Mere Latham lived but relocated after three years to Spring Grove, Isleworth to be near to Kew Gardens where she had close friends in Sir Joseph and Lady Hooker, the garden's director. In 1887 she moved to Torrington House, 47 Holywell Hill, St Albans, Hertfordshire with her sister Georgiana Elizabeth Ormerod. She died there on 19 July 1901 following a kidney illness. The building bears a plaque in her honour. She was buried in the same grave as her sister Georgiana (who was a scientific illustrator), at Hatfield Road Cemetery in St Albans.

== Partial list of publications ==
- Report of observations of attack of turnip fly in 1881 (1882)
- Manual of injurious insects with methods of prevention and remedy for their attacks to food crops, forest trees and fruit: to which is appended a short introduction to entomology (1890)
- Paris-green (or Emerald-green): its uses, and methods for its application, as a means of destruction of orchard moth caterpillars (1891)
- Handbook of insects injurious to orchards and bush fruits with means of prevention and remedy (1898)
- Flies injurious to stock: being life-histories and means of prevention of a few kinds commonly injurious, with special observations on ox warble or bot fly (1900)
- Her autobiography Eleanor Ormerod, Ll. D., economic entomologist: autobiography and correspondence (1904) digitised and available online.

== Recognition ==
Virginia Woolf wrote an essay about her entitled Miss Ormerod in 1924. Ormerod's portrait hangs at the foot of the main south-east stair in Old College, University of Edinburgh, proudly proclaiming her as Edinburgh's first woman honorary graduate. In 2017, the University of Edinburgh named their research cloud computing service 'Eleanor' after her.

Ormerod's name was also commemorated, along with a series of other biologists, in the name of the RepRap Ormerod 3D printer.

== See also ==
- Timeline of women in science
