= Sedbury =

Village in Gloucestershire, England

Coordinates: 51.634862°N 2.655337°W

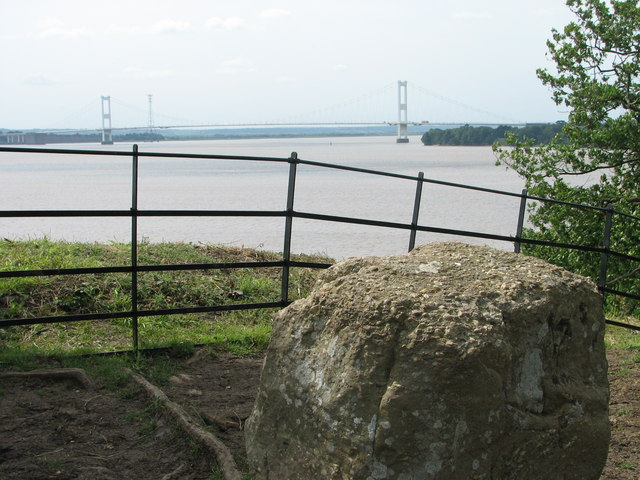
- The stone marking the southern end of the Offa's Dyke Path at Sedbury, with the Severn Bridge in the background

- Location within Gloucestershire
- Population: 3,535
- OS grid reference: ST546931
- District: Forest of Dean
- Shire county: Gloucestershire
- Region: South West
- Country: England
- Sovereign state: United Kingdom
- Post town: CHEPSTOW
- Postcode district: NP16
- Dialling code: 01291
- Police: Gloucestershire
- Fire: Gloucestershire
- Ambulance: South Western

Sedbury is a village in the Forest of Dean district of west Gloucestershire, England. It is located on the eastern bank of the River Wye, facing the town of Chepstow in Monmouthshire. The village is in the parish of Tidenham. It had a population of 3,535. Nearby are the villages of Tutshill, Woodcroft and Beachley.

== History ==
Sedbury is located on the eastern (English) side of the southern end of Offa's Dyke, a defensive ditch and dyke built in the late 8th century by Anglo Saxon King Offa of Mercia to mark the border with Wales. After the Norman Conquest, the manor of Tidenham, which included Sedbury, fell within the lordship of Striguil, or Chepstow. It was transferred to Gloucestershire following the abolition of the Marcher lordships through the Laws in Wales Acts 1535-1542.

Until the early 19th century, Sedbury was usually known as Sudbury, a name derived from "south fortification", referring either to Offa's Dyke or a Roman settlement in Sedbury Park. The development of the village began during the First World War, when a prisoner of war camp of concrete huts was built north of the main road at what is now Grahamstown Road. Later, huts were built for Royal Engineers working to establish the National Shipyard at Beachley, and houses were constructed at Pennsylvania Farm (now Mercian Way). Development in the mid-20th century included more housing, shops, a pub and schools close to the main road. Further development was proposed in 2013.

Until the opening of the Severn Bridge nearby in 1966, ferries crossed the Severn Estuary between the villages of Beachley and Aust.

=== Sedbury Park ===
Sedbury House is a Grade II* listed Georgian building designed by Sir Robert Smirke, the architect of the British Museum. The surrounding estate was established, as Barnesville, around 1800 by Sir Henry Cosby. In 1825 it was bought by the historian and antiquary George Ormerod, who renamed it Sedbury Park, and commissioned Smirke to add classical colonnades and a portico to the existing house. Ormerod's youngest daughter, Eleanor Anne Ormerod, was born there in 1828, later becoming a renowned entomologist.

The estates were bought by the businessman and politician Samuel Marling in 1875, and his son Sir William Henry Marling made major alterations to the house around 1898. The estate included 25 farms in Tidenham, Hewelsfield and Woolaston. The house was the home of Colonel Sir Percival Marling, V.C., before he sold it in 1921. It then became a hotel, and an approved school in 1942, before being converted to a residential nursing home. In the 1930s many of the fittings and furnishings were removed from Sedbury House to the Tennessee home of Leslie Cheek, heir to the Maxwell House coffee empire. The stable block and carriage house have been converted into residential properties.

== Amenities ==
Sedbury is the location of Wyedean School, one of the schools attended by author J. K. Rowling, and Offa's Mead Academy.

At the top of Sedbury Cliff overlooking the Severn Estuary is one end of the Offa's Dyke Path, a waymarked long-distance footpath and National Trail, stretching to Prestatyn in North Wales, close to the Wales-England border.

== Notable people ==
- Eleanor Anne Ormerod (1828–1901), entomologist
