= Edward Latham Ormerod =

English physician and amateur entomologist

Edward Latham Ormerod FRS, MD
- Born: 27 August 1819; London
- Died: 18 March 1873 (aged 53)
- Education: Rugby School, St Bartholomew's Hospital, London, Gonville and Caius College, Cambridge (MD 1851)
- Known for: British Social Wasps (1868)
- Spouse(s): Mary Olivia Porter, Maria Millet
- Parents: George Ormerod (father); Sarah Ormerod (née Latham) (mother)
- Relatives: William Piers Ormerod (brother), Eleanor Anne Ormerod (sister)
- Scientific career
- Fields: Medicine, natural history
- Institutions: St Bartholomew's Hospital, Sussex County Hospital

Edward Latham Ormerod (27 August 1819 – 18 March 1873) was an English physician and amateur entomologist.

He was born in London, the seventh of ten children of George Ormerod, the Cheshire historian and his wife Sarah Latham, eldest daughter of the physician, John Latham. His younger sister was Eleanor Anne Ormerod. He was educated at Rugby School until 1838, was a student at St Bartholomew's Hospital, London until October 1841, and then went up to Gonville and Caius College, Cambridge. There he was awarded a classical scholarship, and afterwards scholarships in anatomy and chemistry and graduated M.B. in 1846 and M.D. in 1851.

He returned to St Bartholomew's in 1846 to work in the post-mortem room as a demonstrator until health problems obliged him to move to Brighton in 1847 to practise as a physician. He was elected a fellow of the Royal College of Physicians and in 1851 delivered their Gulstonian Lectures on the subject of "Valvular disease of the heart". In 1853 he was appointed physician to the Sussex County Hospital.

During this time he published a number of papers on medicine and natural history. His publication of British Social Wasps in 1868 secured his election as a Fellow of the Royal Society on 6 June 1872.

He died in 1873 of disease of the bladder. He had married in 1853 Mary Olivia Porter, who died later the same year and in 1856 Maria Millett, with whom he had six children. One of his sons was the physician Sir Arthur Latham Ormerod, Oxford's first Medical Officer for Health.

== Works ==
- Clinical Observations on Continued Fever', 1848
- On Fatty degeneration of the Heart, 1849
- On non-rheumatic Pericarditis, 1853
- Degeneration of the Bones, in St Bartholomew's Hospital Reports, vols vi. and vii.
- Pathology of Fatty Degeneration, St Bartholomew's Hospital Reports, vol. iv, 1868
- The Natural History of British Social Wasps, 8vo 1868
