= Georgiana Ormerod =

British naturalist (1822–1896)

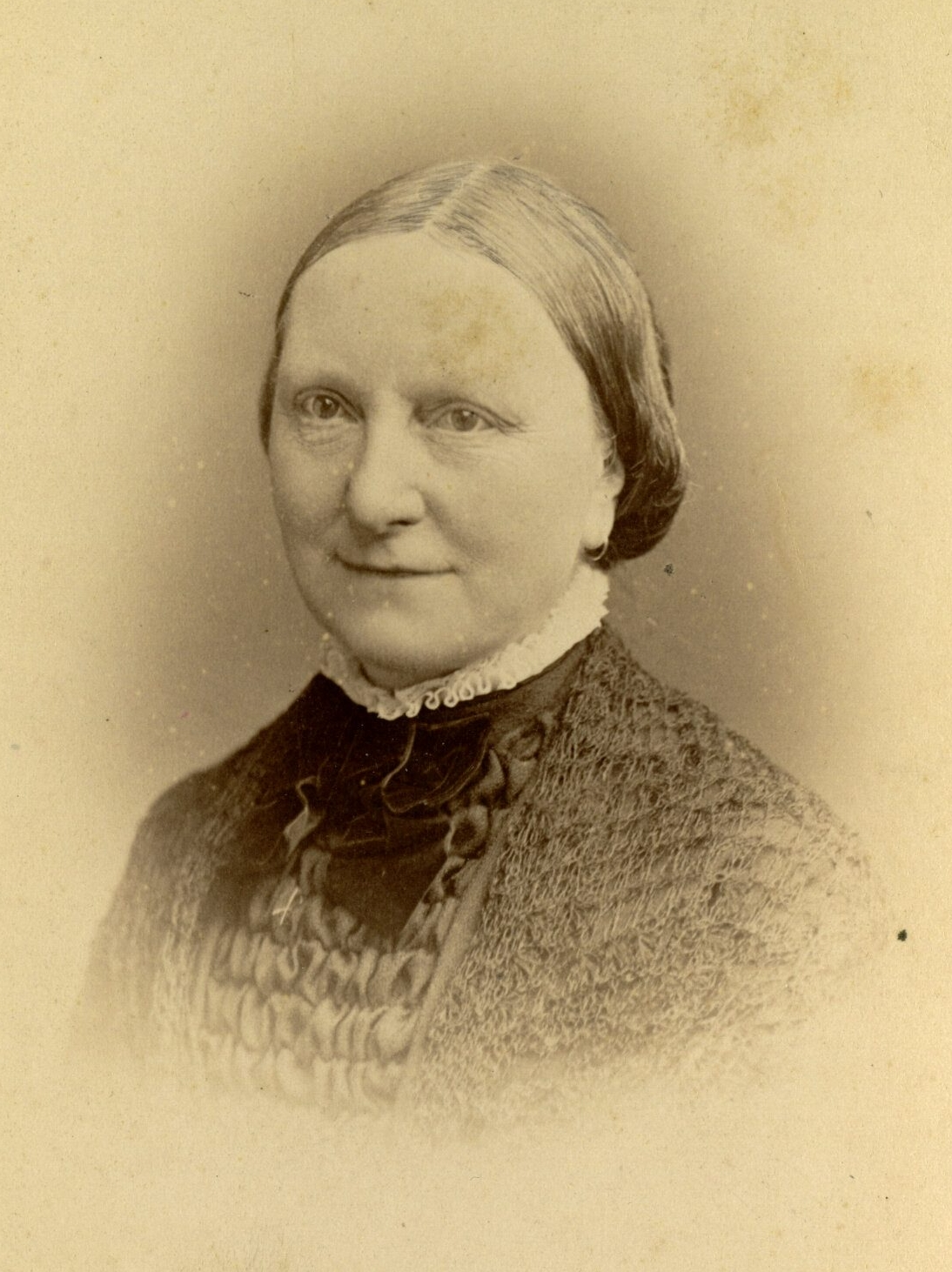
- Born: 23 December 1822; Marylebone
- Died: 19 August 1896 (aged 73)
- Relatives: Eleanor Ormerod (Sister)

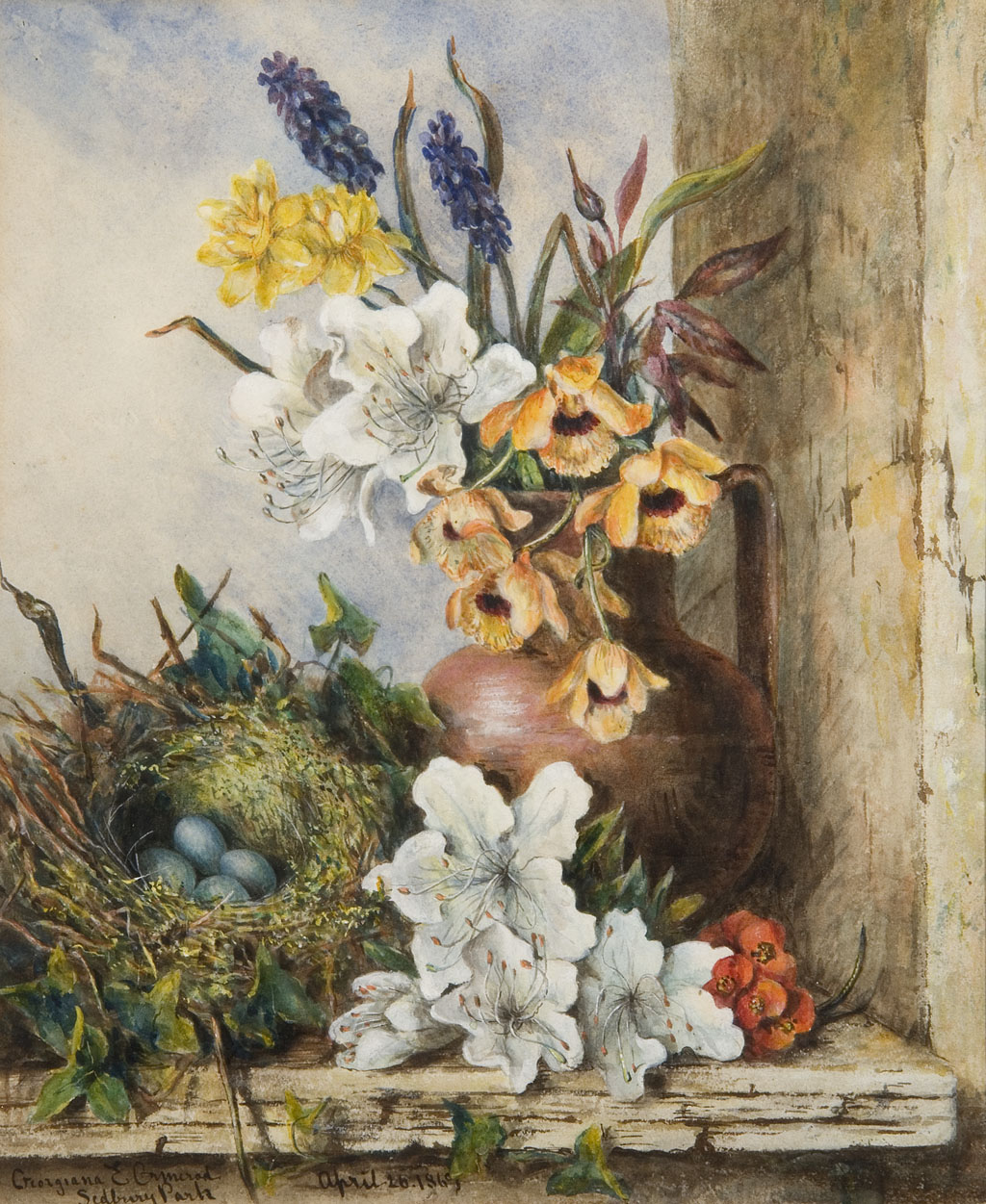
Still life, 1869

Georgiana Elizabeth Ormerod (23 December 1822 – 19 August 1896) was an English naturalist and artist. She was the older sister of the entomologist Eleanor Ormerod. She illustrated many of the works of Eleanor and took a special interest in collecting molluscs.

Ormerod was born in Marylebone, daughter of George (1785-1873) and Sarah (Latham) Ormerod (1784-1860). She was educated at home and took an interest in art, plants and molluscs. Her collection of shells grew to over 3000 species which she donated to Beaumont Park Natural History Museum, Huddersfield. Her knowledge of European languages helped her translate scientific publications in entomology for her sister. She also illustrated insects for the works of her sister. She was a member of the Royal Entomological Society from 1880. She also took an interest in history and literature. She lent books to other children in the locale while growing up. She got lessons in art along with her sisters Mary and Eleanor from Copley Fielding. When the family moved to Sedbury, Georgiana was in-charge of poultry keeping.
