= William Piers Ormerod =

English anatomist and surgeon

- Born: 14 May 1818; London
- Died: 10 June 1860 (aged 42); Canterbury
- Occupations: Anatomist and surgeon

William Piers Ormerod (14 May 1818 – 10 June 1860) was an English anatomist and surgeon.

== Biography ==
Ormerod was born in London 14 May 1818, was the fifth son of George Ormerod of Sedbury Park, Gloucestershire. He was sent to school first at Laleham under the Rev. John Buckland, together with his younger brother, Edward Latham and afterwards (1832) to Rugby, under Arnold, by whom three of his elder brothers had been educated. In 1835 he went to St. Bartholomew's Hospital, where, by the advice of his uncle, Dr. Latham, he was articled as a private pupil to Mr. Stanley, and where he had the advantage of the guiding friendship of Mr. James (afterwards Sir James) Paget. He was a quiet and diligent student, and highly distinguished himself in the school examinations in 1839. In 1840–1 he was house-surgeon to Mr. (afterwards Sir William) Lawrence, and in 1842 gained the Jacksonian prize of the Royal College of Surgeons for an ‘Essay on the Comparative Merits of Mercury and Iodine in the Treatment of Syphilis.’ In 1843 he was appointed demonstrator of anatomy, and in the following year he printed, for the use of the students of the hospital, a collection of ‘Questions in Practical Anatomy,’ 1844. He became a member of the London College of Surgeons in 1843, and afterwards a fellow; he belonged also to the Royal Medical and Chirurgical Society. But he had been working too hard, and his health began to fail, so that in 1844 he was obliged to leave London and retire for a time to his father's house at Sedbury Park. Here, as soon as his health recovered, he employed himself in arranging the surgical materials that he had collected in the hospital during the nine years 1835–44, and published them, together with the substance of his Jacksonian prize essay, in 1846, with the title, ‘Clinical Collections and Observations in Surgery, made during an Attendance on the Surgical Practice of St. Bartholomew's Hospital.’ The volume is put together with characteristic carefulness and accuracy.

In the summer of 1846 Ormerod resumed his professional work at Oxford. He was elected one of the surgeons to the Radcliffe Infirmary, and in 1848 published, under the auspices of the Ashmolean Society, an essay ‘On the Sanatory [sic] condition of Oxford,’ based on the annual reports of the registrar-general for 1844–6, and especially directing attention to the sanitary condition of the different localities in which the deaths from zymotic diseases had occurred. But in December 1848, ‘after a period of great hurry and anxiety,’ he suffered from epileptic fits, and retired from practice altogether. Ill-health was the cause of his ceasing to practise and leaving Oxford in 1849, and eventually (1850) he settled at Canterbury. He died there on 10 June 1860, having fractured the base of his skull from a fall during an epileptic seizure. He was buried in the churchyard of St. Martin's, Canterbury.
