= St Peter's Cave, Chepstow =

Cave in Chepstow, Wales

Coordinates: 51.6313°N 2.66759°W

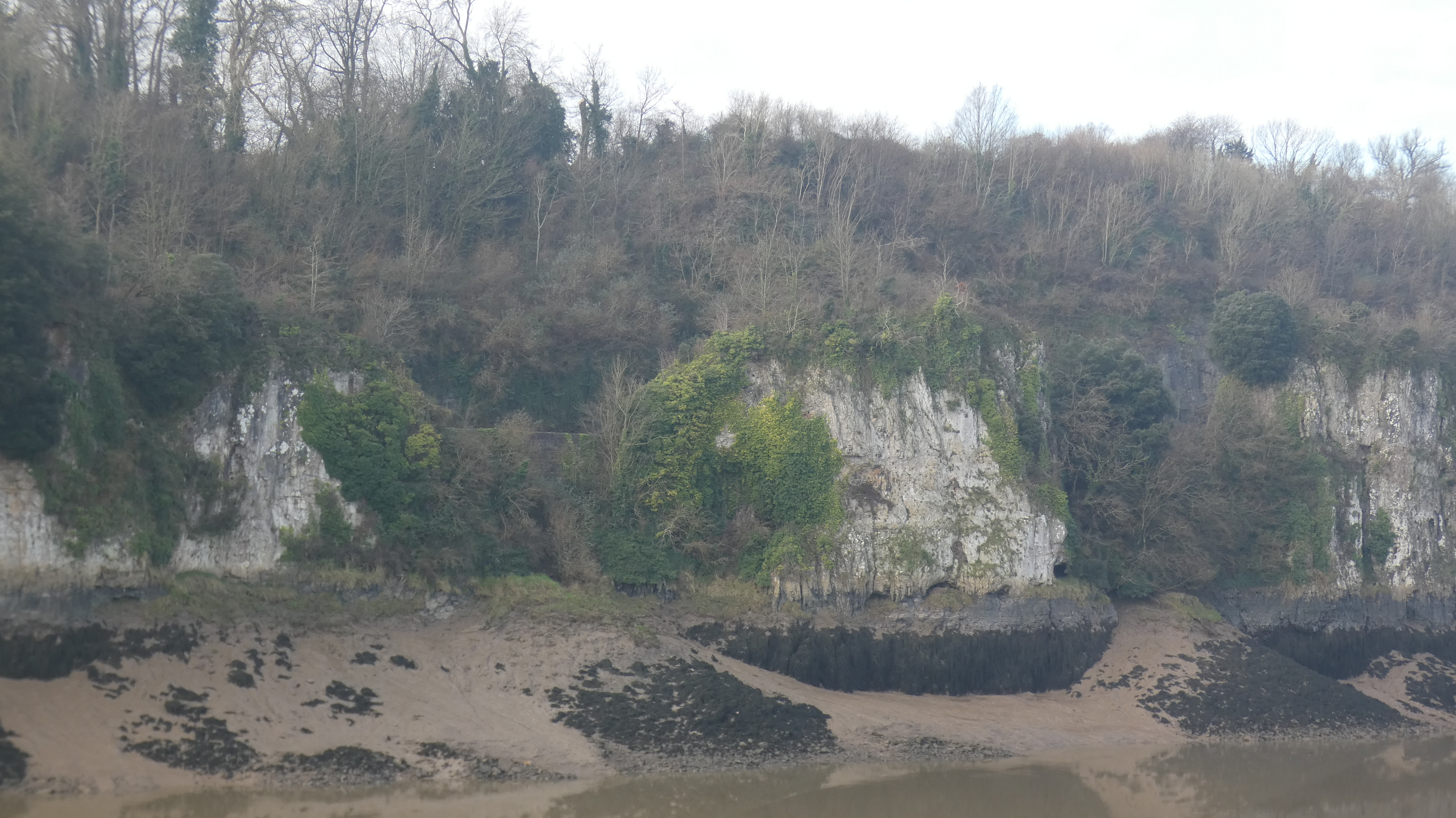
- Hardwick Cliff, below Bulwark in Chepstow - The entrance to St Peter's Cave is behind the vegetation on the left of the central limestone section, below the railway

- Location within Monmouthshire
- Community: Wye Valley
- Principal area: Monmouthshire
- Country: Wales
- Sovereign state: United Kingdom
- Post town: CHEPSTOW
- Postcode district: NP16
- Dialling code: 01291
- Police: Gwent
- Fire: South Wales
- Ambulance: Welsh
- UK Parliament: Monmouth
- Senedd Cymru – Welsh Parliament: Monmouth

St Peter's Cave is a natural opening in the base of the limestone of Hardwick Cliff, below Bulwarks Camp and above the mean high-water mark on the River Wye in Chepstow. It is potentially the site of the earliest discovered evidence of human occupation in this part of the lower Wye Valley. It is a scheduled monument.

== Nomenclature ==
It is unclear where the modern name came from; in the late 19th century, it was referred to in local newspapers as "Salt Peter's Hole" so it was possibly misheard later, but even in the 19th century the provenance of 'Salt Peter' - with the obvious suggestion of the gunpowder ingredient - was queried. Another cave, said to be high up a cliff by Chepstow Castle, was referred to as St Peter's Cave in 1981.

== Geology ==
The cave at its last-reported length is within Llanelly Formation limestone, dolomitised and close to Gully Oolite Formation limestone (crease limestone) and Black Rock Limestone a few tens of metres north of the cave, and Hunts Bay Oolite on the opposite bank of the Wye. The rock was formed between 344.5 and 343 million years ago during the Carboniferous period. In the area, and in the rocks to the south and east of the cave, the limestone is overlain with Mercia Mudstone marginal facies, conglomerate and sedimentary rock formed between 252.2 and 201.3 million years ago during the Triassic period.

== History ==
Evidence was found in the cave of human activity, possibly from the Upper Paleolithic, in the 1960s form of charcoal deposits which with dating confirmation would be earliest known evidence of human habitation in the Chepstow Transport Corridor area of the lower Wye valley.

Blasting took place on Hardwick Cliff in the 1840s to make a cutting for the railway to Newport. This work loosened large amounts of material, causing landslips and injuries, and cutting through what might have been a connecting chamber to the cave which has since been choked with argillaceous material. The railway runs directly over the cave.

In 1892, a visiting newspaper journalist was taken to the cave - then described as "Salt Peter's Hole" - with two guides by boat and reported that he passed between 50 and 70 yards (46 to 64 metres) inside from the entrance before stopping because advancing any further would have meant crawling, which they did not wish to do. The journalist had heard from others that, not long before, it was possible to go 200 to 300 yards (183 to 274 metres) - one of his guides actually claimed they'd just walked 300 yards - the local tale following that it used to go as far as Chepstow Castle (approximately 1500 metres to the north), which was dismissed as fanciful. It was noted that the cave was evidently made by water and was being gradually silted up by it.

On 14 January 1895, 59-year-old John Childs, a journeyman baker who had been missing for two days, was found dead by a passing boatman on the mud, two yards from the water's edge near the cave entrance which was similarly described in another local newspaper as "Salt Peter's Hole". The article reported Childs was presumed drowned. The coroner, E.P. King, held an inquest at the Three Tuns Inn in Chepstow; the verdict was simply "found dead on the banks of the River Wye".

In 1950, Reverend Cecil Cullingford, head teacher of Monmouth School for Boys who had a keen interest in archaeology and authored noted books on British speleology over subsequent decades, explored the cave with his students. He considered it a possible archaeological site. It was made a scheduled monument 15 years later when (undated) charcoal deposits were found. John Elliott, part of the team that explored the depths of the Otter Hole when it was discovered in 1970 also explored it, mentioning its difficult access, traversing through stinging nettles and relying on roots as holds to reach it.

In August 1988, Keith Jones of the Isca Caving Club measured the distance from the southeast-facing entrance to its terminating internal mud choke as the floor began to ascend at 28 metres. He found boulders at 9 metres in and a pit at about 22 metres, somewhere under the railway. He described the walls as being covered in algae and most of the chamber filled with mud which was now the floor; he suggested that the mud-choked chamber on the western side of the railway above - directly in line with the cave - might have been connected to it before the blasting for the railway cutting commenced, also speculating that a good-sized cave system exists under Bulwark, possibly buried by a glacial plug.

The report by Cadw states that the length of the chamber is 21 metres, which would suggest it has more than halved in accessible length if the 1892 lower estimate of 46 metres (before crawling was necessary) is correct. The last archived reference, including photographs, was by archaeologist Felicity Taylor in 2004, with a similar description to Keith Jones.

== Natural history ==
The cave is within a Special Area of Conservation covering Wye Valley and Forest of Dean bat sites and Wye Valley Woodlands, the latter indicative in a buffer zone in the area of the cave and along Hardwick Cliff to encourage the planting of woodlands.
