= Adam Alexander =

Adam Alexander may refer to:

- Adam Alexander (sportscaster) (born 1973), American sportscaster
- Adam Rankin Alexander (1781–1848), US Congressman from Tennessee
- Adam Alexander Armstrong (1909–1982), Australian politician
- Adam Alexander Dawson (1913–2010), Scottish film director
- Demo Taped (born 1998) singer-songwriter from Atlanta, Georgia
- Adam Alexander (The Bold and the Beautiful), a character from the American soap opera
- Adam Alexander (horticulturalist), British horticulturalist

== See also ==
- Alexander Adam (1741–1809), Scottish educator and author
