= Chepstow Museum =

Museum in Monmouthshire, Wales

- Amgueddfa Cas-gwent
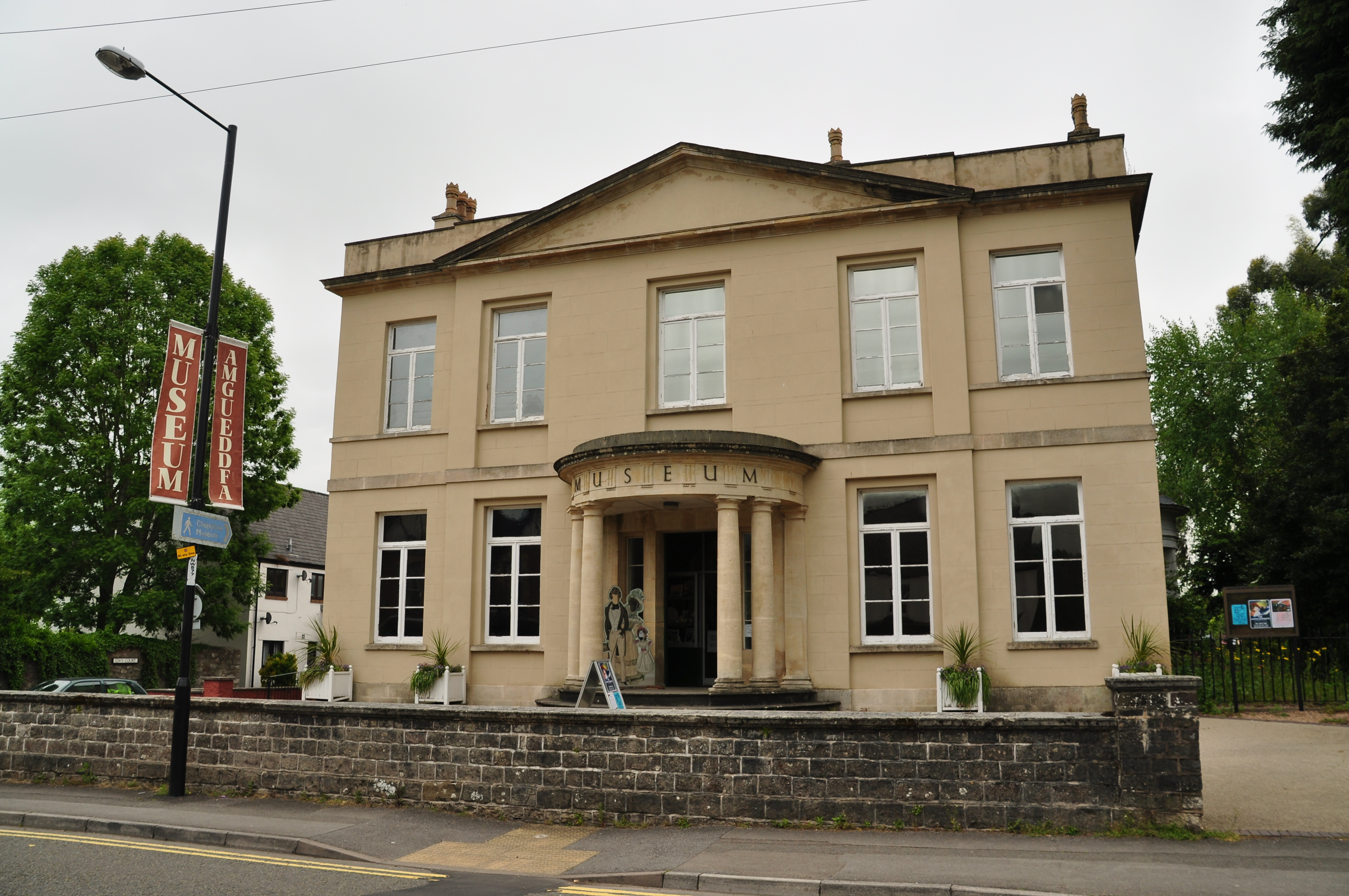

- Location within Monmouthshire
- Location: Bridge Street, Chepstow, Wales
- Coordinates: 51.644832°N 2.672415°W
- Owner: Monmouthshire Museums Service
- Website: Chepstow Museum

Chepstow Museum is a museum in Chepstow, Monmouthshire, south east Wales. It is operated by Monmouthshire Museums Service.

== Location ==
Chepstow Museum is located close to the town centre, opposite Chepstow Castle in Bridge Street, near the River Wye. It occupies Gwy House, a fine townhouse built in 1796 originally for Warren Jane, a wealthy apothecary and merchant. The building became a girls' high school in 1907, and was then used as a Red Cross hospital in World War I. In 1921 it became the Chepstow District Hospital, before being converted into the town museum in 1982. It retains many of its original internal features.

== Displays ==
The museum collection and displays reflect the growth and history of Chepstow as a trading port from medieval times and Marches town and its location within the Wye Valley, attracting many poets and painters.

In 2010 the museum held an exhibition, 'The Wye Tour and its Artists', of period art from the Wye Tour. A catalogue and detailed guide was published.
