= Powis Almshouses =

Coordinates: 51°38′35″N 2°40′28″W

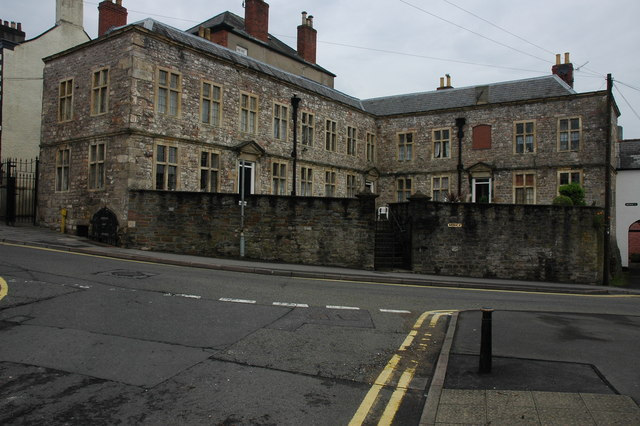
The Powis Almshouses, Chepstow

The Powis Almshouses are a block of almshouses in Chepstow, Monmouthshire, Wales, at the junction of Church Street and Bridge Street (formerly St Anne's Street). The building dates from about 1721, and was constructed as a result of a bequest from Thomas Powis, a vintner who was probably born in the town. The almshouse is a Grade II* listed building.

== History ==
Thomas Powis was probably born in Chepstow in or about 1675, the son of Grevill Powis who may have been attached to the garrison at Chepstow Castle. Nothing is known of Thomas Powis' later life other than that, in 1716, he was a vintner in Enfield, Middlesex, and in his will gave £1,800 to establish an almshouse in Chepstow for twelve poor men and women. He died in 1716, but because of legal ambiguities over the interpretation of the will it was not settled until 1718. The land for building the almshouses was acquired by its trustees in 1721 from the Duke of Montagu, and included the remains of a mediaeval hospital and cellar. The almshouses were built soon after then; although a plaque above the door gives a date of 1716, this refers to the date of the endowment rather than their completion. Initially they were known as the "New Almshouse", to distinguish the building from the "Old Almshouse" a few yards away on Church Street, now known as the Montague Almshouses.

The number of inmates was set at twelve, originally with an equal number of men and women, although vacancies did not have to be filled until the number of inmates became less than eight. This provision was modified in 1923, to allow for married couples to be included as residents. Applicants for accommodation were required to have been resident in Chepstow for three years, to be of good character, and to be able to support themselves financially. Residents were expected to keep their rooms "clean and in neat order", and to behave responsibly. Several residents were removed from their rooms for misdemeanours including drunkenness, riotous and improper behaviour, and in one case in 1847 for "admitting an improper woman into his room."

There were originally also twelve Trustees, reduced to eleven in 1878 with a stipulation that they should live within three miles of Chepstow. By 1923, considerable additional resources had been secured to run the Almshouse through the sale of farms that had been bought by the trustees from Thomas Lewis of St Pierre in 1727 as an investment. The properties were located in the parishes of Usk, Gwernesney and Llandenny.

Thomas Powis' bequest also provided for a sermon to be given each year on 10 November, in St Mary's Priory Church. In 1916 the vicar gave the sermon without having first received approval from the Trustees, who refused to pay him; the Trustees sought advice from the Charity Commission who insisted that the fee had to be paid.

== The building ==
The building is described by architectural historian John Newman as "a delightfully artless and unspoilt ensemble... built of roughly squared local limestone." It forms an L shape, with one arm of eight bays and the other of five bays. Three doorways give access to the accommodation. Information about the bequest is set out on a plaque positioned above the doorway in the shorter range, beneath a sundial. The mediaeval cellar was incorporated into the building and continued to be used as a wine cellar by local vintners until, during the Second World War, it was converted into an air raid shelter. The building has been renovated several times over the centuries, but with little change to its external appearance. The railings that originally enclosed the raised courtyard in front of the building were replaced by a stone wall in 1830.

The Almshouses were given Grade II* listed building status on 24 March 1975.
