= Hunts Bay Oolite =

- Stratigraphic range: Holkerian
- Type: Formation
- Unit of: Pembroke Limestone Group, Carboniferous Limestone Supergroup
- Underlies: Oxwich Head Limestone Formation
- Overlies: High Tor Limestone Formation

Lithology
- Primary: limestone
- Other: Oolite

Location
- Region: Wales
- Country: United Kingdom

Type section
- Named for: Hunts Bay, Gower Peninsula

Hunts Bay Oolite is an oolitic Carboniferous limestone geological formation found in the south Wales region. It is named after Hunts Bay on the Gower peninsula, south-south west of Bishopston, where a significant amount of the limestone forms the cliffs there.

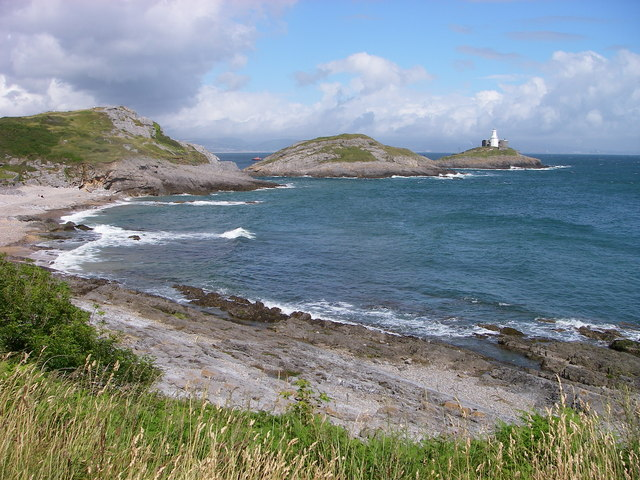
Bracelet Bay, eastern Gower, showing beds of Hunts Bay oolite dipping northwards and eastwards.

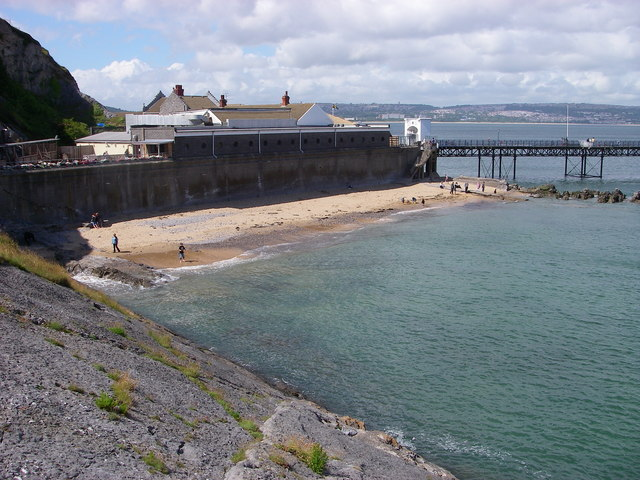
Steeply dipping beds of Hunts Bay oolite by Mumbles pier, eastern Gower.

Hunts Bay Oolite is a sub-group of the Pembroke Limestone Group which itself is part of the Carboniferous Limestone Supergroup.

Oolite means 'egg stone': very small grains (up to 2mm) form by accumulating precipitated minerals, usually calcium carbonate. These ooids, created in a warm, tropical environment, are the precursors to the limestone.

The Hunts Bay Oolite extends from Pembroke in the West to Monmouth and Chepstow in the East and northwards into the Dowlais Limestone Formation around Merthyr Tydfil. Fossils, such as brachiopods and crinoids associated with a shallow sea environment, can be found in the rock. East of the South Wales Coalfield and in the south east the rock is increasingly dolomitised (where some calcium is replaced by magnesium).

This subgroup was deposited in equatorial seas largely during the Holkerian (British regional) substage of the Viséan stage of the Carboniferous, from 337 to 333.5 million years ago.

== See also ==
- List of fossiliferous stratigraphic units in Wales
