= St Kynemark Priory =

Monastery in Chepstow, Wales

St. Kynemark Priory was part of a medieval Augustinian monastic range located in Chepstow, Wales founded sometime before 1270, likely after the Norman Conquest. It sits about one mile northwest of central Chepstow. It traces its origins to a Welsh saint named Cynfarch, or Cynmarch or Kynemark. His feast day is 8 September.

== History ==
It was previously the site of the Church of St. Cynmarch, mentioned in the Book of Llandaff, and given by Arthrwys, a Gwent royal in the 7th century.

It is mentioned in the Taxatio Ecclesiastica of 1291. It existed until 1534 when King Henry VIII dissolved it.

The remains of the house consist of walls enclosing a garden. Excavations in the 1960s found no evidence of a church.

A plaque commemorating the house was unveiled on 7 October 2020 by the Chepstow Society.
