= Chepstow =

Town in Monmouthshire, Wales

Coordinates: 51.642°N 2.675°W

Chepstow: Welsh: Cas-gwent
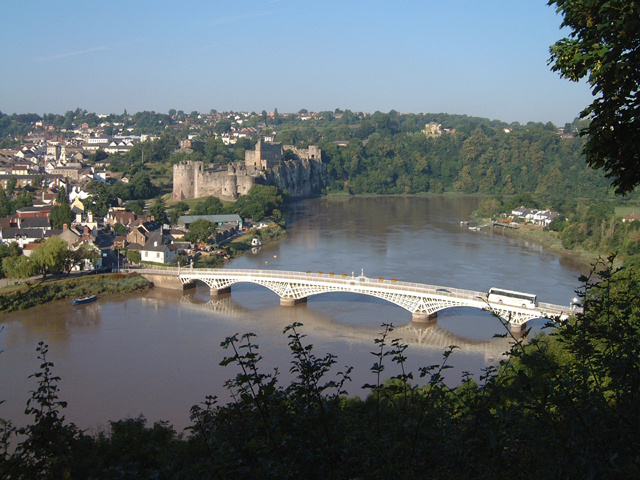
- Chepstow Castle and 1816 road bridge across the River Wye, seen from Tutshill

- Location within Monmouthshire
- Population: 11,900 (2021 census)
- OS grid reference: ST535935
- Principal area: Monmouthshire
- Preserved county: Gwent
- Country: Wales
- Sovereign state: United Kingdom
- Post town: CHEPSTOW
- Postcode district: NP16
- Dialling code: 01291
- Police: Gwent
- Fire: South Wales
- Ambulance: Welsh
- UK Parliament: Monmouthshire
- Senedd Cymru – Welsh Parliament: Monmouth

Chepstow (Welsh: Cas-gwent) is a town and community in Monmouthshire, Wales, adjoining the border with Gloucestershire, England. It is located on the tidal River Wye, about 2 miles (3 km) above its confluence with the River Severn, and adjoining the western end of the Severn Bridge. It is the easternmost settlement in Wales, situated 16 miles (26 km) east of Newport, 28 miles (45 km) east-northeast of Cardiff, 18 miles (29 km) northwest of Bristol and 110 miles (180 km) west of London.

Chepstow Castle, situated on a clifftop above the Wye and the old bridge, is often cited as the oldest surviving stone castle in Britain. The castle was established by William FitzOsbern immediately after the Norman Conquest, and was extended in later centuries before becoming ruined after the Civil War. A Benedictine priory was also established within the walled town, which was the centre of the Marcher lordship of Striguil. The port of Chepstow became noted in the Middle Ages for its imports of wine, and also became a major centre for the export of timber and bark, from nearby woodland in the Wye Valley and Forest of Dean. In the late eighteenth century the town was a focus of early tourism as part of the "Wye Tour", and the tourist industry remains important. Other important industries included shipbuilding – one of the First World War National Shipyards was established in the town – and heavy engineering, including the prefabrication of bridges and wind turbine towers. Chepstow is also well known for its racecourse, which has hosted the Welsh National each year since 1949.

The town had a population of 12,350 at the 2011 census, decreasing to 11,900 (rounded to the nearest 100) at the 2021 census. It is served by the M48 motorway, and its accessibility to the cities of Bristol, Newport and Cardiff means it has a large number of commuters. It is administered as part of Monmouthshire County Council, and is within the Monmouthshire UK parliamentary constituency and Monmouth Senedd constituency. Chepstow is on the western bank of the Wye, while adjoining villages on the eastern bank of the river, Tutshill and Sedbury, are in England. The population of the built-up area including these villages was 15,600 in 2021.

== Etymology ==
The name Chepstow derives from the Old English ceap/chepe stowe, meaning market place or trading centre. The word "stow" usually denotes a place of special significance, and the root chep is the same as that in other placenames such as Chipping Sodbury and Cheapside. The name is first recorded in 1307, but may have been used by the English in earlier centuries. However, the name used by the Normans for the castle and lordship was Striguil (in various spellings, such as Estrighoiel), probably derived from a Welsh word ystraigyl, meaning a bend in the river. The Welsh name Cas-gwent refers to the "castle of Gwent". The name Gwent itself derives from the Roman settlement Venta Silurum or 'Market of the Silures', now named Caerwent, 5 miles (8 km) west of Chepstow, which had been the Romano-British commercial centre of south-east Wales.

== History ==
=== Early settlement ===
The earliest recorded evidence of human activity in the Chepstow area are charcoal deposits, found in St Peter's Cave, at the base of Hardwick Cliff, Bulwark, dating from the Upper Paleolithic.

The oldest site of known habitation at Chepstow is at Thornwell, overlooking the estuaries of the Wye and Severn close to the modern M48 motorway junction, where archaeological investigations in advance of recent housing development revealed continuous human occupation from the Mesolithic period of around 5000 BC until the end of the Roman period, about 400 AD. There are also Iron Age fortified camps in the area, dating from the time of the Silures, at Bulwark, 1 mile (1.6 km) south of the town centre, and at Piercefield and Lancaut, some 1.5 miles (2.4 km) to the north. During the Roman occupation, there was a bridge or causeway across the Wye, about 0.6 miles (0.97 km) upstream of the later town bridge. Chepstow is located at a crossing point directly between the Roman towns at Gloucester (Glevum) and Caerwent (Venta Silurum). Although historians think it likely that there was a small Roman fort in the area, the only evidence found so far has been of Roman material and burials, rather than buildings.

After the Romans left, Chepstow was within the southern part of the Welsh kingdom of Gwent, known as Gwent Is-coed (i.e. Gwent this side of the woods). To the north of the modern town centre, a small church was established dedicated to St. Cynfarch (alternatively Cynmarch, Kynemark or Kingsmark), a disciple of St. Dyfrig. This later became the St Kynemark Priory on what is now Kingsmark Lane, but no traces of it remain. The town is close to the southern point of Offa's Dyke, which begins on the east bank of the Wye at Sedbury and runs all the way to the Irish Sea in north Wales. This was built in the late 8th century as a boundary between Mercia and the Welsh kingdoms, although some recent research has questioned whether the stretch near Chepstow formed part of the original Dyke. It is possible, though not clearly substantiated, that Chepstow may have superseded Caerwent as a trading centre, and been used by both Saxons and the Welsh. The Lancaut and Beachley peninsulas, opposite Chepstow, were in Welsh rather than Mercian control at that time, although by the time of the Domesday Book Striguil was assessed as part of Gloucestershire.

=== The Normans ===
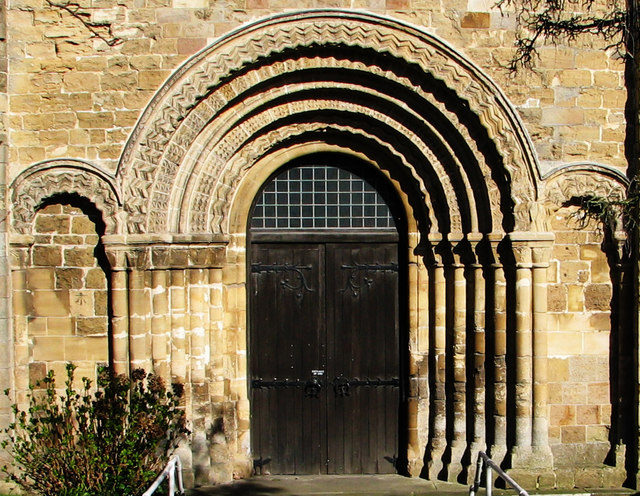
Norman doorway of St Mary's Priory Church

After the Norman conquest of England, Chepstow was a key location. It was at the lowest bridging point of the River Wye, provided a base from which to advance Norman control into south Wales, and controlled river access to Hereford and the Marches. Chepstow Castle was founded by William fitzOsbern, 1st Earl of Hereford, in 1067, and its Great Tower, often cited as the oldest surviving stone fortification in Britain, dates from that time or shortly afterwards. Its site, with sheer cliffs on one side and a natural valley on the other, afforded an excellent defensive location. A Benedictine priory, now St Mary's Church, was also established nearby. This was the centre of a small religious community, the remains of which are buried under the adjoining car park. Monks, originally from Cormeilles Abbey in Normandy, were there until the Dissolution of the Monasteries.

The castle was expanded by William Marshal in the late twelfth century and, a century later, by Roger Bigod, 5th Earl of Norfolk. Bigod was also responsible for establishing a weekly market and annual fair, in the town which had grown up on the slopes between the castle and priory, and for building the Port Wall around it shortly after 1274. A toll gate controlled entry to the market area; this Town Gate was rebuilt in the 16th century. The town faced some hostile attacks from the Welsh to the west, but after the 14th century the castle's importance diminished. The port of Chepstow developed during the medieval period, one reason being that its control by a Marcher Lord, rather than by the King, meant that it was exempt from English taxation. It mainly traded in timber and bark from the Wye Valley, and with Bristol. From medieval times, Chepstow was the largest port in Wales; its ships sailed as far as Iceland and Turkey, as well as to France and Portugal, and the town was known for its imports of wine.

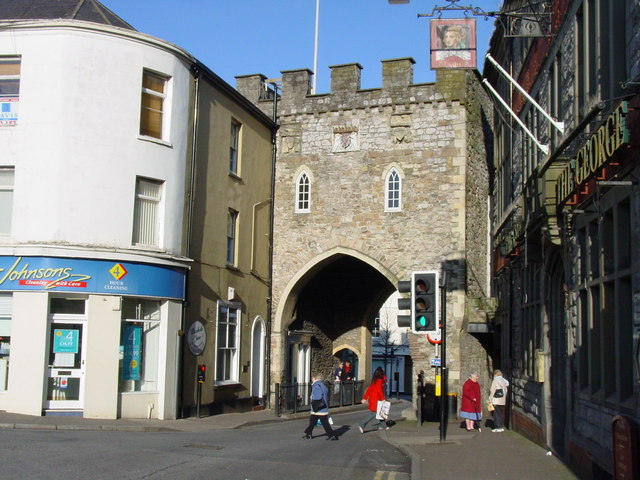
Chepstow Town Gate, originally dating from the late 13th century, rebuilt in the 16th century and later restored

=== Later history ===
Chepstow was given its first charter in 1524, by Charles Somerset, 1st Earl of Worcester, and became part of Monmouthshire when the county was formed. The town appears as "Strigulia", "Chepstowe" and "Castelh Gwent" on the Cambriae Typus map of 1573. The castle and town changed hands several times during the English Civil War, and the regicide Henry Marten was later imprisoned and died in the castle. The port continued to flourish; during the period 1790 to 1795, records show a greater tonnage of goods handled than Swansea, Cardiff and Newport combined. Chepstow reached the peak of its importance during the Napoleonic Wars, when its exports of timber, for ships, and bark, for leather tanning, were especially vital. There were also exports of wire and paper, made in the many mills on the tributaries of the Wye.

An important aspect of Chepstow's trade was entrepôt trade: bringing larger cargoes into the manageable deep water of the Wye on high tide and breaking down the load for on-shipment in the many trows up the Wye to Hereford past the coin stamping mill at Redbrook, or up the Severn to Gloucester and beyond. Chepstow also traded across the estuary to Bristol on suitable tides to work vessels up and down the Avon to that city's centre. Many buildings in the town remain from the late 18th and early 19th centuries; the elegant cast iron bridge across the Wye was opened in 1816 to replace an earlier wooden structure.

The town became an important centre for tourism from the late eighteenth century, when the "Wye Tour" became popular. Visitors regularly took boats from Ross-on-Wye and Monmouth down the river, visiting, drawing and painting the "picturesque" views of the area, which included those of Tintern Abbey, Piercefield House, and the ruined Chepstow Castle.

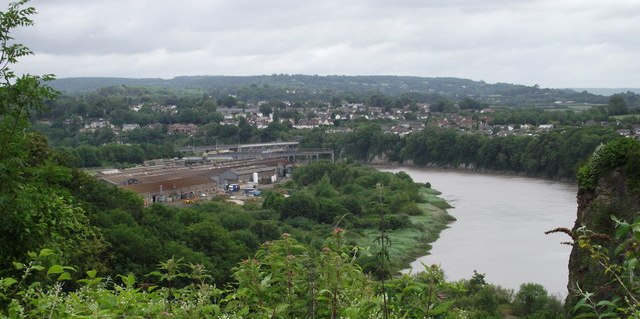
View towards the site of the former National Shipyard No.1, in the area covered by the factory buildings and overgrown slipways in the centre of the photograph

In the 19th century a shipbuilding industry developed, and the town was also known for the production of clocks, bells, and grindstones. In 1840 leaders of the Chartist insurrection in Newport were transported from Chepstow to Van Diemen's Land. The port's trade declined after the early 19th century, as Cardiff, Newport and Swansea became more suitable for handling the bulk export of coal and steel from the Glamorganshire and Monmouthshire valleys. However, shipbuilding was briefly revived when the National Shipyard No.1 was established during the First World War and for a short period afterwards, when the first prefabricated ships, including the War Glory, were constructed there. The influx of labour for the shipyards, from 1917, led to the start of "garden suburb" housing development at Hardwick (now known locally as "Garden City") and Bulwark. The shipyard itself became a works for fabricating major engineering structures. From 1938, Chepstow housed the head office of the Red & White bus company, on Bulwark Road.

New housing development in the twentieth century took place to the north and south of the town centre, and more recently beyond the A466 road to the west of the town. The town developed rapidly after the opening of the Severn Bridge in 1966, which replaced the car ferry between Beachley and Aust and allowed easier commuting between Chepstow and larger centres including Bristol and Cardiff. Over £2 million was invested in regenerating the town centre in 2004–05. This scheme, which includes sculptures and other public art, encountered some local criticism over its high cost, but gained several national awards reflecting its high design quality. The area beside the river has also been landscaped in association with a flood defence scheme.

== Geography ==
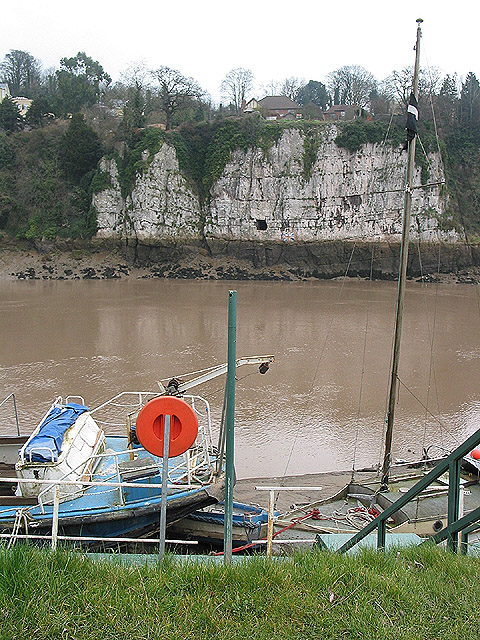
Limestone cliffs seen from the riverside at Chepstow, showing Gloucester Hole, an enlarged natural opening

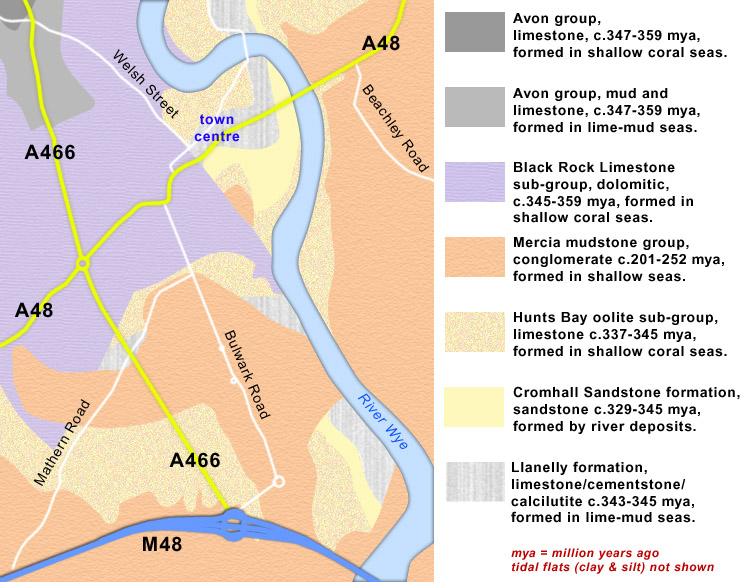
A map of the bedrock underlying Chepstow.

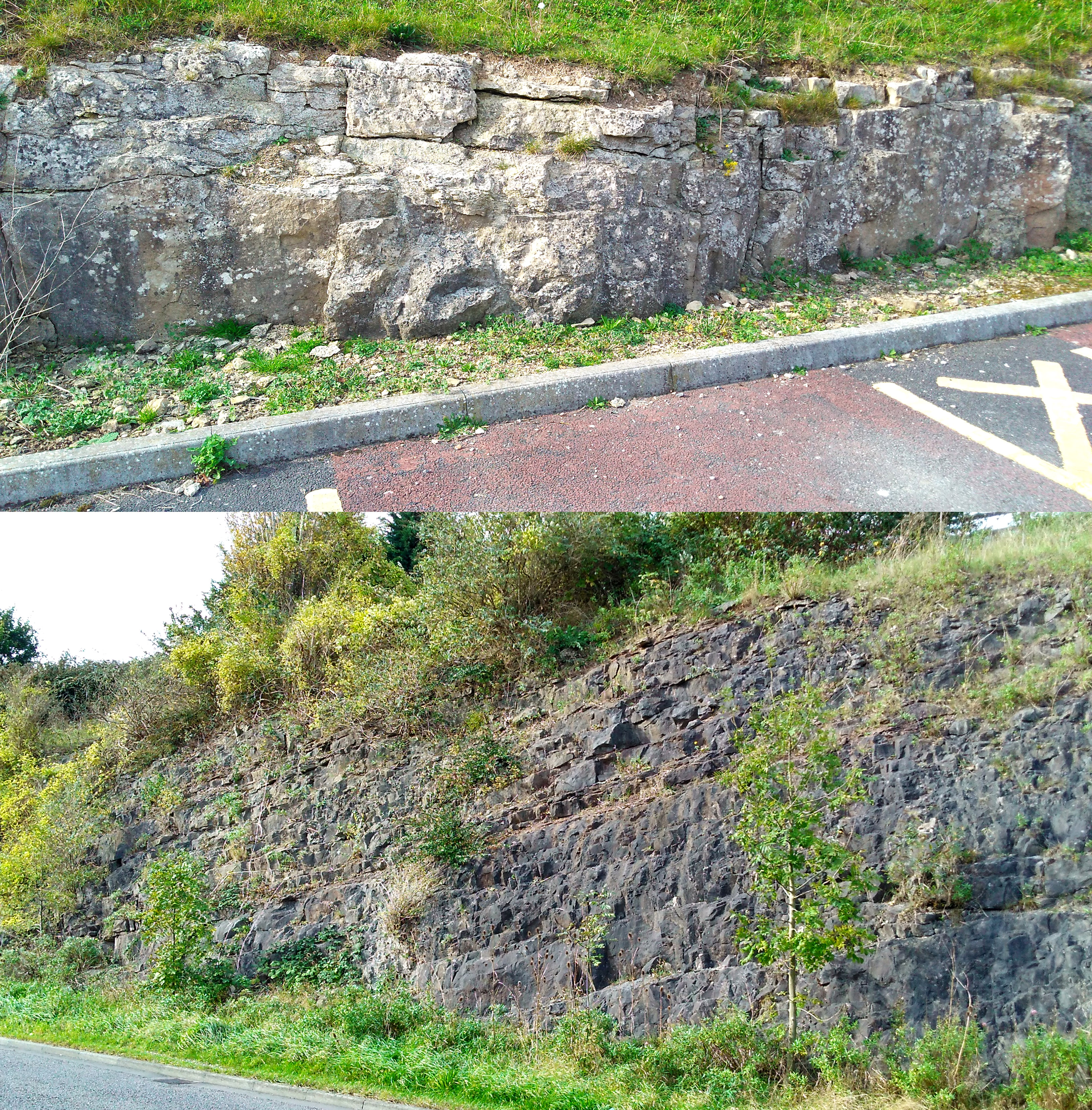
Two types of limestone exposed beside the A466 link road between Bulwark and the M48.

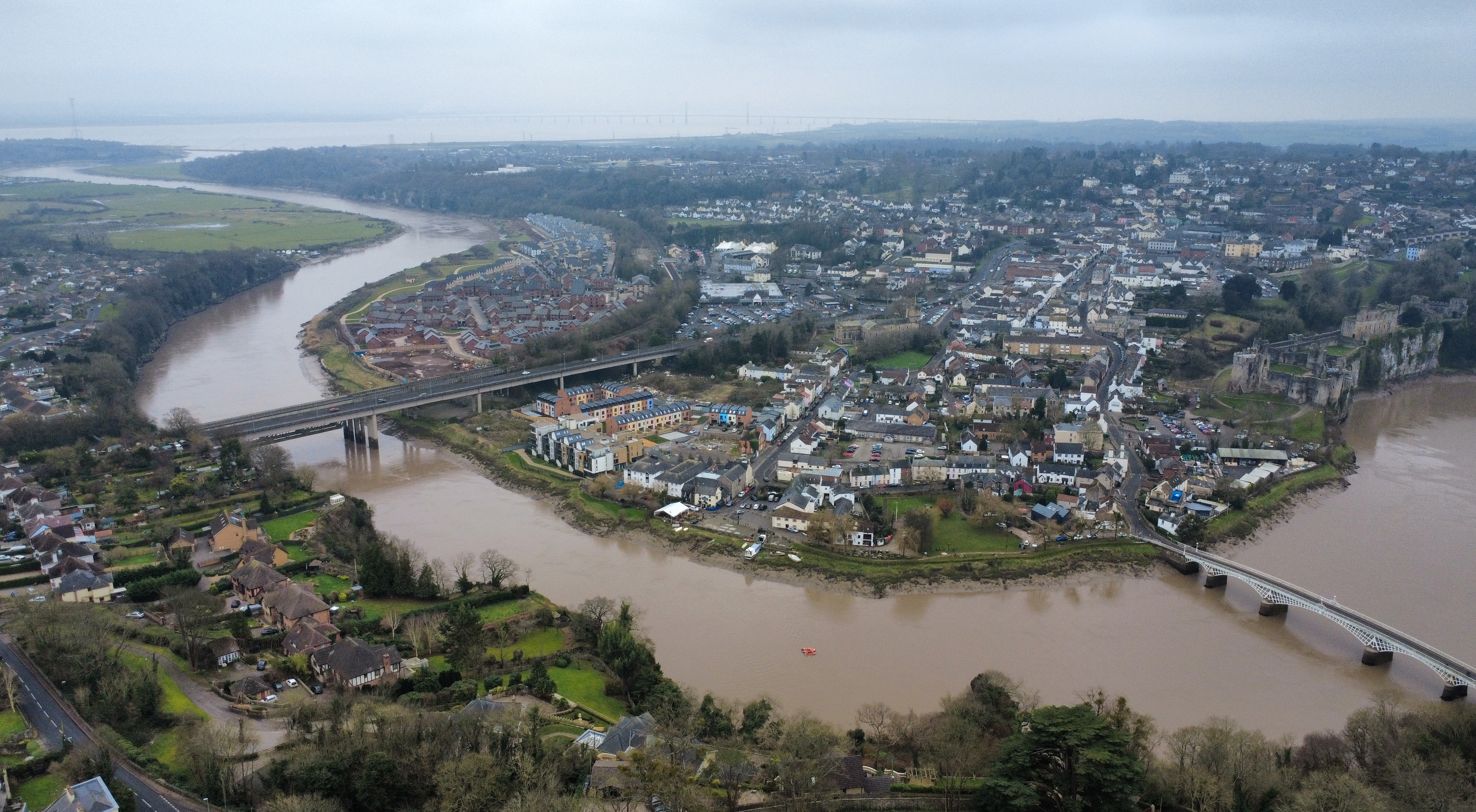
Chepstow and the River Wye from Tutshill area.

Chepstow is located on the west bank of the River Wye, some 3 miles (4.8 km) north of its confluence with the Severn estuary. To the north of the town, the Wye passes through a limestone gorge, and there are limestone cliffs at Chepstow both north and south of the town centre and on the opposite (east) side of the river. The town is overlooked by the inland cliffs at Wyndcliff near St Arvans, about 2 miles (3.2 km) north of the town, and, from parts of the town, the Severn estuary and its bridges can be seen. The historic centre of Chepstow occupies part of a bend in the River Wye, and slopes up from the river to the town centre and beyond. As well as cliffs used for rock climbing, percolation of acidic groundwater has dissolved limestone to produce caves in the area, including Otter Hole, one of the most decorated cave systems in Britain, which runs under the racecourse. The climate of the town is affected by its position close to the Severn estuary.

The bedrock of Chepstow is limestone, mudstone and sandstone, overlain in places with some gravels and the clay and silt of the river's tidal flats, which are of marine origin and up to two million years old. Most of the rock was produced in a warm, tropical marine environment, when Europe was closer to the equator. The rock of Sedbury cliffs and those under Chepstow Castle are Carboniferous Limestone, hundreds of metres thick in the area, made of particles and shells of sea creatures from 330 to 360 million years ago. Layered outcrops of darker Black Rock Limestone, which makes up a broad part of Chepstow's bedrock, are very clear in cliffs along Craig yr Afon, part of the Wales Coast Path extending from Wye Crescent, and by the link road from Bulwark Road to the M48, where the looser reddish Mercia Mudstone (which extends under Bulwark and Sedbury and forms the cliffs at the Severn) and the lighter Hunts Bay limestone are also seen.

The River Wye at Chepstow has one of the highest tidal ranges in the world. The river was established as a boundary between England and Wales by Athelstan in 928. However, after the Norman conquest, areas east of the Wye, within the former Saxon royal manor of Tidenham and including Beachley, Tutshill, Sedbury and Tidenham Chase, were included within the lordship of Striguil or Chepstow. In 1536, the river was confirmed as the boundary between Monmouthshire and Gloucestershire. Since the early 19th century, housing development has continued on the east bank of the river opposite Chepstow, at Tutshill and Sedbury. Those areas, though located in England rather than Wales, are now effectively suburbs of the town.

== Governance ==
Chepstow is administered by Monmouthshire County Council, one of the 22 unitary local authorities in Wales formed in 1996. As of 2022, the town elects six county councillors, for the wards of Bulwark and Thornwell (2 members); Chepstow Castle and Larkfield (2 members); Mount Pleasant; and St Kingsmark. Following the 2022 local elections, the councillors are four from the Labour party, and two Conservative. The town also has its own Town Council, comprising 15 councillors elected every four years. The council elects a Town Mayor from among its number each year. The Town Mayor for 2022/23 is Cllr Margaret Griffiths.

Chepstow was an electoral ward to Gwent County Council between 1973 and 1996. Its first councillor, Barney O'Neill, became leader of the council in 1974.

Chepstow was granted a town charter in 1524 by its Marcher Lord, Charles Somerset, 1st Earl of Worcester. After the county of Monmouth was formed, Chepstow was included within the Hundred of Caldicot in 1542. A Corporation of bailiffs and burgesses controlled the town until the time of Charles II, when its charter lapsed, apparently as a result of a dispute. The town came under the control of a Local Board from 1864, and an urban district council was formed in 1894. Chepstow Urban District Council was abolished in 1974, when many of its functions were taken over by the new Monmouth District Council. This was renamed Monmouth Borough Council in 1988, and formed one of the five districts of Gwent until both authorities were abolished in 1996.

The town's representation in Parliament was as part of the county of Monmouth seat, from 1536. Between 1885 and 1918 it formed part of the South Monmouthshire constituency, and then was in the Monmouth county constituency until 2024 when it became part of the Monmouthshire constituency. The town has remained within the Monmouth constituency in subsequent elections, although the constituency boundary has changed several times. The constituency has returned a Conservative MP at most recent elections; the current member is Catherine Fookes, elected in 2024. In elections for the Senedd, the town is part of the Monmouth constituency; the current MS is Peter Fox (Conservative). Until January 2020 Chepstow was within the Wales constituency for the European Parliament.

The Laws in Wales Acts created an anomaly in that, although Monmouthshire was noted as being in the 'Country or Dominion of Wales', it was made directly responsible to the courts of Westminster rather than falling under the Court of Great Sessions in Wales. Most legislation for Wales was applied to it using the phrase "Wales and Monmouthshire", and the issue of whether Monmouthshire should be considered as part of Wales for administrative purposes was finally clarified in law by the Local Government Act 1972 which incorporated it within Wales.

== Economy ==
Chepstow developed from medieval times as a port and trading centre. Its port functions, together with its shipbuilding industry, have now virtually ceased. The industries which developed on the shipyard sites, particularly the fabrication of major engineering structures by the Mabey Group, continued close to the town centre as well as on the Newhouse Farm industrial estate beside the M48 motorway, where wind turbine towers were assembled. In July 2015, the company announced that the site was to close with the loss of 125 jobs, following the decision by the UK government to end subsidies for onshore wind generation.

Other local industries have included the material for artificial ski slopes, developed at the "Dendix" brush factory, which in its time was a producer of all sizes of industrial brushes. The works, now operated by Osborn-Unipol, relocated out of the town centre to a new site beside the motorway in 2011. There are smaller industrial estates in Bulwark, and close to the town's railway station, and the Newhouse Farm industrial estate is also a major distribution centre. Other notable locally based businesses have included Architen Landrell, a manufacturer of tensile architectural structures, whose closure was announced in December 2015; and MVM Films, a distributor of Japanese animated films.

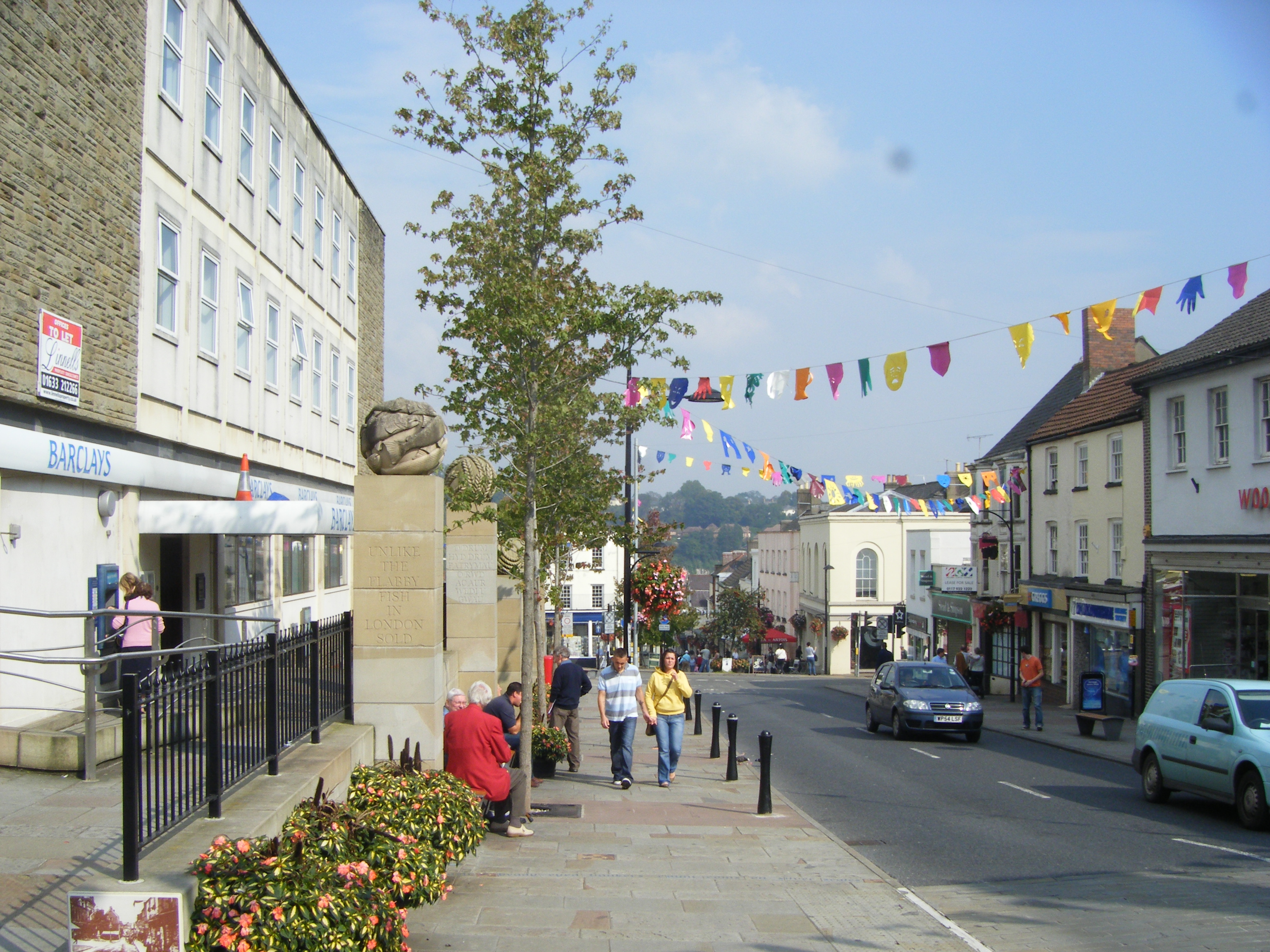
Chepstow High Street, showing festival bunting

Chepstow is primarily a centre for service industries and tourism in South West England and Wales. Due to its very good rail and road links, Chepstow has a large commuter population, commuters travel to larger centres in Bristol and in South Wales. Its location at the southern end of the Wye Valley, together with its own sights including its castle and racecourse, have contributed to its development as a tourist centre. The Chepstow Chamber of Commerce represents businesses in the town and aims to support and encourage their development. Blue plaques for English Heritage and other groups are made in the town.

Chepstow town centre has over 130 shops within easy walking distance of 1,000 car park spaces. There are 16 hotels, bars and public houses, and 15 restaurants and cafes. The town has Tesco and M&S Foodhall supermarkets, and Screwfix, within or adjoining the town centre, together with a Lidl store at Bulwark and a B & M store close to the motorway junction at Thornwell. The town has one bank and many independent cafes and restaurants. It also has several independent shops, though the family-run department store, Herbert Lewis, closed in 2018 after 140 years. National chains represented include TGJones, Peacocks, Boots, Superdrug, and Poundland. The pedestrianised St Mary's Street contains antique shops, gift shops, an independent book shop, coffee shops and restaurants. There are also regular farmers' markets and produce markets in the town centre. A regular open air weekly market at the racecourse closed in 2014. The town's livestock market closed in the early 1960s.

According to the 2001 Census, Chepstow had relatively high proportions of its population working in the retail and wholesale sectors of the economy (19.6%, compared with 16.3% for Wales as a whole), property services (11.3%, compared with 8.5% across Wales), and transport and communications (9.4% compared with 5.5% across Wales). The proportion working in manufacturing was lower than the average (15.2% compared with 17.3% across Wales), as was the proportion working in health and social work (9.3% compared to 13.0% across Wales). In terms of occupational groups, the proportions of residents in higher status managerial, professional and associate technical posts was higher than average (totalling 44.1% compared with 35.4% across Wales), and the proportions in administrative, personal services and processing work were lower.

In 2018 Chepstow was declared by campaign group Surfers Against Sewage to be the first "Plastic Free Town" in south Wales.

== Transport ==
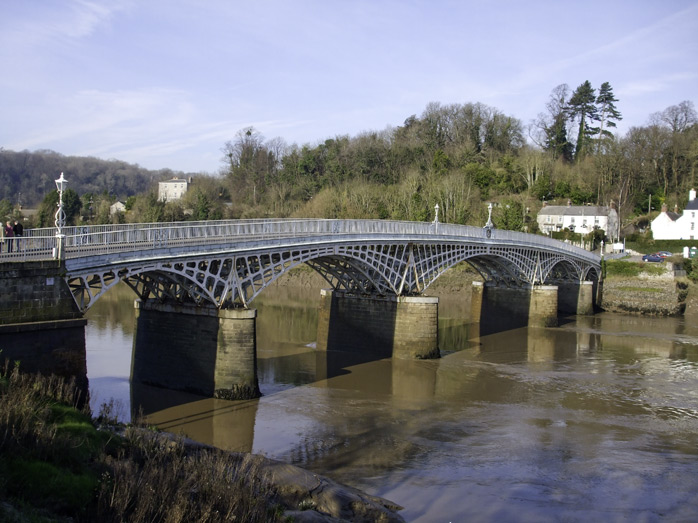
The 1816 Old Wye Bridge

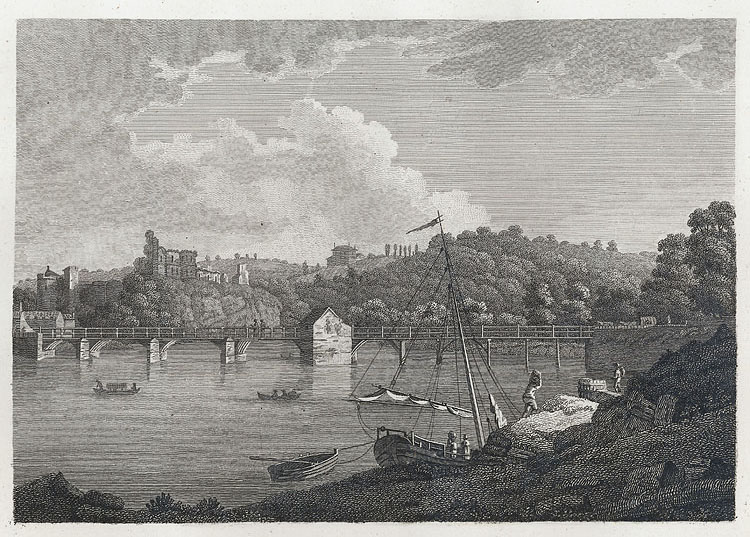
The Bridge and Castle at Chepstow at the end of the 18th century

Chepstow is located close to junction 2 of the M48 motorway, at the western end of the Severn Bridge. The bridge was opened in 1966 and has the second longest span of any bridge in the UK; it replaced the Aust-Beachley ferry. Before the Severn Bridge was opened, the Old Wye Bridge across the River Wye at Chepstow, built in 1816 to replace earlier wooden structures, carried all the road traffic between South West England and South Wales and was the lowest bridging point of the Wye. The M48 motorway now connects Chepstow by road to Newport (18 miles (29 km)) and Cardiff (31 miles (50 km)) to the west, and Bristol (18 miles (29 km)) and London (124 miles (200 km)) to the east. To the north, the A466 up the Wye valley connects the town with Monmouth (16 miles (26 km)), and to the north-east the A48 links it with Gloucester (29 miles (47 km)).

Chepstow railway station is on the main line between Maesteg and Cheltenham Spa. Most connections to Bristol Temple Meads and London Paddington are via Newport or Severn Tunnel Junction (8 miles (13 km)). Chepstow is serviced by Transport for Wales Rail; the service provided by CrossCountry from Cardiff Central to Nottingham, via Birmingham New Street. The railway bridge also known as "The Great Tubular Bridge" spanning the River Wye between Chepstow and Sedbury was designed by Isambard Kingdom Brunel in 1852 as part of the Great Western Railway, but the original structure was replaced in the 1960s. Until 1959, passenger trains also operated up the Wye Valley Railway to Monmouth – this service ceased owing to heavy financial losses. The line at Chepstow was blocked by a landslide on 12 November 2009, following heavy rain.

Chepstow was home to Red & White Services, one of the region's largest bus and coach operators. Their head office and central workshops were at Bulwark from the early 1930s to mid-1980s. Red & White was a major employer in Chepstow for the fifty years it existed. The company became defunct as part of the privatised National Welsh bus company but was re-established as Stagecoach Red & White following the acquisition of the assets of National Welsh by Stagecoach. Although the name Stagecoach Red and White was subsequently dropped, the legal name of Stagecoach South Wales is Red & White Services Ltd.

The nearest major airports to Chepstow are at Bristol (27 miles (43 km)) and Cardiff (43 miles (69 km)).

== Demographics ==
The population of Chepstow at the 2021 census was recorded as roughly 11,900. Of this, 23.4% were between the ages of 45 and 59, above the county average of 22.5%. The largest ethnic group is White with 96.4% of the population, below the county average of 96.9%, with the second largest being Asian/Asian British who make up 1.1% of the population, below the county average of 1.3%. The largest religious group is No religion with 47.4% of the population, above the county average of 43.4%, with the second largest being Christian at 45.1%, below the county average of 48.7%.

According to the 2021 census, 9.4% of Chepstow residents could speak, read or write Welsh, 2% could understand spoken Welsh only and 88.6% had no skills in Welsh at all.

== Education and health ==
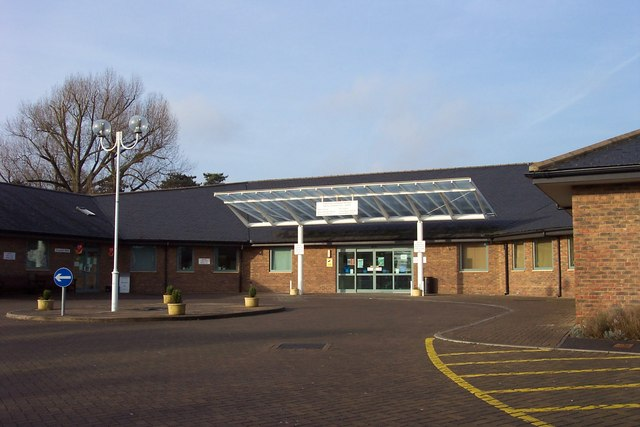
Chepstow Community Hospital

The town is served by Chepstow School, located on Welsh Street, with over 1,300 pupils. There are four primary schools in the town: The Dell, Pembroke, Thornwell, and St Mary's Roman Catholic. Tutshill and Sedbury, on the English side of the Wye but within walking distance of Chepstow and attracting some pupils from the town, have their own schools, including Wyedean School, and the private preparatory Dean Close St John's in Tutshill.

Chepstow Community Hospital was opened in 2000, having been developed under the United Kingdom Government's Private Finance Initiative. It was built and is operated by Kintra Ltd, at an annual charge of £1.2m to Gwent Healthcare NHS Trust. The hospital building incorporates mementoes from the past, including the old Admiralty portico moulding from the front facade of the former Mount Pleasant Hospital, which was located on an adjacent site now developed as a housing estate.

== Religion ==
In the 2021 census, 45.1% of Chepstow's resident population gave their religion as Christian, with 47.4% stating "no religion". There are several churches in the town. St Mary's Priory Church was founded by about 1072 as a Benedictine priory, and retains its ornamented Norman west entrance doorway, decorated with zig zag and lozenge patterns. The priory was suppressed during the Dissolution of the Monasteries in 1536, and became the parish church. It was substantially rebuilt during the nineteenth century, and now holds regular services as part of the Church in Wales. The Baptist Church, in Lower Church Street, was built in 1816, by Walter G. Watkin, and later enlarged. The origins of the Methodist Church lie in a visit to the town made by John Wesley in 1762. In 1801, a Methodist Chapel was built in what is now Oxford Street. St Christopher's church (Anglican), and St Mary's Roman Catholic Church, are both located in the Bulwark area.

== Culture and regular events ==
The town holds a biennial community festival, as well as an annual agricultural show and the annual Wassail and Mari Lwyd in January. There is a local Welsh society for the area, Cymdeithas Cymraeg Cas-gwent, Cil-y-coed a'r cyffiniau, holding numerous Welsh language events throughout the year that are open to all. In the early 2000s the community organised major son et lumière pageants covering aspects of local history, using local residents under professional direction. Since 2012, an annual series of "Castell Roc" music events has been held inside Chepstow Castle each August, featuring performances by artists such as Leo Sayer, Dr Hook, Bad Manners, and Jools Holland.

The Chepstow Museum, first established by the Chepstow Society, is housed in an elegant 1796 town house opposite the Castle entrance. Chepstow has no dedicated cinema or theatre, although film showings, theatrical and other events regularly take place in the Drill Hall, close to the Castle and riverside area. Chepstow is also home to the Electric Picture Hall, which organises regular 'pop-up' cinema events and a Welsh themed short film festival each year, with the long-term goal of establishing a dedicated cinema and performing arts space for the town. Group community activities also take place in the Palmer Community Centre and Bulwark Community Centre.

The town had, for a short period, its own online local radio station, Chepstow Radio.

Chepstow is twinned with Cormeilles, France.

The town is the base for The Widders Border Morris Men who were formed in 2001. Some of the members were bikers who coined the group's name, claiming they looked like the 'Black Widows', a bike gang from film Every Which Way but Loose. In 2010 the team were invited to represent Wales in a Celtic music festival in France. The black, skull-like face-paint, used by the team members, was originally used to mask identities. The team's foreman Mick Widder has described the group: "We’re from the dark side of Morris dancing. We’re the punk rockers of the morris world. We are drinkers with a dance problem."

== Media ==
Local news and television programmes are provided by BBC Cymru Wales and BBC West on BBC One, and by ITV Cymru Wales and ITV West Country on ITV1. Television signals are from either the Wenvoe TV transmitter, supplemented by a low power relay transmitter situated north east of the town, or the Mendip TV transmitter.

Local radio stations are BBC Radio Wales, BBC Radio Cymru, BBC Radio Bristol and BBC Radio Gloucestershire both can also be heard, Heart South Wales, Nation Radio Wales and Sunshine Radio.

The town is served by the local newspapers, Chepstow Beacon and South Wales Argus

== Sport and leisure ==
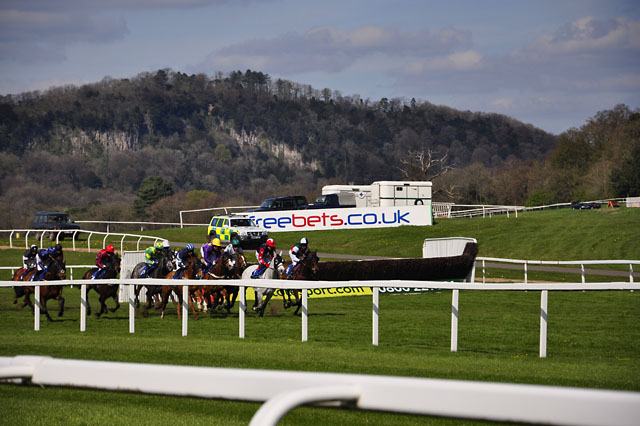
Horse racing at Chepstow racecourse

Chepstow Racecourse is the leading horse racing facility and course in Wales. It is located on the edge of the town, in the grounds of the ruined Piercefield House. The racecourse was opened in 1926, and became the regular venue of the Welsh National in 1949.

Chepstow Town F.C. was founded in 1878 and as of 2017 play in Division Three of the Welsh Football League. Chepstow RFC was also founded in 1878, by pupils and staff of Chepstow Grammar School. Matches are played at the Upton Memorial Ground, Lower Western Avenue. As of 2017 the team play in Division Three East A of the WRU National League The town also has an athletic Club for archery (St Kingsmark Bowmen), tennis, bowls, cricket and junior football. The 1976 IAAF World Cross Country Championships, won by Carlos Lopes, were held in the town. Two long routes of the National Cycle Network start in Chepstow, including the Celtic Trail (Lôn Geltaidd). Chepstow has also held professional and amateur street cycling events, such as the Chepstow Grand Prix.

The town's leisure centre is located adjoining Chepstow School. The centre is owned by Monmouthshire County Council. Its facilities include an indoor swimming pool and both indoor and outdoor games pitches. Chepstow Harriers running club, founded in the 1880s, meets twice weekly at the centre in addition to scheduled events.

Since its heyday as a centre for the "Wye Tour" in the late 18th and early 19th centuries, Chepstow has remained an important centre for tourism. The town has a range of hotels and guest houses. As well as its own attractions, including the castle, the town is close to other attractions including the Royal Forest of Dean, Tintern Abbey and the Wye Valley, the Marriott St Pierre Hotel and Country Club, and the National Diving and Activity Centre at Tidenham. Several long distance trails – the Offa's Dyke Path, the Wye Valley Walk, the Wales Coast Path, and the Gloucestershire Way – pass through, or very close to, the town.

Chepstow Golf Club (now defunct) was founded in 1914. The club disappeared in the 1960s.

== Landmarks ==
Chepstow contains five Grade I listed buildings – the Castle, Priory Church, Town Gate, Port Wall and Old Wye Bridge – and several with Grade II* listed status.

=== Chepstow Castle ===
Chepstow Castle overlooks the River Wye, a short distance downhill from the town centre. The Great Tower is the oldest part of the complex and dates from the late 11th century. The castle was extended, both westwards and eastwards, in later centuries, but fell into ruin after the Civil War. There is a large car park in front of the castle, beside the Tourist Information Centre and opposite Chepstow Museum. The castle is under the management of Cadw, and is open to the public every day of the year, apart from four bank holidays around Christmas and New Year. It is entered through the late-12th-century gatehouse, and contains exhibitions on the castle's history. A footpath beside the castle, through the Dell, is the start and finishing stretch of the Wye Valley Walk.

=== Town Gate and Port Wall ===
Much of Chepstow's late-13th-century Port Wall remains intact, although the stretch south of the railway line was demolished when the National Shipyard was constructed in 1916. The wall is best seen adjoining the main town car park in Welsh Street, or beside the main A48 road at the top of School Hill. It can also be seen adjoining the Gate House, which was built in 1609 beside the Town Gate at the top (western) end of the High Street. The Town Gate, now a single carriageway roadway controlled by traffic lights, was once the only point of entrance to the town centre other than the bridge below the castle. It was rebuilt in 1524 and has undergone several renovations since then, most recently in 1986. The Gate House and the room above the archway itself are occasionally opened to the public.

=== Priory Church of St Mary ===
Chepstow Priory was established in 1067, at the same time as the castle. Its Norman west doorway remains intact, as do some medieval and later interior features including Jacobean tombs. The Priory Church of St Mary became the town's parish church after the English Reformation. Its tower dates from the early 18th century, and the entire church was substantially rebuilt and extended in the mid-19th century, a process which destroyed some of its earlier features.

=== Bridges and the riverside ===
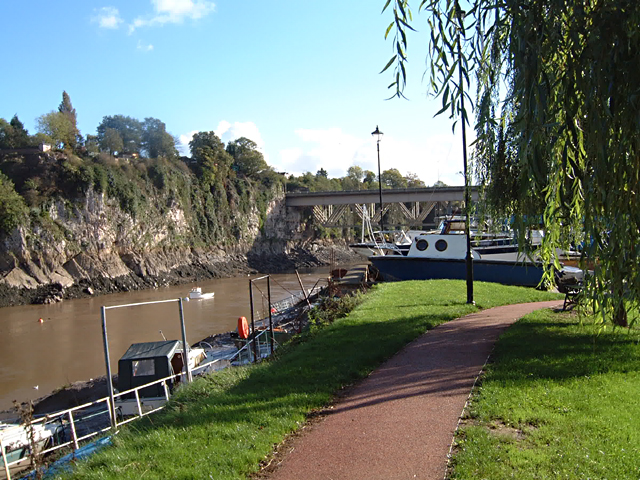
Path beside the river, near the start/finish of the Wales Coast Path

The Old Wye Bridge below the castle was built in 1816, on the site of earlier wooden bridges. The cast iron structure is noted for its elegance. It now carries a single carriageway road controlled by traffic lights. The eastern end of the bridge, in Gloucestershire, is the start and finish point of the Gloucestershire Way. The riverside area of Chepstow was once an open area of shipyards surrounded by warehouses. It has been landscaped, to incorporate flood defence works, and is now the start and finish point of the Wales Coast Path. The gardens contain a bandstand used for summer concerts. The Chepstow Railway Bridge, slightly downstream, was built to an innovative and functional design by Isambard Kingdom Brunel in 1852. Most of Brunel's structures have since been replaced. The railway bridge runs alongside the A48 road bridge opened in 1988.

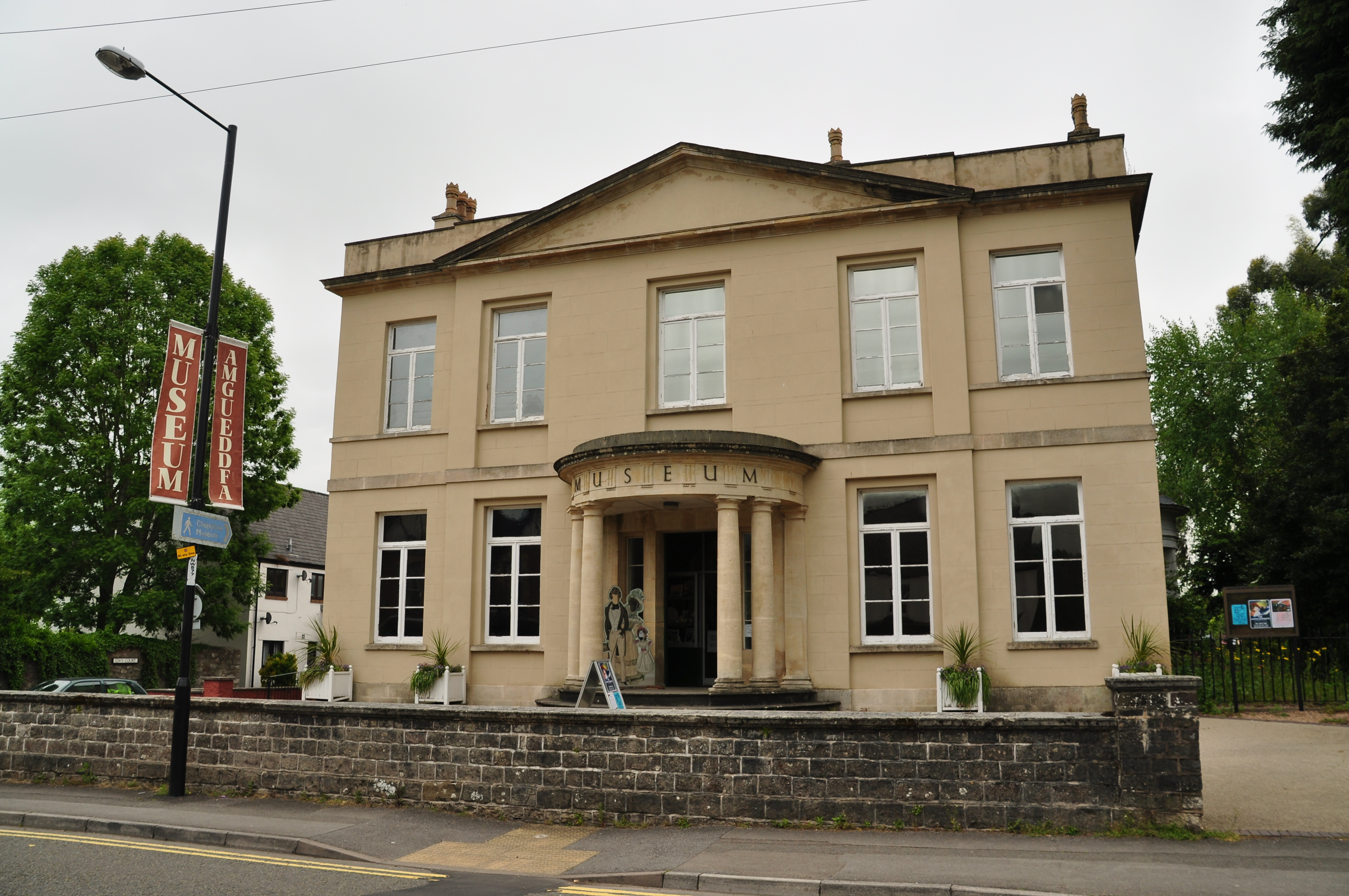
Chepstow Museum, in Gwy House, built 1796

=== Medieval and later buildings ===
The town contains several notable post-medieval buildings. Grade II* listed buildings include:

- Castle Terrace – a row of bay-fronted terraced houses, built in about 1810 on Bridge Street (then called St Anne's Street), the road leading down to the Castle;
- Powis Almshouses – an L-shaped stone-built block of almshouses at the top of Bridge Street, built in 1721 following a bequest from a locally born vintner, Thomas Powis, who worked in London;
- Raglan Lodge – a Regency building in the town centre, Beaufort Square, built above a vaulted stone cellar which may have been a town hall or administrative centre for the medieval lordship.

The heyday of the town's prosperity as a trading port in the late 18th and early 19th century is shown by the large number of town houses of that period, many of which are now used for other purposes such as offices and shops. One example is Gwy House, built in 1796 for a leading local merchant, which now houses the museum. The town centre itself features stone carvings, artworks, and information plaques placed in the pavement and walls, installed as part of a regeneration scheme in 2004/05; they illustrate Chepstow's history.

=== Chepstow Racecourse and Piercefield ===
Chepstow Racecourse was opened in 1926 in the grounds of Piercefield House, 1 mile (1.6 km) north of the town centre on the road towards Tintern. Piercefield House itself, a mansion house rebuilt in the late 18th century, is now ruined. Its wooded grounds, overlooking the River Wye, contain landscaped features from the time when visits to the estate were an important component of the "Wye Tour"; they are now incorporated into the Wye Valley Walk.

== Notable people ==
Chepstow was the birthplace of the fraudster and "Popish Plot" informer William Bedloe (1650–1680), and of the physician and satirist James Davis (1706/07–1755). James Stephens (1821–1889), a stonemason who was a supporter of the Chartists and later an influential Australian trade unionist, was born in the town, as was Sir Isambard Owen (1857–1927), a physician who became an academic and a leading figure in the formation of the University of Wales. John Fitchett Marsh (1818–1880), who had been responsible for establishing the first municipal library at Warrington, retired to Hardwick Court at Chepstow in 1873 and wrote on the history of the castle. The entomologist Eleanor Anne Ormerod (1828–1901) was born at nearby Sedbury Park, the house owned by her father, the antiquary George Ormerod. H.E. Fulford (1859–1929), born in Chepstow of Australian parents, joined the British Foreign Service and for several decades occupied important consular posts in China.

Able Seaman William Charles Williams (1880–1915), who was born in Shropshire but raised in Chepstow, was posthumously awarded the Victoria Cross for gallantry in World War I. A gun from a captured German U-boat was presented to the town to mark his bravery, and stands in the town's main square beside the Chepstow War Memorial. The neo-Baroque War Memorial itself was designed by local architect Eric Francis (1887–1976), who was also responsible for several notable country houses in the area.

Sportsmen born in the town have included Surrey and Middlesex cricketer Ted Pooley (1842–1907); Eddie Parris (1911–1971), the first black player to play international football for Wales; Olympic gold medal winning show jumper Richard Meade (1938–2015); and two more Wales international footballers, Ollie Burton (born 1941) and Paul Parry (born 1980). In the field of entertainment, locally born figures have included Grant Nicholas (born 1967) of the band Feeder, who grew up in the neighbouring village of Pwllmeyric, and film and television actor Owain Yeoman (born 1978), star of The Mentalist. The actor Leslie Sands lived in Chepstow before his death in 2001.

The writer J. K. Rowling (born 1965), author of the Harry Potter books, lived in the adjoining village of Tutshill from the age of 9, and attended secondary school at Wyedean School. Horticulturalist and writer Adam Alexander maintains a 3.5 acre farm at Itton near Chepstow.

== Gallery ==
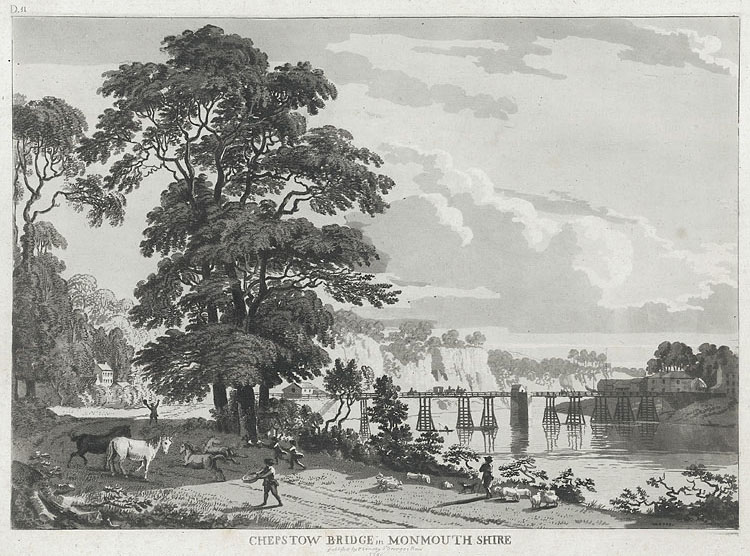
Chepstow bridge by Paul Sandby, b&w aquatint 1786

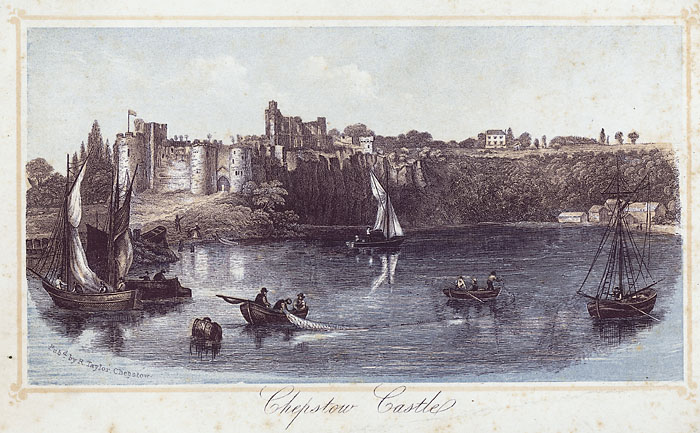
Chepstow Castle; engraving by R. Taylor, ca 1850

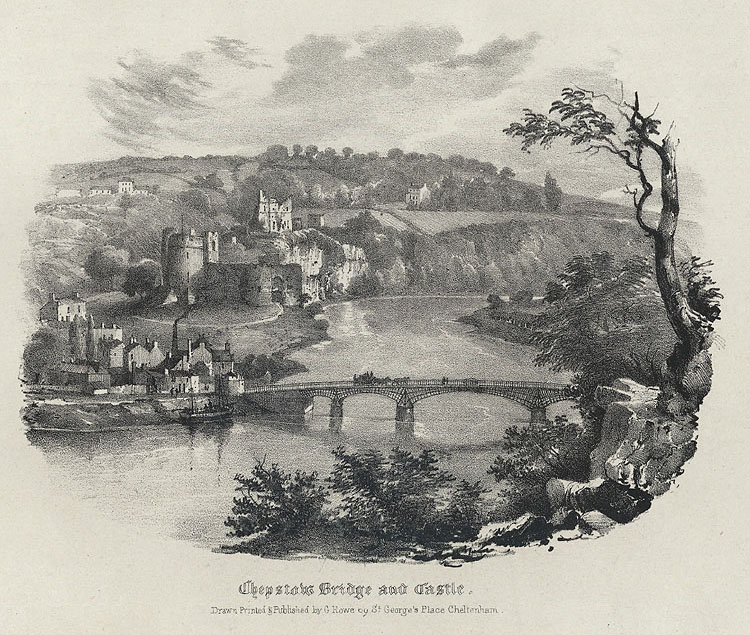
Chepstow bridge and castle by George Rowe, c. 1850

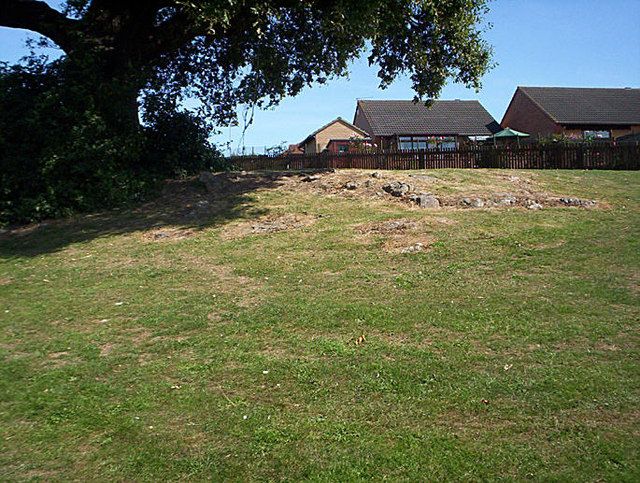
Remains of Neolithic chambered tomb at Thornwell

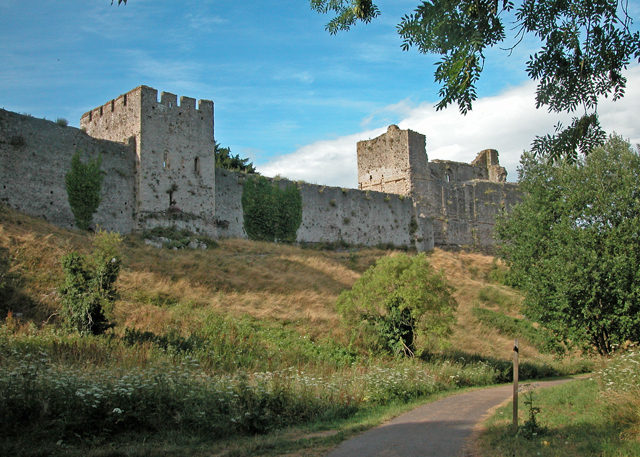
The castle, pictured from the footpath through the Dell, part of the Wye Valley Walk

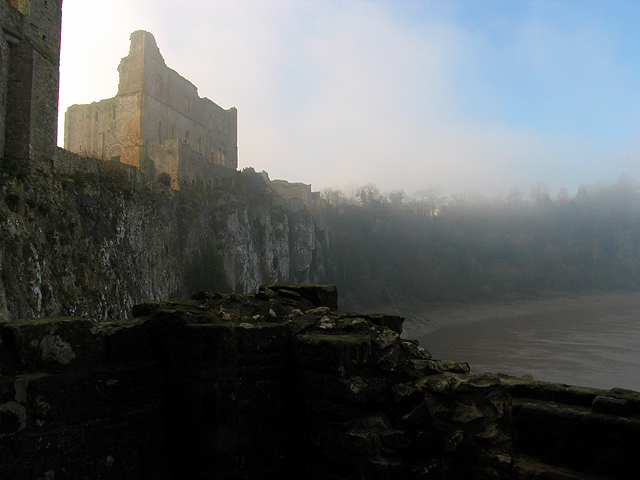
The Great Tower of the castle, above the Wye

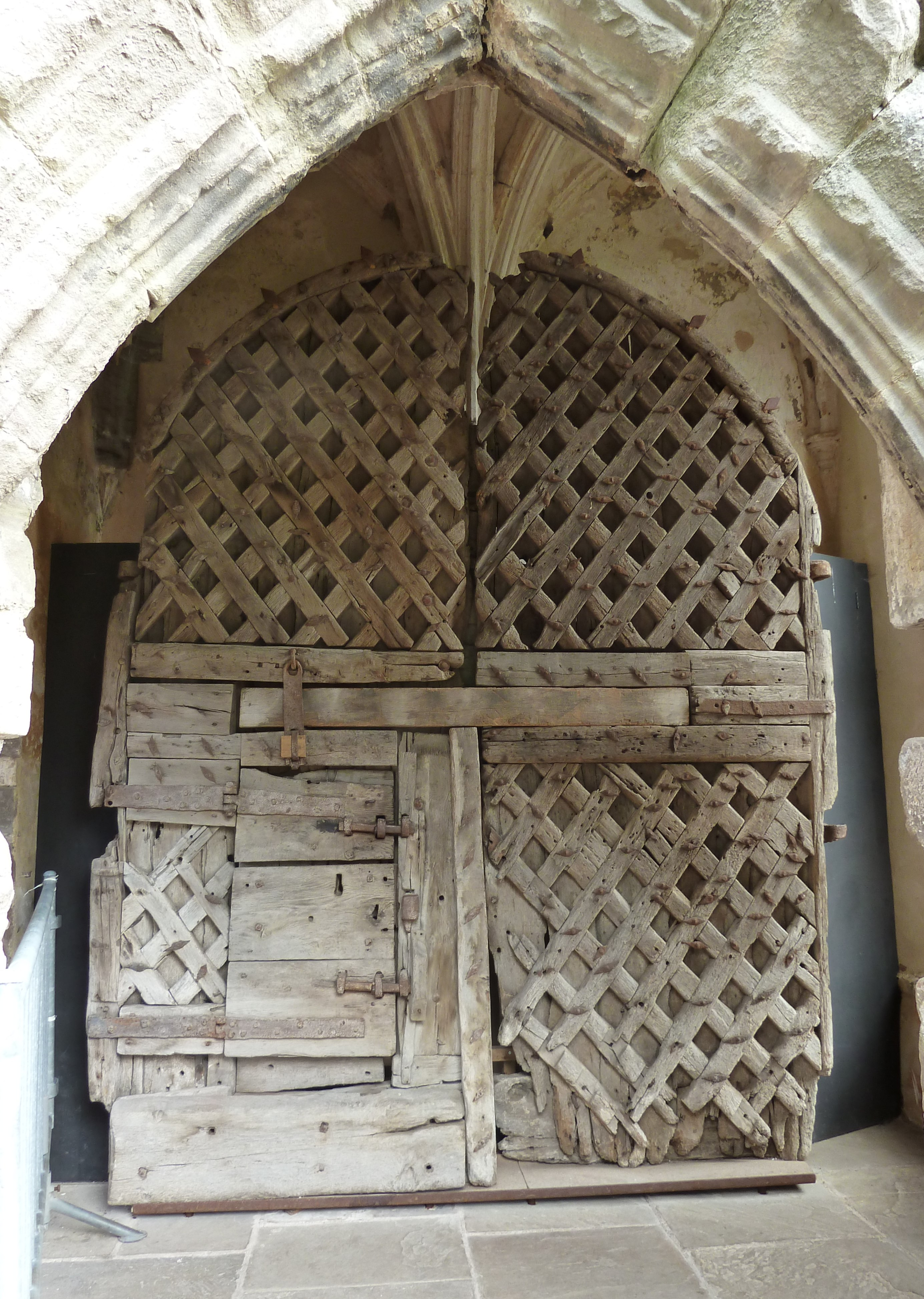
Twelfth-century wooden door at the castle

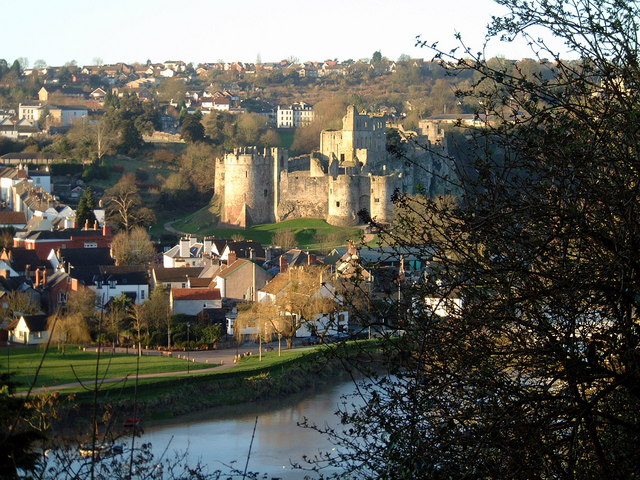
The castle and Riverside gardens

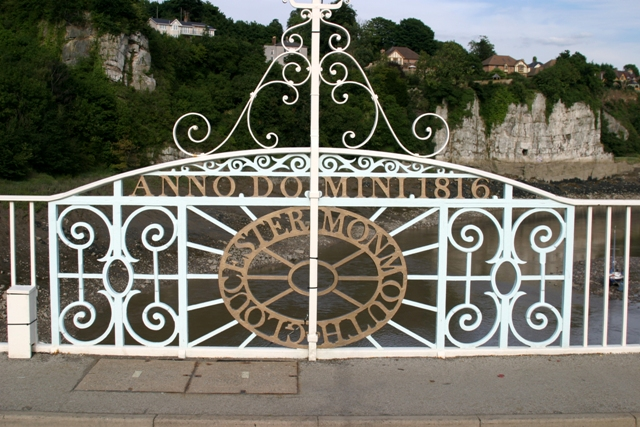
Decorative ironwork on the Wye bridge

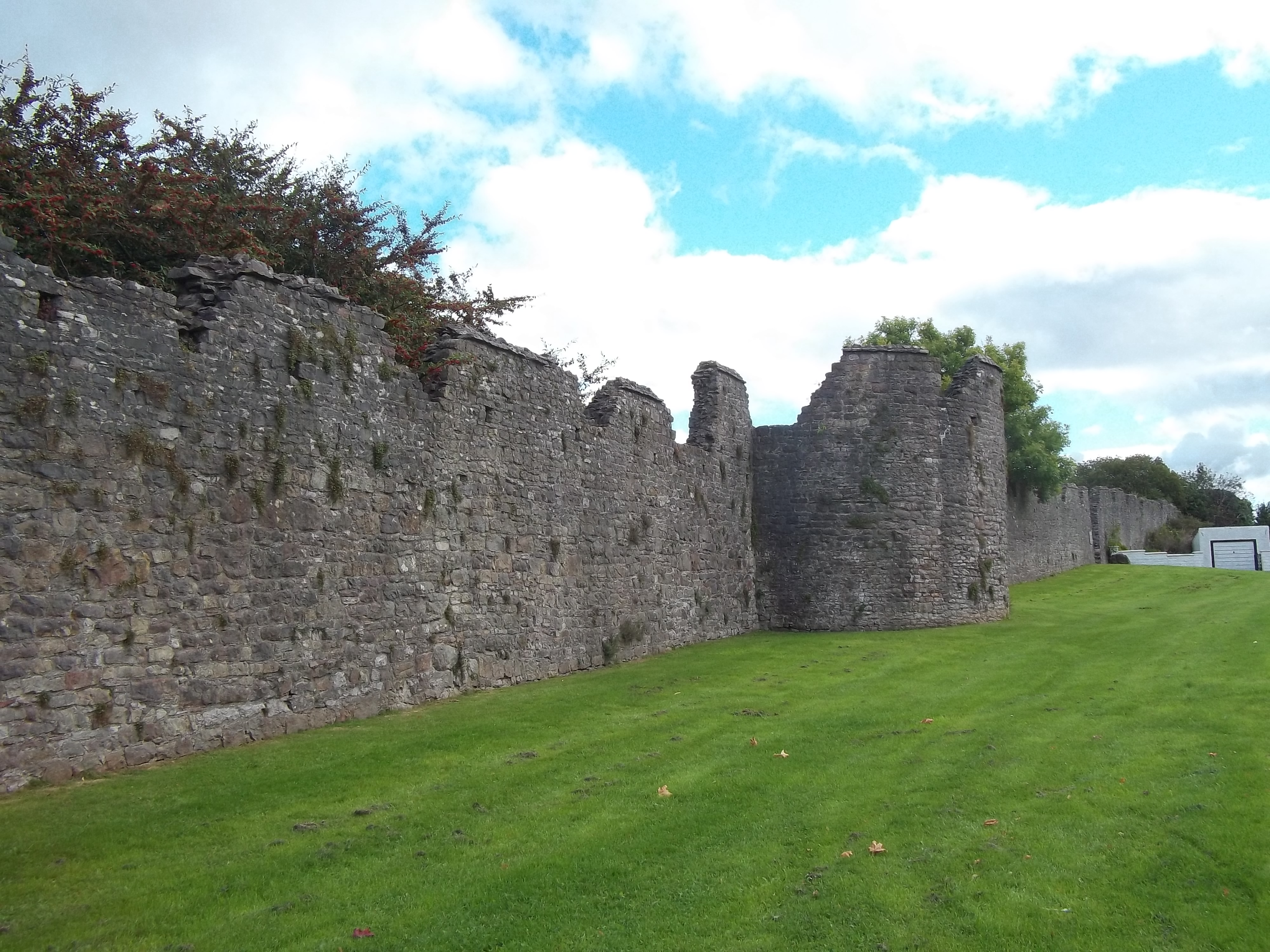
Part of the Port Wall

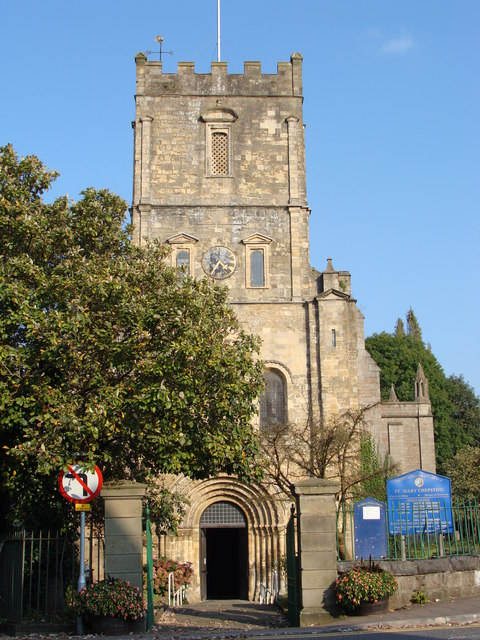
St Mary's Priory Church

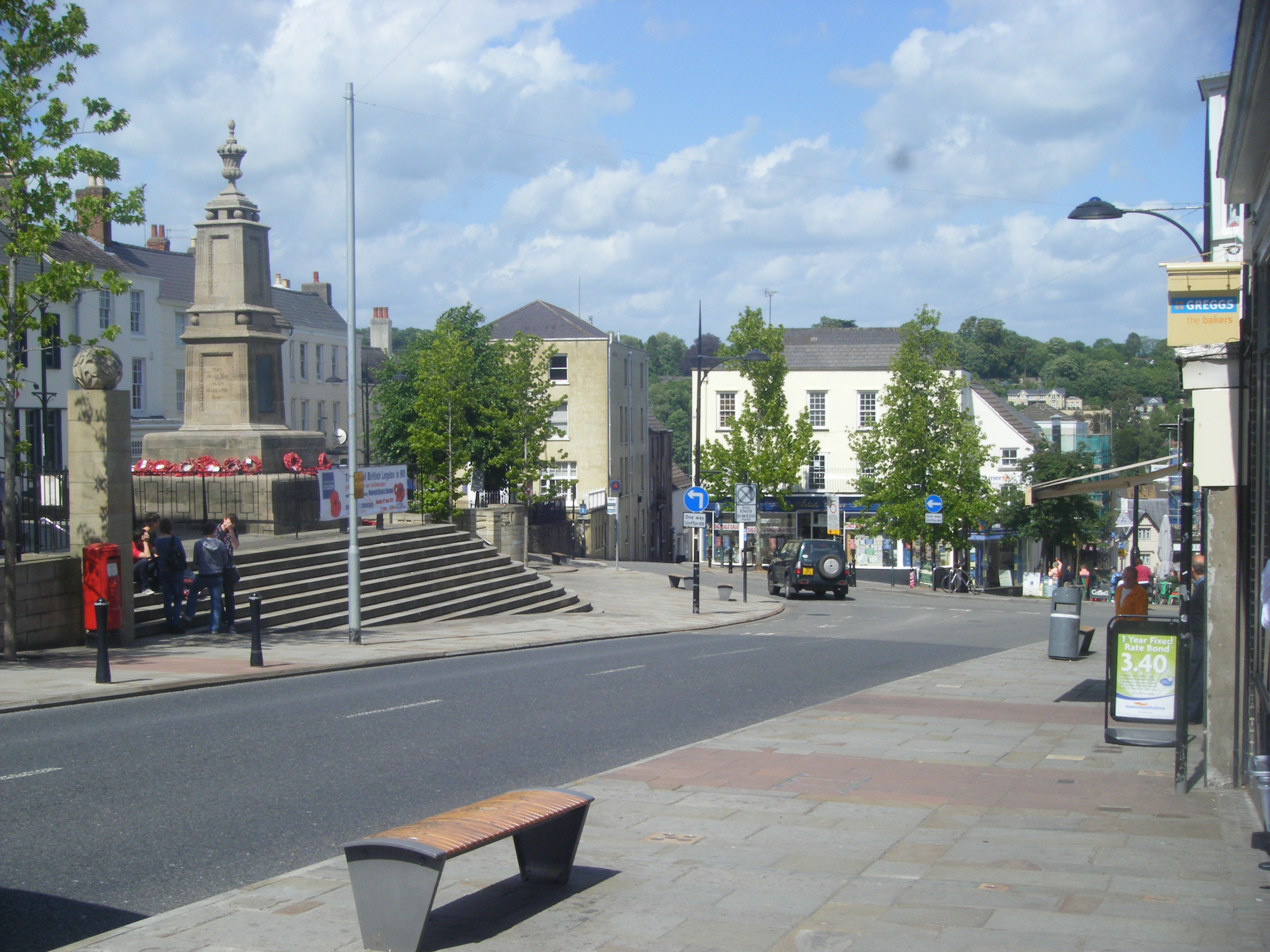
The town centre and war memorial

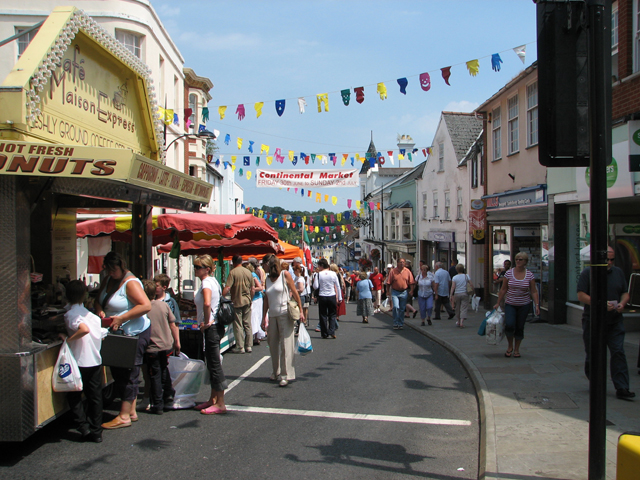
Continental market in the High Street

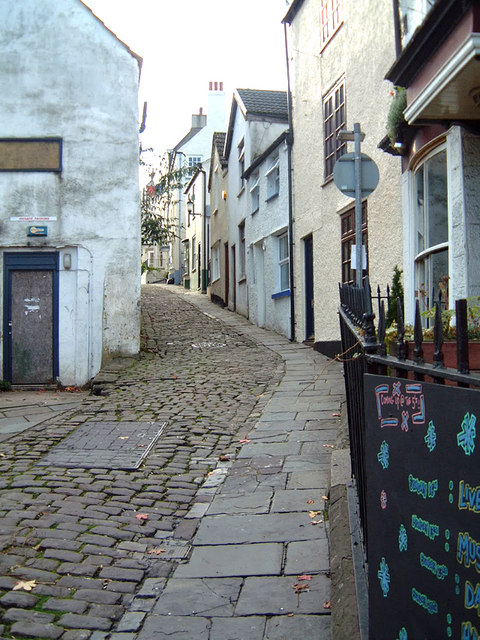
Hocker Hill Street, an old cobbled street in the town centre

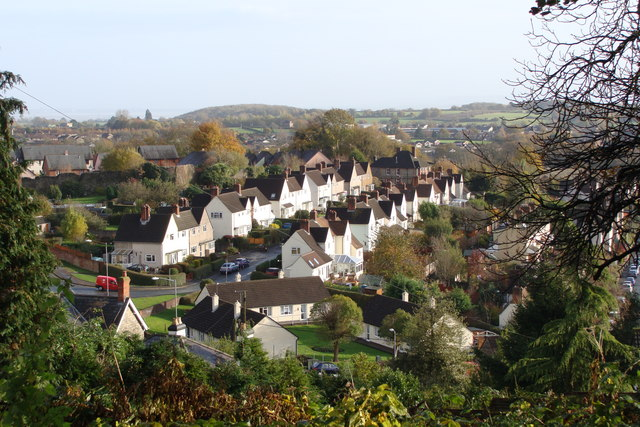
Houses in Hardwick Garden City

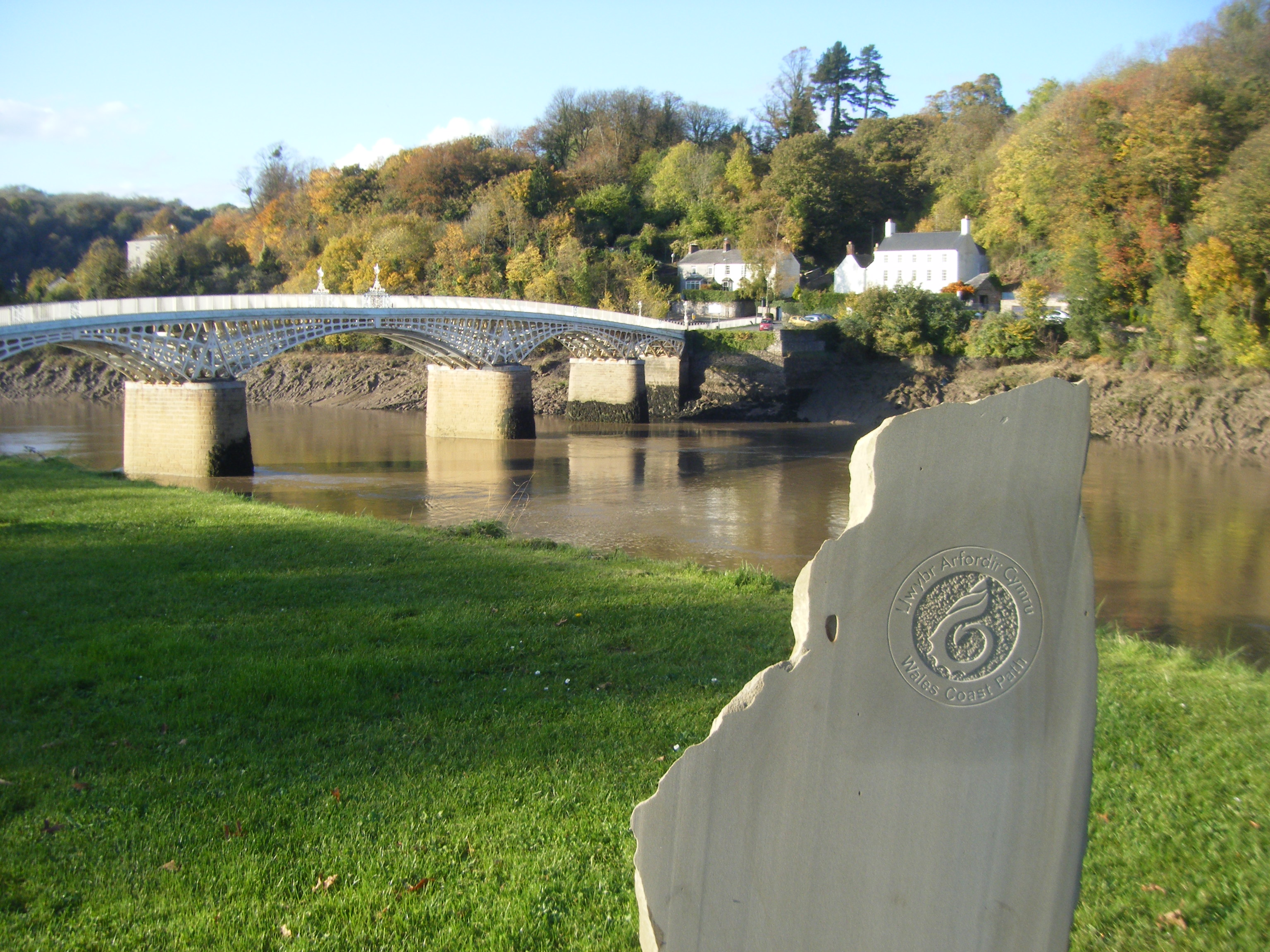
The start (and finish) point of the Wales Coast Path at Chepstow
