= Gloucester Hole =

Natural rock formation with a history of uses

Coordinates: 51.6460°N 2.6684°W

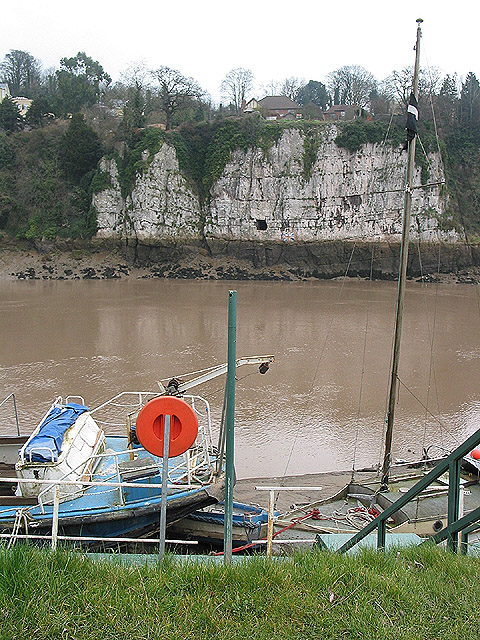
The River Wye at Chepstow, showing the Gloucester Hole

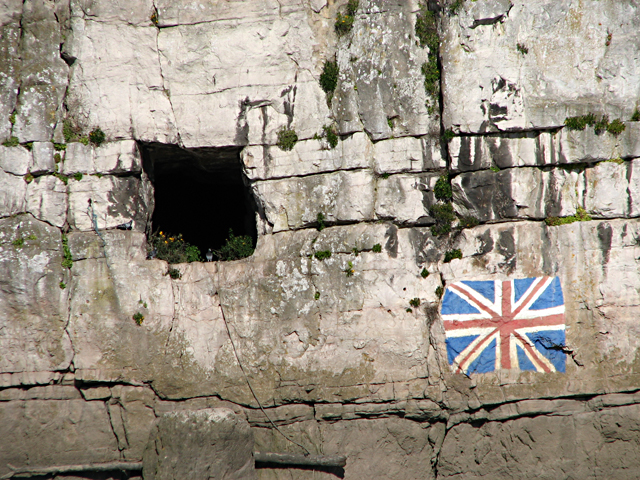
Close-up of the Hole and flag

The Gloucester Hole is a roughly square opening in the limestone cliffs of the River Wye, directly opposite the town of Chepstow. The hole itself is on the Tutshill side of the river, in Gloucestershire, England; the river forms the boundary with Wales.

The small square opening leads into a much larger chamber within the cliffs. The entrance is about 5 feet 6 inches (1.7 m) square, and runs in for about 12 feet (3.7 m). The cave was a natural opening in the limestone which was enlarged so that its greatest depth and greatest breadth are 27 feet (8.2 m), and its height at one point is 15 feet (4.6 m). There is speculation about its origin and about what it has been used for in the past. Suggestions include its use by the Shirenewton Quakers for storing tea, or for the storing of explosives by Brunel when the railway was built. A local antiquarian, J.G. Wood, wrote in 1901 that nearly 50 years earlier he had quizzed the oldest inhabitants and discovered that this natural cave had been enlarged and fitted with a crane at its mouth to unload large ships that could moor there in deep water, but could not easily dock at the shallower wharves on the Chepstow side of the river. The cargo was then reloaded onto trows and taken up river to Monmouth and Hereford. For many years mooring chains and rings in the cliff below survived to support this explanation. The cave can only be reached by boat at high tide.

Next to the Hole is a Union Flag which was first painted in 1935 to mark the Silver Jubilee of King George V by some Chepstow salmon fishermen, and is regularly repainted. The highest tides reach nearly to the top of it. During flooding in January 2014, the water level rose above the flag for the first time in many years.

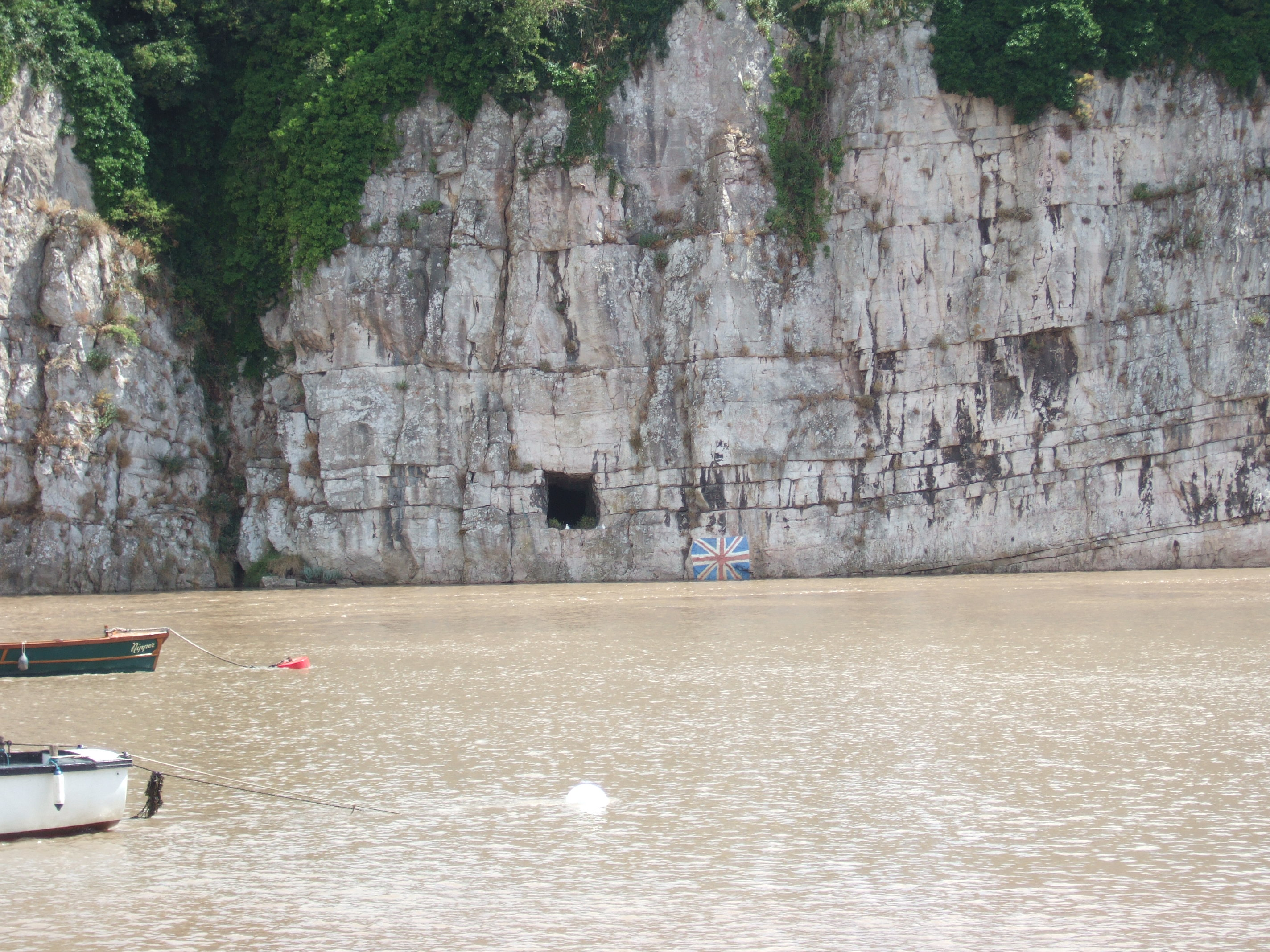
High tide

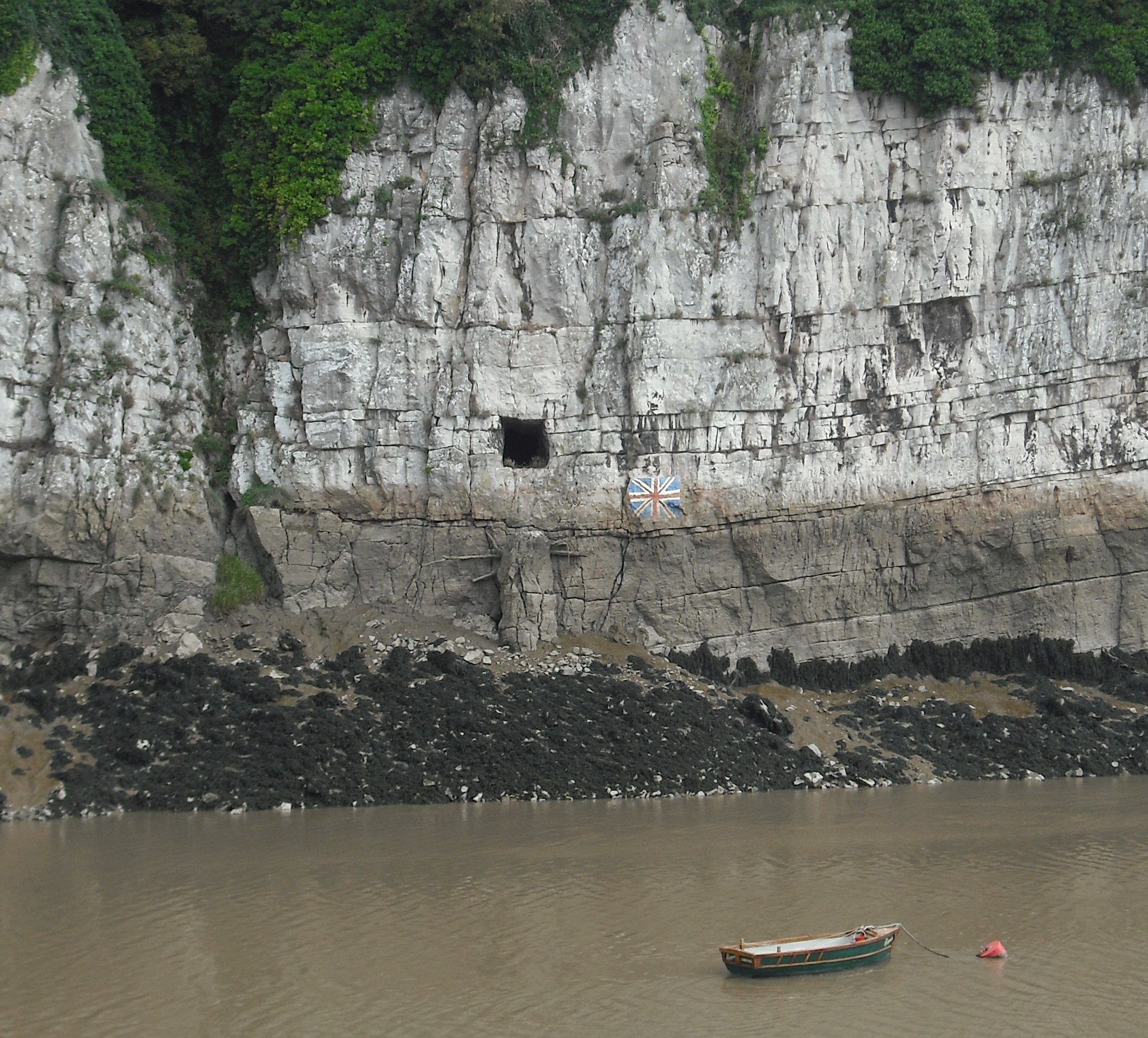
Low tide
