= Avon Group =

- Stratigraphic range: Lower Carboniferous
- Type: Group
- Unit of: Carboniferous Limestone Supergroup
- Sub-units: Tongwynlais Formation, Castell Coch Limestone Formation, Cwmyniscoy Mudstone Formation, Shirehampton Formation, Jackie Parr Limestone Formation
- Underlies: Pembroke Limestone Group
- Overlies: Upper Old Red Sandstone
- Thickness: 10m to 156m

Lithology
- Primary: mudstone
- Other: packstone, grainstone

Location
- Region: South Wales, Somerset
- Country: United Kingdom
- Extent: South Wales, Somerset, Gloucestershire, Shropshire

Type section
- Named for: Avon Gorge

The Avon Group is a stratigraphic unit of Courceyan age (Lower Carboniferous) found in southern Wales and the west of England. It forms part of the Carboniferous Limestone Supergroup. The term replaces the old 'Lower limestone Shale Group' of this region.

It is typically shown undivided on geological maps though three formations are identified on mapping of parts of South wales, namely the Tongwynlais, Castell Coch Limestone and Cwmyniscoy Mudstone formations as defined by Waters and Lawrence (1987). The Shirehampton Formation was recognised in the Bristol area by Barton et al (2002). The entire Avon succession is referred to as the Jackie Parr Limestone Formation (Bridge & Hough (2002)) where it outcrops at Clee Hill and Little Wenlock in Shropshire.

== See also ==
- List of types of limestone
