= Wye Tour =

British excursion along the River Wye

The Wye Tour was an excursion past and through a series of scenic buildings, natural phenomena, and factories located along the River Wye. It was a popular destination for British travellers from 1782 to around 1850, and reached its peak popularity during the Napoleonic Wars, when travel (especially the Grand Tour) to Continental Europe was not an option.

== History ==
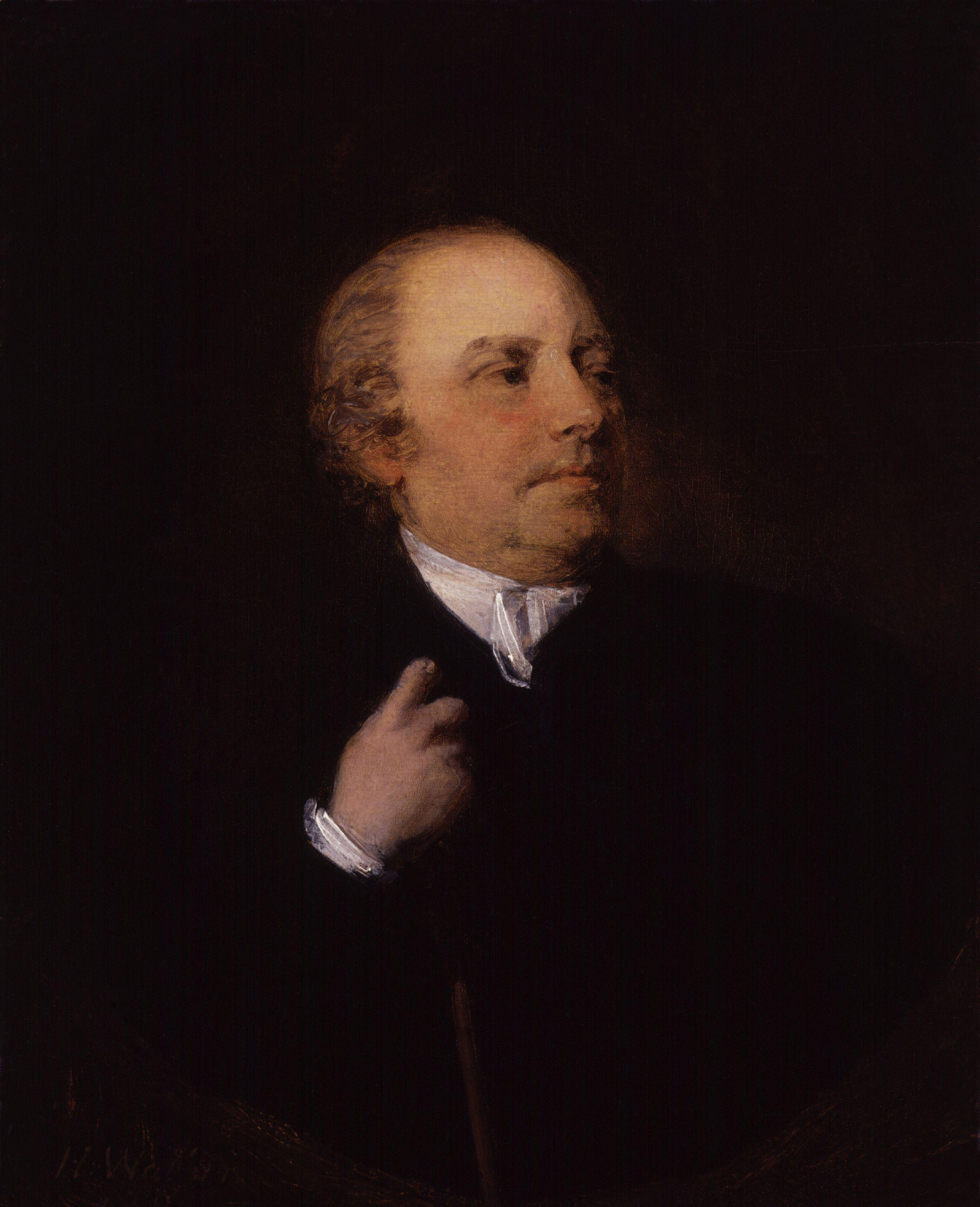
William Gilpin, who popularised the Wye Tour in the late 18th-century

Although tourists had been travelling down the River Wye since the middle of the 18th century, the Wye Tour became a must-see series of destinations after the publication of William Gilpin's Observations on the River Wye and several parts of South Wales, etc. relative chiefly to Picturesque Beauty; made in the summer of the year 1770, which established the Wye valley as an area rich in Picturesque scenes. After Observations was published in 1782, travellers from all across Britain flocked to Ross-on-Wye, typically used as a launching point for the Tour, and sailed downriver to Chepstow, the Tour's final destination, over a course of two days.

For British travellers unable to travel to continental Europe during the Napoleonic Wars, the Wye Tour became a replacement for the Grand Tour. In his Wye Tour (1818), Thomas Dudley Fosbroke compared the Wye Tour to the Grecian Tempe (he called the Tour "a portrait of the celebrated Grecian Tempe enlarged"), thereby elevating the Wye Tour "to the highest level of classical beauty".

During the early 19th century, the popularity of the Wye and other Picturesque Tours skyrocketed. Thousands of tourists descended upon Ross-on-Wye each summer to take a Picturesque tour, and to appreciate scenery that the fastidious Gilpin had declared "properly Picturesque". During this time, Wye Tourists (and seekers of the Picturesque in general) were widely lampooned by British caricaturists (e.g. William Combe's The Adventures of Dr. Syntax, In Search of the Picturesque) and satirical poets, who mocked their ignorance of local customs, single-minded pursuit of Picturesque views, and disregard for one another. Despite this (frequently accurate) criticism, the popularity of the tour endured until the middle of the 19th century – well after the end of the Napoleonic Wars and the Picturesque fad. Wye Tour destinations like Tintern Abbey remain some of the most popular weekend destinations for British tourists to the present day

== The Tour ==
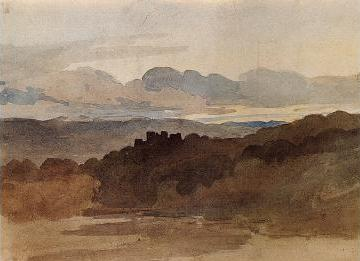
The picturesque ruins of Goodrich Castle inspired many artists who took the Wye Tour, including David Cox, who produced this watercolour in 1815.

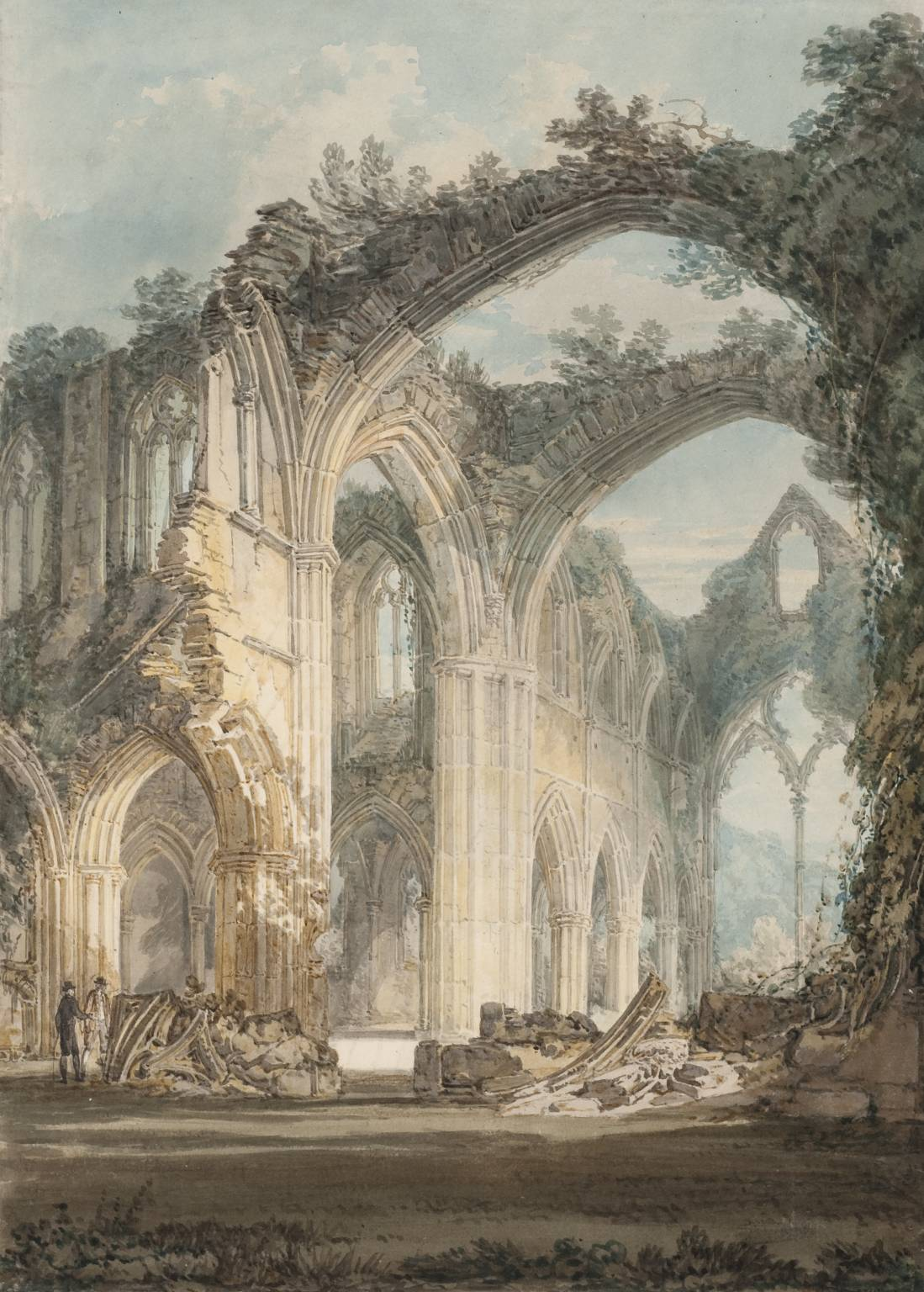
The Chancel and Crossing of Tintern Abbey, Looking towards the East Window by J. M. W. Turner, 1794

During the height of the Wye Tour's popularity (the first decade of the nineteenth century, there were no fewer than eight to ten "pleasure boats" launching from Ross-on-Wye towards Chepstow each day. These pleasure boats were equipped with drawing tables, at which tourists would either read travel journals (usually Gilpin's Observations...) or sit and rapidly sketch scenes that struck them as especially Picturesque. The boats also featured canopies (to protect travellers from the sun), and crews to steer and row the boats downriver. Such boats could be retained for the price of three guineas per passenger per day. Alternately, a tourist could elect to walk along the banks of the Wye (as William Wordsworth did before writing "Lines Composed a few miles above Tintern Abbey, on Revisiting the Banks of the Wye during a Tour, 13 July 1798"), or, if they were exceptionally rich, take a private carriage.

Each Tour followed the same general itinerary. First, tourists would leave Ross-on-Wye, appreciating the "mazy course and lofty banks". of the river on the way to their next major destination, Goodrich Castle. Gilpin deemed the castle "correctly Picturesque". in its own right, and the crumbling structure, entwined with vines and set on a large hill that loomed over the viewer, "was generally considered to rank as the second grand object of the tour". From Goodrich Castle, tourists would sail past the ironworks at New Weir (sometimes spelled "New Wear"). Tourists of the time (like Thomas Whateley, who reverentially mentioned "a path [for the ironworkers], worn into steps narrow and steep, winding among the precipices" and commented on a "sullen sound that, at stated intervals from the strokes of the great hammers in the forge, deadens the roar of the water-fall") thought of the ironworks as enhancing the Picturesque qualities of the surrounding landscape; "the natural scene itself is awesome, and therefore positively enhanced by the presence of industry". After sailing past New Weir, the boats would next pass under Symond's Yat, a 470-foot-tall (140 m) rock that impressed passers-by with a sense of the Sublime.

At the end of the first day of the Tour, the travellers would arrive at the town of Monmouth, and spend the night in an inn. The following morning, tourists would pass riverside hamlets and Picturesque natural scenery before finally arriving at the Tour's greatest spectacle, Tintern Abbey. There, awestruck seekers of the Picturesque observed the bare columns and walls of what was once a massive structure, overrun with vegetation and decay. Before the Abbey was immortalised by William Wordsworth's poem "Lines composed a few miles above Tintern Abbey..." it was considered to be an impressive, although imperfectly Picturesque, ruin. During the 18th century, the Abbey was purchased by the Duke of Beaufort, who had immediately attempted to "restore" the Abbey. The Duke's restorative efforts, which included hammering bronze letters into the brick floor, introducing plants that compromised the structural integrity of arches and hallways, and other such harmful practices, ultimately did more damage than good to the ruins. Despite the Duke's restorative efforts, Gilpin remained unimpressed with the Abbey, and complained that "though the parts are beautiful, the whole is ill-shaped". Most tourists, however, generally considered Tintern Abbey to be the most important and beautiful location on the Wye Tour. Later tourists were probably familiar with Wordsworth's famous poem "Lines.." and the importance of that piece only increased the aura of the Abbey.

After walking through the ruins of the Abbey, tourists returned to their boats and sailed further down the Wye, noting the cliff "Lover's Leap" and especially the Picturesque plains of Piercefield before arriving at the end of the Tour, the junction of the Rivers Wye and Severn in Chepstow. The ruins of Chepstow Castle were the final spectacle of the Wye Tour. After arriving in Chepstow, Tourists would arrange for transportation back to their respective homes.

== The Wye Tour and the Picturesque ==
The Wye Tour was first popularised by William Gilpin's Observations on the River Wye... (1782), a travel journal, complete with sketches. Gilpin had been encouraged to make the journey by his friend Thomas Gray, who had found the tour to be "a succession of nameless beauties". Gilpin's book did more than encourage British citizens to observe the beauties of the Wye Valley – it marked the first time that Gilpin discussed the Picturesque (originally defined as "that peculiar kind of beauty, which is agreeable in a picture") at length. As a result, the Wye Valley was more or less constantly associated with the Picturesque, and as public awareness and appreciation for the Picturesque increased, so too did the popularity of the Wye Tour.

== Modern exhibitions ==
From May to September 2010, Chepstow Museum held a temporary exhibition, 'The Wye Tour and its Artists', of period art from the Wye Tour. A catalogue and detailed guide was published.

== Bibliography ==
- Andrews, Malcolm (1989). The Search for the Picturesque. Stanford, CA: Stanford University Press.
- Gilpin, William (1782). Observations on the River Wye and Several parts of South Wales, &c., Relative Chiefly to Picturesque Beauty, made in the summer of the year 1770. London: R. Blamire.
- Gilpin, William (1802). An Essay on Prints. London: A. Strahan.
- Mitchell, Julian (2010). The Wye Tour and its Artists. Logaston Press. ISBN 978-1-906663-32-2.
- Moir, Esther (1964). Discovery of Britain: The English Tourists, 1540 to 1840. London: Routledge & K. Paul.
