= Otter Hole =

Cave near Chepstow, Monmouthshire, Wales

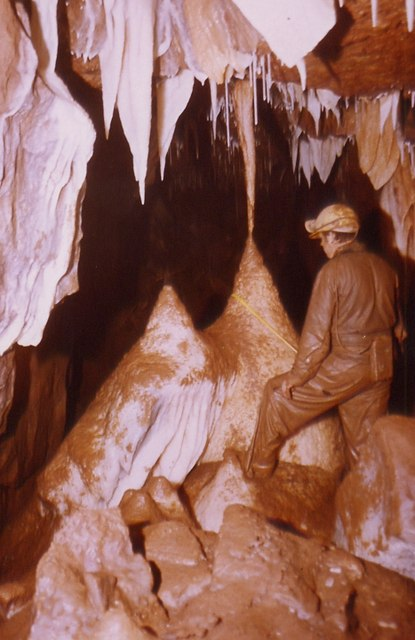
- Inside Otter Hole
- Interactive map of Otter Hole
- Location: St Arvans, Monmouthshire, Wales
- Coordinates: 51°39′39″N 2°41′10″W
- Depth: 60m
- Length: 3.352km
- Geology: Limestone
- Entrances: 1, accessed through tidal sump.
- Access: Gated, with permission and guidance of a warden

Otter Hole is a cave in Britain, known for being well decorated. Located on the Wales–England border just north of Chepstow, the cave runs from the banks of the tidal River Wye under the Chepstow Racecourse and onwards through various chambers, each rich with cave formations. Because of its importance as one of the finest examples of decorated caverns in Europe, access is restricted and is managed by the Royal Forest of Dean Caving Club on behalf of the landowner.

== Description ==
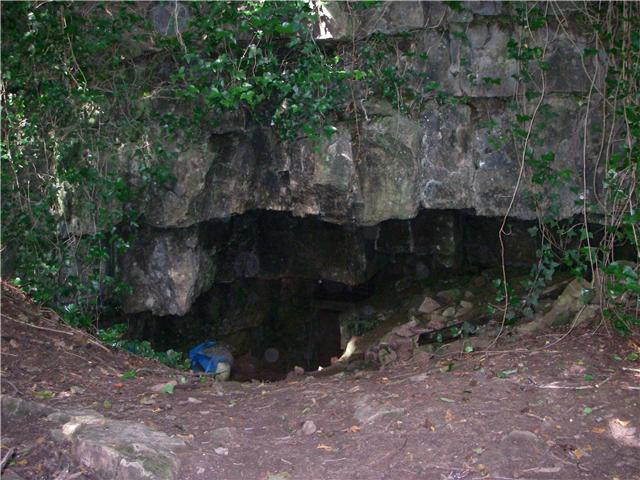
The entrance in 2008

The entrance to the cave is on the banks of the Wye through a gated doorway at the foot of a bluff. This is locked as a precaution against illegal entry to the cave, to protect the rare forms inside the cave and to prevent anyone wandering into the cave and being trapped accidentally as the cave floods with the tide.

After a short crawl with few squeezes the passage opens out to a 'beach' where the tidal sump blocks access. At low tide this sump drains quickly and noisily, becoming passable as a 'duck' beneath a 'figure 8' double opening. The frequency of the tidal sump means that two trips are possible: a 'between tide trip' lasting around 6 hours will enter just after the sump drains and leave just before it fills, or the 'overtide trip' the sump is passed just before closing giving between 9 and 15 hours' caving time.

Continuing past the sump, a fairly linear route leads along the active streamway, eventually reaching a pool in which many choose to remove some of the thick estuarine mud that could otherwise sully the delicate formations. Beyond a few boulder chokes are many well-decorated chambers and eventually the Hall of 30. This is the largest of the chambers, filled with many monumental stalagmites in a range of colours from pure white, through oranges and yellows, to pure black. The range of colours is caused by the variety of minerals seeping through the bedrock and being deposited in the formations. Whites are the natural calcium carbonate forms, while elements such as arsenic create the black forms.

The formations continue beyond the Hall of 30 until the passage changes character once more at the junction of Tunnels Left and Right. Camp is generally considered to be the far back of the cave, and contains decorations such as straws, helictites and pom poms. The return journey takes you back through the Hall of 30 and along the streamway towards the sump.

== Conservation ==
Because of the unique collection of formations at Otter Hole, access is limited, with bookings for trips taken well in advance through the Otter Hole Secretary. Those taking part in trips may be asked to participate in some of the conservation work that is carried out, such as cleaning the stals and drapes, laying tape or simply cleaning up any rubbish found. All trips are run with wardens from the Royal Forest of Dean Caving Club, who are there to both guide and control impact on the area.

The cave is a Site of Special Scientific Interest (SSSI), GCR number 550.
