= Adam Alexander (horticulturalist) =

British horticulturalist, author

Adam Alexander is a British horticulturalist, author, and filmmaker. He is known as the Seed Detective.

== Biography ==
Alexander's first business was market gardening on part of his parents' farm. This business failed and he went into film and television production.

Alexander is an advocate and practitioner of seed saving. He is a member of the British Seed Guardian project who work to collect and save rare seeds. Alexander is critical of the impact that monocultures have on agriculture and the larger environment.

He is known as the Seed Detective and has traveled around the world collecting rare seeds.

== Personal life ==
Alexander lives in eastern Wales. His 3.5 acre farm is located near Chepstow. On his farm he grows approximately 100 varieties of vegetables each year.

== Books ==
=== The Seed Detective ===
The Seed Detective is a book which is largely autobiographical in which Alexander examines the history of some of the vegetables he has encountered over the years. It was recommended by the Slow Food Foundation. The Seed Detective was published in September 2022.
