= Pembroke Limestone Group =

- Stratigraphic range: Lower Carboniferous
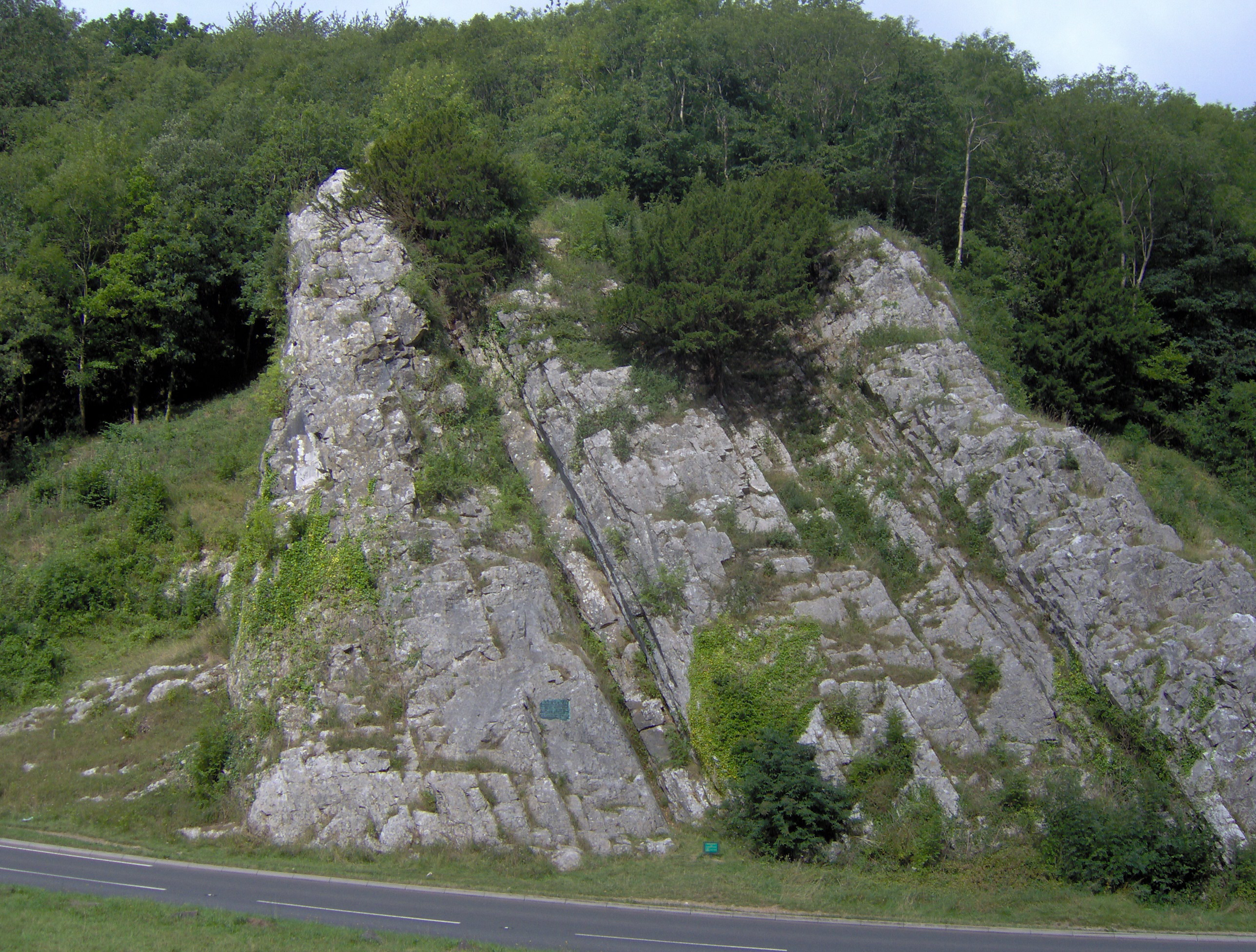
- Steeply dipping oolitic limestone of the Burrington Oolite Subgroup in Burrington Combe
- Type: Group
- Unit of: Carboniferous Limestone Supergroup
- Sub-units: Black Rock Limestone Subgroup, Burrington Oolite Subgroup
- Underlies: Marros Group
- Overlies: Avon Group
- Thickness: Up to 1025 m

Lithology
- Primary: Limestone
- Other: Mudstone, sandstone

Location
- Region: South Wales, Somerset

Type section
- Named for: Pembroke

The Pembroke Limestone Group is a stratigraphic unit of Courceyan to Brigantian age (Early Carboniferous) found in southern Wales and northern Somerset. It forms part of the Carboniferous Limestone Supergroup. These carbonate rocks developed in platform and ramp environments and are up to 1025m thick in places.

The make-up of the Group varies from one part of the basin to another but in south Pembrokeshire it comprises the following formations:

- Oystermouth Formation
- Oxwich Head Limestone Formation
- Stackpole Limestone Formation
- Pen-y-Holt Limestone Formation
- Hobbyhorse Bay Limestone Formation
- Linney Head Formation
- Berry Slade Limestone Formation
- Black Rock Limestone Subgroup

In the Tenby, Gower and Vale of Glamorgan areas, the Stackpole Formation is replaced by the Hunt's Bay Oolite Subgroup which consists of a lower/earlier Cornelly Oolite Formation and an upper/later Stormy Limestone Formation. Likewise the Linney Head to Pen-y-Holt sequence is replaced by a tripartite sequence with the Gully Oolite at its base, unconformably overlain by the Caswell Bay Mudstone Formation and topped with the High Tor Limestone Formation. The Black Rock Limestone is divided into the lower Barry Harbour Limestone Formation succeeded by the Brofiscin Oolite Formation and topped off with the Friars Point Limestone Formation in the Vale of Glamorgan and Newport areas.

The 'North Crop' i.e. the limestone succession exposed to the north of the South Wales Coalfield displays a different sequence and rather more of the succession is absent either through erosion or non-deposition. The Dowlais Limestone Formation is present in place of the Hunt's Bay Oolite, whilst within the Oxwich Head Limestone, the Penderyn Oolite and Honeycombed Sandstones are recognised as members.

To the east of the Severn, the Pembroke Limestone within the English part of the basin is initiated by an undivided Black Rock Subgroup, overlain except in the Mendip Hills by the Gully Oolite once again. In the Avon Gorge, the Clifton Down Mudstone Formation is succeeded by the Clifton Down Limestone Formation then by the Oxwich Head Limestone Formation and finally the Upper Cromhall Sandstone. The Gully Oolite, the mudstone and the sandstone are not present in the Mendips.

The Oystermouth Formation was formerly known as the Upper Limestone Shales, Rottenstone Beds or Oystermouth Beds. These argillaceous limestones and mudstones are sometimes weathered at outcrop to rottenstone and clay.

== See also ==
- List of types of limestone
