= George Hotel =

George Hotel or The George Hotel may refer to:

== Australia ==
- George Hotel, Sydney

== Isle of Man ==
- The George Hotel, The Parade, Castletown, Isle of Man; an Isle of Man registered building

== Ukraine ==
- Hotel George (Lviv)

== United Kingdom ==
- George Hotel, Chepstow, Wales
- The George Hotel, Crawley, England
- The George Hotel, Edinburgh, Scotland; also known as The Principal Edinburgh George Street
- George Hotel, Huddersfield, England; notable for being the birthplace of rugby league football
- George Hotel, Kilmarnock, Scotland
- The George Hotel, Reading, England
- George Hotel, Stamford, England; historic coaching inn
- George Hotel, Swaffham, England

== United States ==
- George Hotel (Kanosh, Utah); listed on the National Register of Historic Places

== See also ==
- Royal George Hotel (disambiguation)
- George Washington Hotel (disambiguation)
