= Chepstow Town Gate =

Gateway in Chepstow, Monmouthshire, Wales

Town Gate
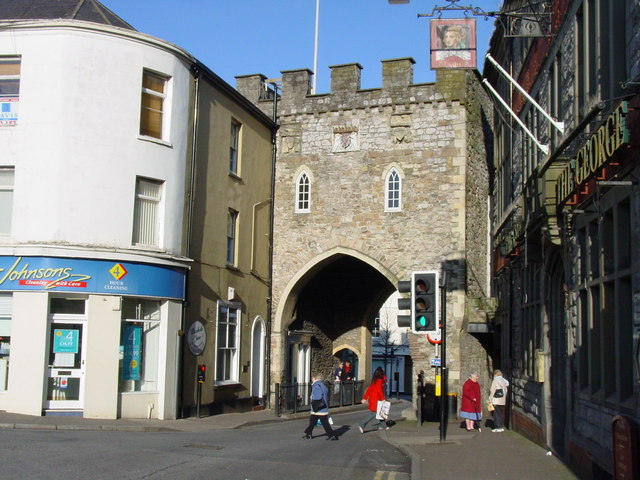
- The Town Gate from the west, with the George Hotel on the right (2006)
- Interactive map of the Town Gate area

General information
- Location: Chepstow, Wales
- Coordinates: 51.640966°N 2.676558°W
- Completed: c.1278 Rebuilt 1524
- Renovated: 1985-86

Design and construction
- Designations: Grade I listed

The Town Gate at Chepstow, Monmouthshire, Wales, known locally as the Town Arch, was historically the only landward entrance to the town through the Port Wall, and a point where tolls for those resorting to the town and its market were collected. It was originally built, with the wall, in the late thirteenth century. The current archway mainly dates from the sixteenth century, but has been restored and partly rebuilt on several occasions. It is located at the western end of the town's High Street, and is a Grade I listed building.

== History ==
After the Norman conquest of England and parts of south Wales, Chepstow developed as an important port and trading centre within the Marcher Lordship of Striguil. In 1270 the lordship came under the control of Roger Bigod, 5th Earl of Norfolk, after the death of his uncle. Bigod undertook a substantial building programme within and around Chepstow, including, at the Castle, a new range of buildings for accommodation for himself and his family, and a massive new defensive tower (now known as "Marten's Tower"); and also, a few miles to the north, the rebuilding of Tintern Abbey. He was also responsible for the building of the Port Wall, usually dated at 1274–78, and the Town Gate; and, in 1294, for granting to his close associate, John ap Adam of Sedbury, the right to hold a regular market at Chepstow. The Port Wall and Town Gate together ensured that only those paying tolls to the lord could attend the market; and had the additional purpose of keeping out undesirable elements, including the occasionally hostile Welsh people living in the countryside to the west of the town.

The Town Gate building is square in plan, with battlements on top, and originally could be blocked with a portcullis, no longer extant. It is hemmed in by buildings on all sides, including, to the east, the Gate House and, to the west, the George Hotel. On the western side of the Gate are two worn and illegible heraldic angels, probably dating from a rebuilding of the gate by Charles Somerset, 1st Earl of Worcester, in 1524. The Earl was responsible for granting a charter to the town, which was described at the time as "fallen into great ruin, indigence and decay", and allowed the town's bailiffs to use the room above the archway as a prison. The Gate was recorded as the "New Gate" in 1687, suggesting that an earlier gateway may have existed in the area.

Tolls were collected at the Gate on animals and goods taken into the market place, and by people who bought livestock at the town's fairs. In 1648, the Gate was the scene of a skirmish between the town's Royalist defenders and troops led by Oliver Cromwell, who gained entry to the town and besieged and won the Castle. In 1756, country people and colliers from the nearby Forest of Dean raided the town, and had to be driven off by guns mounted on the Town Gate and on the Wye Bridge. Tolls continued to be collected until the death of the last "Keeper of the Gate" in 1874.

The Gate was part of the properties of the Dukes of Beaufort after they inherited the lordship. In 1899, the 9th Duke put the building up for sale but, at the auction, C.W. Whalley, the Chairman of the Town Council, persuaded his representatives that the building be donated to the town. A plaque attached to the building records the Town Council's thanks to the Duke. The tiled pedestrian pathway on the southern side of the arch was cut through the Gate House and opened in 1928. The room over the archway was used in later centuries as a storeroom, workshop and office, before becoming the first home of the town's museum in 1949. A full restoration of the building took place in 1985–86, when an internal doorway apparently dating to the thirteenth century was discovered. A plaque to mark the building's restoration, designed and decorated by local artist Keith Underwood in the style of the eroded coats of arms to either side of it, was unveiled in April 1988 by the 11th Duke of Beaufort.

The Town Gate was given Grade I Listed Building status on 12 June 1950. Road access through the single carriageway arch is controlled by traffic lights in three directions: east, north and west. The Gate was closed to road traffic for over two years during the COVID pandemic, between June 2020 and August 2022.

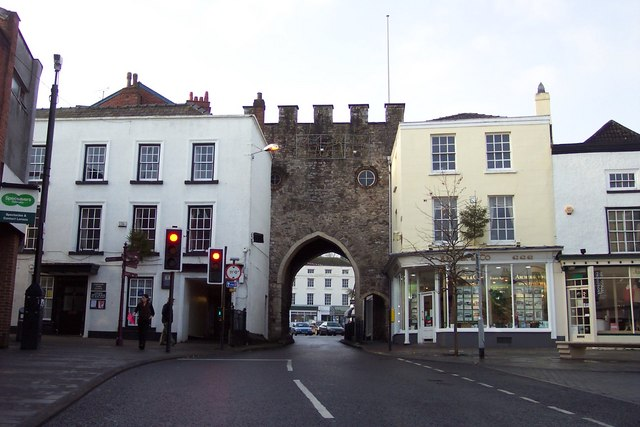
The Town Gate from the east, showing the Gate House on the left

In December 2024, the current Duke of Beaufort visited Chepstow to mark the 500th anniversary of the town's Charter and rebuilding of the Arch in 1524.

== Adjoining buildings ==
The Gate House adjoining the Town Gate was rebuilt in 1609 for Margaret Cleyton, a wealthy widow and benefactor; the date is recorded above its doorway. Her elaborate tomb is in St Mary's Church. The building was later used as a brewery, farmhouse, surgery, and bank, before being presented to the town in 1919 by J.H. Silley, an engineer who was influential in bringing the National Shipyard No.1 to the town in the First World War. It then became the offices of Chepstow Urban District Council, and is now used by the Town Council and Citizens' Advice Bureau.

On the outer side of the Town Gate, the George Hotel was originally built on this site by Margaret Cleyton in about 1620. It later became one of the town's main coaching inns. The building was completely destroyed by fire in May 1896, but was rebuilt and reopened in 1899. The area outside the Gate was at one time where those unwilling to pay the lord's dues did their trading, and a stone cross known locally as "Robin Hood's Cross" existed outside the George until it was dismantled in 1759. Trading took place in the streets here until a new livestock market was built elsewhere in the town in 1893.
