= National Shipyard =

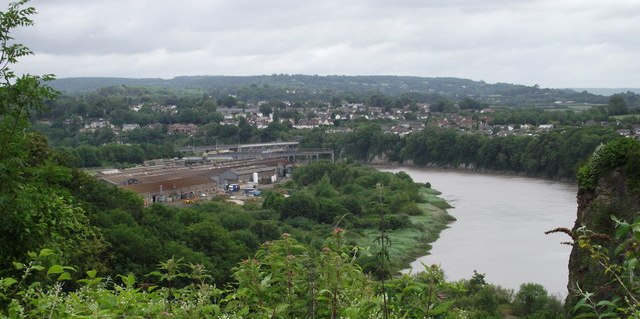
View taken in 2011 towards the site of National Shipyard No.1 at Chepstow. The shipyard was in the area covered by the factory buildings and overgrown slipways in the centre of the photograph.

The National Shipyards, in the United Kingdom, were an initiative to expand merchant ship production during the First World War, proposed and partially completed by the coalition government led by David Lloyd George.

Three shipyards were proposed: National Shipyard No.1 at Chepstow; National Shipyard No.2 at Beachley; and National Shipyard No.3 at Portbury. All were located within 12 miles (19 km) of each other, on the River Wye and the Severn estuary. The initiative to establish the shipyards in 1917 followed heavy losses of Allied merchant ships, principally through German U-boat attacks, but in the event only one ship was completed before the end of the war, and the exercise was heavily criticised as a waste of money.

== The initiative ==
During the First World War Britain was exposed to a war on trade, with large numbers of British merchant ships being destroyed by German U-boat attacks in the Atlantic Ocean. During the last few months of 1916 these losses amounted to some 180 ships per month (over 300,000 GRT), while Britain's capacity to replace them was barely a third of that. The counter-measures were limited and largely ineffectual, and the Government resolved to build more cargo ships quickly so as to help maintain supply routes. In May 1917, Sir Eric Geddes was appointed as First Lord of the Admiralty, and later that year the War Cabinet, acting under the Defence of the Realm Act 1914, agreed to establish several National Shipyards. These were to be built so as to construct large numbers of "standard" cargo ships as rapidly as possible. Three shipyards were proposed to be built at Chepstow, Beachley and Portbury, on the rivers Wye and Severn, with a total of 41 slipways. The intention was to develop 8 berths at Chepstow, 18 at Beachley, 8 at Portbury, and a further 7 at Chepstow through taking over the adjacent Finch's Yard.

It was intended to develop the yards for the construction of prefabricated ships of the "N" design. Parts would be manufactured in other parts of the country, and moved to the shipyards by rail for assembly. The first ships were scheduled to be launched in October 1918. The shipyards themselves were to be built by Royal Engineers and German prisoners of war, with the ships being assembled by civilian labour. In March 1918 Geddes stated that the monthly output of British shipbuilding yards would have to be nearly doubled before the monthly rate of sinking was made good.

== National Shipyard No.1, Chepstow ==
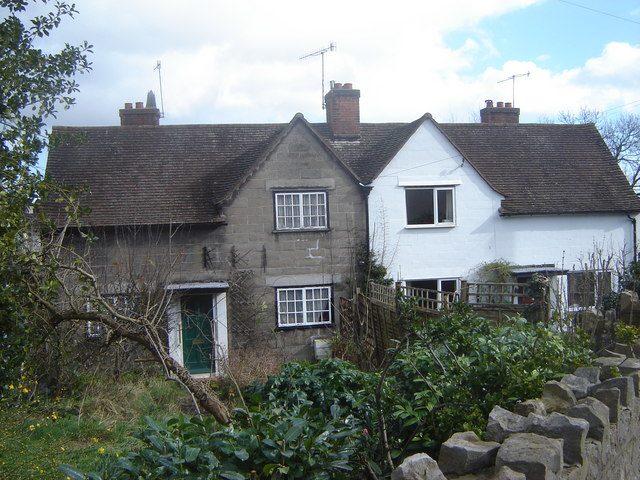
Houses built for National Shipyard staff at Hardwick "Garden City", Chepstow: the one on the left retains the original windows and lack of rendering

One of the National Shipyards, at Chepstow in Monmouthshire, was developed by expanding an existing shipyard on land adjoining the River Wye, immediately south of the town's railway bridge. This had been established in 1916 by the Standard Shipbuilding Company, formed by a group including Lord Inchcape and Chepstow-based marine engineer John Henry Silley (1872–1941). Its aim was to mass-produce ships to a "standard" design, and began laying down eight slipways to build ships of up to 600 feet (180 m) in length and of up to 300 tons. As part of the shipyard development, a section of the town's 13th century Port Wall was demolished to make way for the shipyard and associated railway sidings.

Over 6,000 skilled workers came to the Chepstow area from other shipbuilding areas, including Tyneside and Clydeside, and new housing was provided at three new "garden suburbs": 200 houses at Hardwick, Chepstow (now known as "Garden City"); 223 at Bulwark; and, for those working at Beachley, 342 at Pennsylvania, Sedbury. The building of the shipyards, and the manufacture of the concrete blocks used to build the houses, was undertaken in part by prisoners of war, and in part by the Royal Engineers. Additional temporary housing was provided in huts, and facilities were provided including a new hospital at Chepstow. However, the Government decided to take over the Standard Shipbuilding Company in August 1917, and appointed its own managers. The effect of this was to slow progress further. Lord Inchcape and J. H. Silley opposed nationalisation, stating that they had found the site, acquired foreshore rights, and arranged to provide housing for the workers, but the Government argued that the Standard Shipbuilding Company had been acting too slowly in increasing shipbuilding capacity.

Sections of the first ship arrived at Chepstow in April 1918, but progress was slow and the organisation of the project was criticised, both by existing shipyards and by trade unions who were excluded from the initiative and objected to the use of military labour. In August 1918, the Chepstow shipyard took over the adjoining Finch's Works immediately to the north of the site, and the following month the War Forest (a C-Class Standard Ship, which remained in use under various names until as Grado she was torpedoed and sunk in 1943), launched from the Finch's site, became the first standard ship to be launched from any of the National Shipyards. However, by the end of the war in November 1918, no prefabricated ships had been completed.

== National Shipyard No.2, Beachley ==
At Beachley in Gloucestershire, downstream of Chepstow and on the opposite bank of the Wye, construction of National Shipyard No.2 did not begin until 1917, making use of prisoners of war. These were housed in camps at Beachley, from where all villagers had previously been evicted with 11 days notice, under the Defence of the Realm Act, and at Sedbury. A railway spur was built from the main line at Tutshill, and a new power station, slipways, assembly hangars and houses were built, at a cost of over £2 million. However, the work was unfinished at the end of the war, and the only ship started at the site, the War Odyssey, was never completed.

== National Shipyard No.3, Portbury ==
Portbury shipyard, with associated rail links, was located between Portishead in Somerset and the mouth of the River Avon, on the site which later became Royal Portbury Dock. The shipyard was still being constructed at the end of the First World War.

== Criticism and costs ==
By July 1918, there was open criticism of the National Shipyards proposals in the House of Commons. The Liberal M.P. Gerald France stated that the issue had "become not a war emergency... but a speculative adventure", and Sir Hamar Greenwood described the initiative as a "scandal". Greenwood went on:

"What really is a serious matter is that the time and energy of the War Cabinet, which should think of nothing but this awful War, where men are slaughtered daily, have been wasted by innumerable deputations, by arguments for and against, and by the pursuit of this phantom of a great national shipyard on the mud flats of a river in the West of England. Up to the present not a ship has been produced, and there is no sign of a ship being produced for years. I urge the Government, however foolish it has been, to be strong enough now to stop this blunder."

The War ended in November 1918. The total cost to the Government of the work at Chepstow and Beachley was announced in 1919 to have been £6,120,000: including £162,000 to purchase the Finch's yard, £964,000 for the No.1 Shipyard, £1,933,000 for the No.2 Shipyard, £863,000 to build houses and camps, and £109,000 for the new Mount Pleasant Hospital.

== Later uses ==
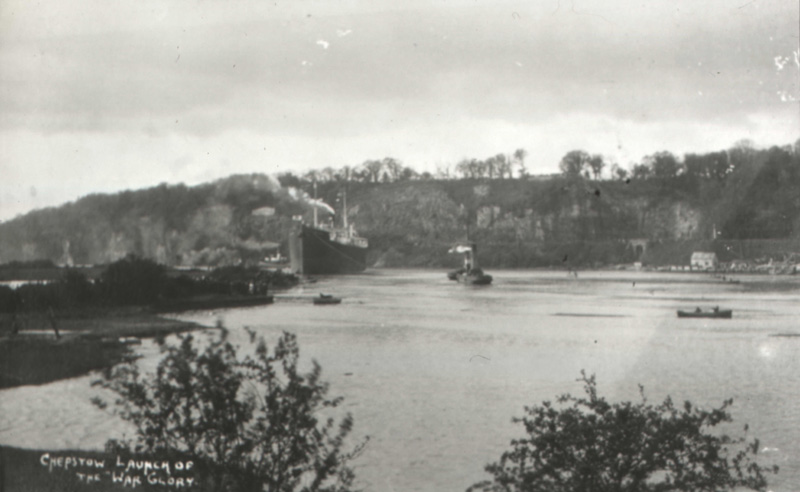
The launch of the "War Glory" in 1920. Photo from Monmouth Museum

After the end of the First World War, the Chepstow shipyard was taken over briefly by the Monmouthshire Shipbuilding Company. The peak year for its output was 1920, when eight ships, totalling 40,510 tons, were launched. The largest ship launched from the yard was the War Glory, of 6,543 tons, launched on 21 April 1920. It later became the Monte Pasubio, and was wrecked off the coast of Argentina in 1924.

In 1924 the site was bought by the Fairfield Shipbuilding and Engineering Company, based in Glasgow. The works mainly produced bridges and other heavy engineering structures during and after the Second World War. After the Fairfield company went bankrupt in 1966, the site was taken over by Mabey. In 2011, the site was proposed by Monmouthshire County Council for redevelopment for housing and offices, with the Mabey Bridge engineering works moving to a new site adjoining the M48 motorway. More detailed proposals for the development of the site were published in September 2014, and proposals to develop the site for housing were approved in 2019. As part of the housing development, known as the Brunel Quarter, the site of the former No.4 slipway was opened as a public open space in October 2022.

The Beachley site remained in Government ownership, and in 1924 part was taken over for the Boys Technical College, later the Army Apprentices College and now Beachley Barracks, the base of the 1st Battalion, The Rifles. In November 2016 the Ministry of Defence announced that the site would close in 2027. Remains of the National Shipyard, including embankments, slipways, sheds, accommodation blocks and a network of railway lines and sidings, can still be detected from aerial photographs.
