= George Hotel, Chepstow =

Public house in Chepstow, Wales

George Hotel
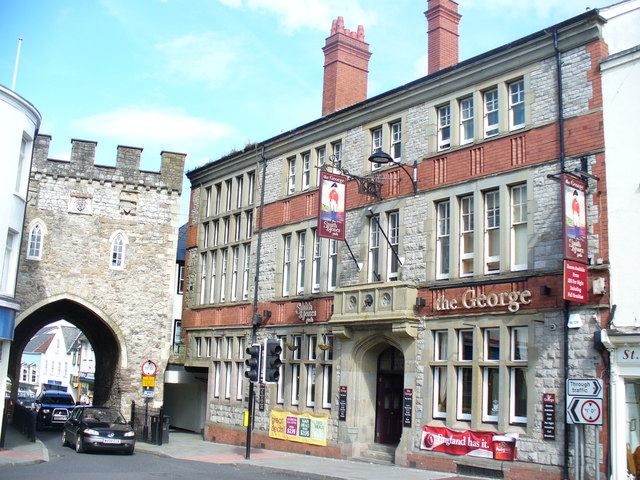
- The George in 2009

- Location in Monmouthshire

General information
- Location: Chepstow, Monmouthshire, Wales
- Coordinates: 51°38′28″N 2°40′40″W

Other information
- Number of rooms: 11

The George Hotel, formerly The George Inn, is a public house and hotel in Chepstow, Monmouthshire, Wales. It is located next to the Chepstow Town Gate at the foot of Moor Street, and was once an important coaching inn. Although there has been an inn on the site since 1620, the current building dates from 1899.

== History ==
=== The original inn ===
The George was established in about 1620 by Margaret Cleyton, the owner of the adjoining Gate House and many other properties in the area. It was first recorded in 1624, with the landlord named as William Jones. The George and the Gate House are positioned on either side of the town wall, and may have been linked by tunnels. In 1627 Mrs Cleyton bequeathed the inn to her daughter and son-in-law, Elinor and James Flower. During the English Civil War, several military officers staying at the inn were killed in their rooms by intruders in separate incidents.

In later centuries the George became a centre of Chepstow's social and community life, with inquests and petty sessions sometimes being held there. In the late eighteenth and early nineteenth centuries, it became one of Chepstow's main coaching inns and a popular base for tourists on the "Wye Tour". Coaches left the George regularly for Bath, Brecon and Ross-on-Wye in 1835. In 1842, William Makepeace Thackeray called it "one of the cleanest, neatest, cheerfulest, fresh-salmon-givingest Inns to be found anywhere". The George advertised itself in 1859 as catering for 'Families, Tourists, and Commercial Gentlemen'. It became a centre for local auctions, and for hustings during local elections, as well as being used by travelling dentists. Many local organizations, such as the Chepstow Cricket Club, Chepstow Farmers' Club, and Chepstow Hunt Steeplechase Committee, held their meetings and functions at the inn in the later nineteenth century, as did the independent freeholders of the county of Huntingdon, Cotteswold Naturalists' Field Club, and the Institute of British Foundrymen. The property itself paid a small annual tithe to the manor of Porthcasseg near Tintern.

The inn was sold by auction in 1882, when it was described as comprising:

"Bar, Coffee Room, Commercial Room, Large Dining and Market Rooms, 3 private sitting rooms, Billiards Room, 11 Bedrooms, servants Apartments, Kitchens, Pantry, Laundry, and other offices, and good cellarage. There is also a large and productive garden (about 1/2 acre), and a very convenient detached yard, with extensive stabling. Hay and Corn Lofts, coach houses, Saddle and Harness Rooms &c. adjoining... water and gas is laid on to the House and stables."

=== Fire and rebuilding ===
In May 1896, the daughter of the landlord, Joseph Collins, discovered a fire in the building, apparently originating in a room behind the bar. The occupants escaped without injury, but the main town water supply had been interfered with and turned off, and the remaining supplies were inadequate for the local Volunteer Fire Brigade to douse the flames. Within a few hours, the entire building had been gutted. The stables and yards, which were located across the road from the hotel itself, fronting onto Welsh Street, were undamaged.

The building's owner, Mrs Peel, sold the remaining salvageable effects, and the property itself was sold in August 1896. The site of the hotel was purchased by William Watkins of Newport, and the stables were sold separately to William Woodgate. Rebuilding of the hotel was delayed by Watkins' death in 1897, but was completed in 1899 by the Cardiff architects Veall and Sant, with a frontage described by architectural historian John Newman as "stark neo-Tudor". During the rebuilding work, tunnels leading away from the hotel, apparently towards the castle and the river, were discovered and filled in.

=== Later uses ===
The hotel's role in the town diminished during the twentieth century, but it remained "a better class small hotel". It became a Trust House hotel (later part of Trust House Forte) in the 1930s. In November 1983 it was put up for public auction, and as of 1997, it was a 3-star hotel with 11 bedrooms.
