= 26th Regiment Royal Artillery =

British Army artillery regiment

- Active: 1947 to present
- Allegiance: United Kingdom
- Branch: British Army
- Role: Divisional Fires Artillery
- Size: 5 Batteries; 737 personnel
- Part of: 3rd Deep Reconnaissance Strike Brigade
- Garrison/HQ: Purvis Lines, Larkhill Garrison
- Nickname: The West Midland Gunners
- Equipment: M270 Multiple Launch Rocket System

26th Regiment Royal Artillery is a regiment of the Royal Artillery in the British Army. The regiment is equipped with MLRS and is 3rd (United Kingdom) Division's divisional fires regiment.

== History ==
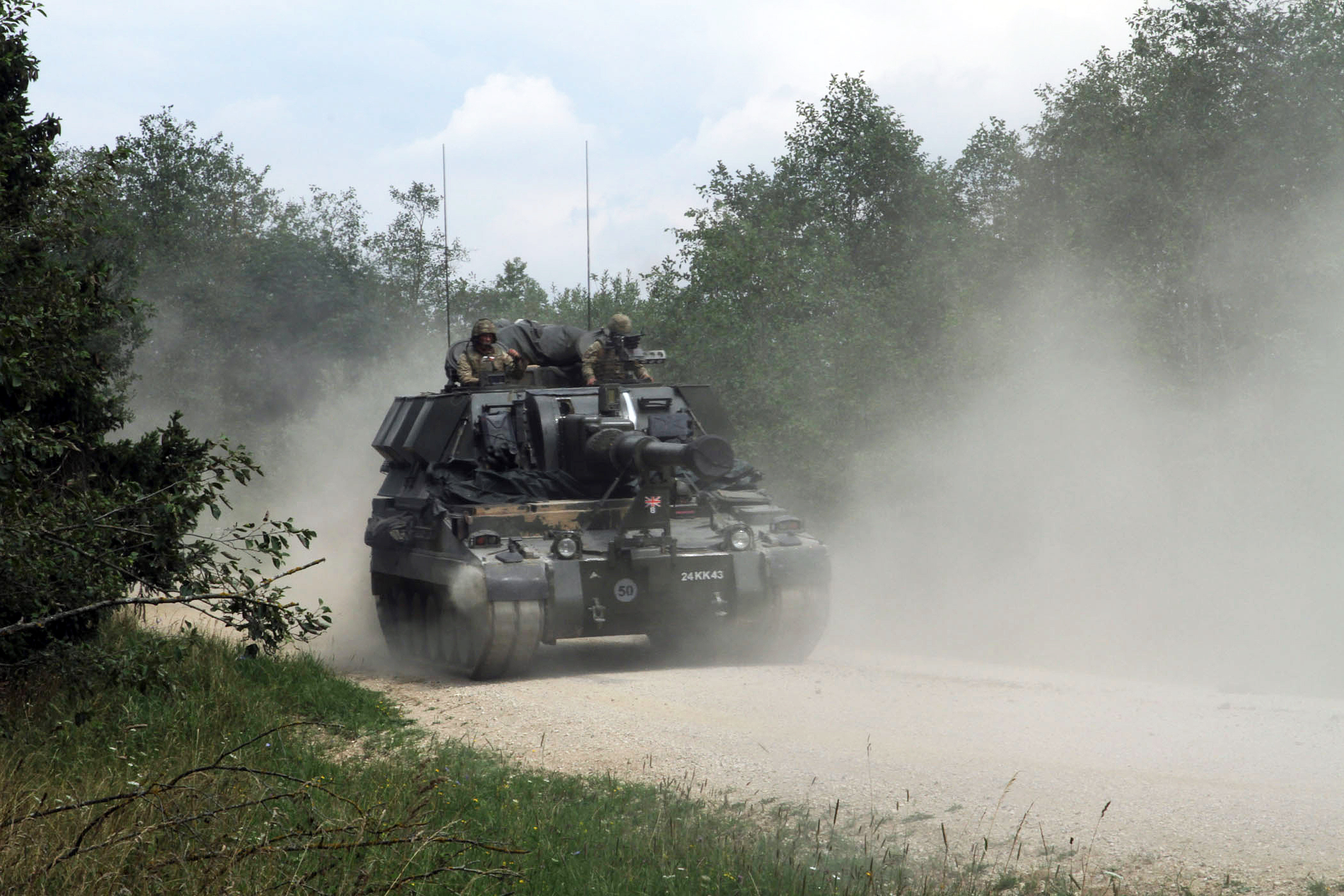
An AS90 of 26th Regiment conducts live-fire exercise at Grafenwoehr, Germany, 2014

The regiment was formed from 4th Field Regiment RA in 1947. It saw action in Malaya later that year and deployed to Libya in 1951. It was renamed 26th Airportable Regiment RA in 1962 and re-equipped with 105mm Pack Howitzers. In 1963, it was renamed 26th Medium Regiment RA and re-equipped with 5.5" Howitzers and then deployed to Cyprus. It moved to Hohne in 1965 and was renamed 26th Field Regiment RA when it re-equipped with the Abbot self propelled gun.

In the 1970s, it saw tours in Northern Ireland during the Troubles and during the 1980s it was based at Baker Barracks with a tour of Belize in 1987 followed by Northern Ireland in 1990. The Regiment was moved out to Mansergh Barracks, Gütersloh, Germany and was equipped once again with the Abbot. At the onset of the Kuwait invasion by Iraq, the Regiment took charge of M109 howitzer artillery and was deployed as part of Operation Granby with 1st Armored Division during the 1991 gulf war. On return to Mansergh Barracks, the Regiment again had tours of Northern Ireland before changing roles once more and being issued AS90 in 1994. The regiment was deployed to Bosnia and Herzegovina the following year. Units went to Kosovo in 2000, took part in the 2003 invasion of Iraq and was deployed to Afghanistan under Operation Herrick 9 in 2008. Most recently, 16 (Sandham's Company) Battery deployed on Operation CABRIT 1, NATO's Enhanced Forward Presence in Estonia, in March 2017. Under Army 2020 Refine, the regiment will be a divisional fire regiment.

On 14 May 2019, the regiment's last group of members left Mansergh Barracks in Germany. The regiment has, of October 2019, fully been based in Purvis Lines in Larkhill. These barracks are brand new and were designed especially for the regiment. During their farewell parade, the regiment received the ceremonial ribbon, which is Germany's most prestigious award.

In 2024, the MOD reached a settlement with 26th Regiment Royal Artillery corporal, Kerry-Ann Knight for racist and sexist abuse she suffered during her 12 years in the British Army and as a member of the regiment.

== Batteries ==
The batteries are as follows:

- 55 (The Residency) Battery Royal Artillery — Headquarters Battery
- 132 Battery (The Bengal Rocket Troop) Royal Artillery
- 159 (Colenso) Battery Royal Artillery
- 176 (Abu Klea) Battery Royal Artillery

Two batteries are equipped with M270A2 MLRS systems (132 Battery and 176 Battery), while 159 Battery is equipped developing the army’s OWE capability.

== 26th Regiment Royal Artillery Association ==
In 1993, the association was formed to enable serving and ex serving members of the regiment to meet bi-annually. Since then, the association has grown in membership and currently has approximately 500 full members. The association's website is intended to reach people in all parts of the world that either serve or have served in 26th Regiment Royal Artillery, whatever their cap badge might have been.
