= Kerry-Ann Knight =

British soldier

- Military career
- Allegiance: United Kingdom
- Service years: 12 years
- Rank: Corporal
- Units: 26 Regiment Royal Artillery; Army Foundation College
- Known for: British military recruitment Victim of racial discrimination

Kerry-Ann Knight is a former British soldier and Black British woman who served for 12 years in the British Army.

She is most notable for her face being featured on British military recruitment advertisements across the United Kingdom in an attempt to attract more women and ethnic minorities into the British military. She was described by the BBC as a "poster girl" for the British Army, and the Guardian described her as the "face of British army recruitment."

After 12 years in the British Army she left the military after suffering from sustained racial and sexist discrimination which was widely covered in British media.

== Military service ==
During her military career, Knight served in Germany with the 26th Regiment Royal Artillery, where she was the only Black woman in her entire regiment. She also earned the rank of Corporal, and in 2021 she became an instructor at the Army Foundation College.

In 2019, Knight became the face of a British military recruitment posted titled "Me Me Me Millennials. Your Army Needs You and Your Self Belief."

=== Racial and sexist discrimination ===
During her time in the military, Knight claimed she became the victim of bullying and sustained sexist and racial discrimination which Knight began to secretly record. This included fellow soldiers allegedly making watermelon stereotypes towards her, threatened to hotbox, made jokes about tarring and feathering her, and repeatedly called her a "black bitch". Knight also claimed some of her fellow soldiers professed support for racist organisations such as the Ku Klux Klan, Britain First, and the English Defence League.

During her training, Knight was reprimanded by a senior soldier for the style she wore her braids and told "this isn't the ghetto". In 2013 Knight was assaulted by a senior colleague in an attack that was suspected to have been racially motivated. While stationed in Germany she was told to avoid a corridor because her fellow soldiers had displayed swastikas and Confederate flags. While working in the Army Foundation college, fellow soldiers stacked dirty items and boxes on her desk and loudly played Django Unchained when she was nearby, and the instructors posted photos of penises and Adolf Hitler on the professional WhatsApp group which she was a part of. She also claimed male soldiers threatening to lynch her.

When Knight brought evidence of the abuse to her superiors, she was removed from her role under the guise of protecting her mental health.

== Legal fight and settlement ==
In 2022 Knight sought legal advice with help from the Centre for Military Justice and the Equality and Human Rights Commission (EHRC).

In a statement from Knight's lawyer:

“For the army, it was not the racists that needed to be dealt with it, it was Kerry-Ann, because she’d had the audacity to complain about racism and misogyny. It is all dreadfully familiar and shows again that, in the British army, it’s worse to accuse someone of racism than it is to be racist.”

Knight won a substantial settlement with the Ministry of Defence in 2024 and the Army made a public apology.

Knight was praised by the Baroness Baroness Kishwer Falkner of the Equality and Human Rights Commission, calling Knight a "an inspiration to young soldiers".
