= Association of Harrogate Apprentices =

English organisation

Lapel Badge – King's Crown

The Association of Harrogate Apprentices, whose spiritual home is at Harrogate in England, exists to re-unite people in any way associated with the Army Apprentices School, Harrogate (AAS Harrogate), which was renamed the Army Apprentices College, Harrogate (AAC Harrogate) in 1965. This includes people such as ex Apprentice Tradesmen (A/Ts), Permanent Staff Members, ex NAAFI employees, Civilian Instructors etc. who served or worked on the establishment itself in such as the YMCA or Salvation Army canteens.

== General ==
This Army site has been located in Penny Pot Lane, just outside Harrogate, from before the Second World War until its closure in 1996. Originally built in 1939, mostly as wooden huts, the Uniacke Barracks of the site has since been reprieved and presently accommodates the young men and women who train at the Army Foundation College there.

== History ==
The first British military unit known to occupy the site on Penny Pot Lane was the 9th Field Training Regiment, Royal Artillery. They apparently used to fire their guns on the moors near Blubberhouses. They were disbanded in 1943. The next known use was by 116th General Hospital of the United States Army, from 28 July 1944 to 11 May 1945, for the purpose of clearing war casualties.

The Army Apprentices School was established there (probably in both Uniacke and Hildebrande barracks) in 1947. Uniacke barracks was named after Lieutenant General Sir Herbert Uniacke KCB KCMG, who was an artillery officer. He was born in 1866 and died in 1934. Hildebrand barracks was named after Brigadier General Arthur Blois Ross Hildebrand CB CMG DSO. He was a signals officer who was born in 1870 and died in 1937. (Today's rank of brigadier was actually titled brigadier general in those times.)

== Popular culture ==
There is a local legend as to how/why the name 'Penny Pot' for the camp originally came about. The camp is sited upon Penny Pot Lane and folklore has it that in the First World War, when it was a tented camp, soldiers used to march westwards up the road out of camp to purchase ale at the local farm for "a penny a pot".

The name 'Penny Pot' could be associated with the name of a house. In the 18th–19th centuries there was a house on Penny Pot Lane called Penny Pot House and it was the home of the Burnell family of Fewston. Martin Burnell (1708–1776) died at Penny Pot House in February 1776. His older brother John Burnell (1705–1790) is noted as being the Lord Mayor of London in 1787–1788.
