= Army Foundation College recruit abuse investigation 2014–2018 =

British Army recruit abuse investigation

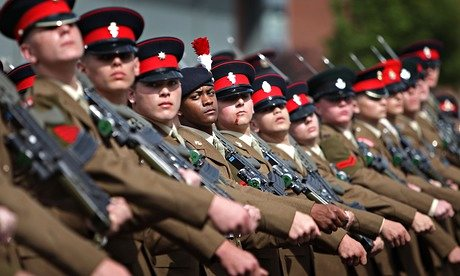
Recruits at the Army Foundation College, Yorkshire, UK.

The Army Foundation College recruit abuse investigation 2014–2018 investigated allegations by a group of 17-year-old British army recruits that 17 instructors had maltreated them during their training over nine days in June 2014. It was reported as the British army's largest ever investigation of abuse. Among the allegations were that the instructors assaulted recruits, smeared cattle dung into their mouths, and held their heads under water. The accused were initially charged with 40 counts of battery, actual bodily harm, and other offences; all denied the charges made against them.

By the time of the preliminary hearing on 21 September 2017, charges against seven of the accused had been dropped. The remaining ten accused were tried at court martial, beginning 12 February 2018. The hearing was expected to last four weeks but soon collapsed after the judge ruled that a fair trial would be impossible due to serious mishandling of the investigation by the Royal Military Police (RMP). The RMP had failed to interview several key witnesses, taken two years to arrest the accused for questioning under caution, and three years to bring the case to trial. All the accused were released without further charges.

An internal review commissioned by the Ministry of Defence confirmed multiple failings by the Royal Military Police. It noted that, in addition to recruits who had lodged formal complaints, 'a considerable number of JS [junior soldier recruits] who had been the subject of ill treatment / assaults' had not wished to do so. It also cited testimony of maltreatment at battle camp in the previous year.

== Background ==
The British army enlists new recruits from age 16. Recruits aged between 16 and 17.5 years, known as Junior Soldiers (JS), undergo six or 12 months of initial training based at the Army Foundation College in Harrogate, Yorkshire. Towards the end of this period, recruits destined for the infantry travel to battle camp in Kirkcudbright in Dumfries and Galloway for one week, which includes a day of bayonet practice. On passing out from the Army Foundation College, infantry recruits transfer to the Infantry Training Centre in Catterick, Yorkshire, to complete their training.

Allegations of abuse at the Army Foundation College have been common. Between 2014 and 2020, recruits made 62 formal complaints of violent behaviour by staff, including battery and assault.

== Allegations and charges ==
Among the initial allegations reported in the Mail on Sunday on 12 August 2017 were that seventeen instructors from the Army Foundation College, having taken their trainees to battle camp in Kirkcudbright, had pushed cow dung into the recruits' mouths, held their heads under water, and kicked and punched them repeatedly during bayonet training.

The recruits concerned were aged 17. One was Joe Turton, who told the Child Rights International Network that abuse had been routine throughout his year at AFC, and then at battle camp:

The corporals come into the hangar where we sleep and they're wild-eyed, screaming, shoving people out. A massive sergeant lifts a recruit in the air and literally throws him into the wall. A corporal smacks me full-force around the head - I’ve got my helmet on but he hits me so hard that I’m knocked right over, I mean this man’s about 40 and I’m maybe 17 by then. A bit later, we’re crawling through mud and a corporal grabs me and drags me along the ground, half-way across a field. When he lets go I’m in that much pain that I’m whimpering on the ground. When the other corporal, the one who hit me, sees me crying on the ground, he just points at me and laughs.

The accused were corporals and sergeants and included veterans of the Afghanistan War and Iraq War. They faced 40 charges of battery, actual bodily harm and other ill-treatment. All accused denied any wrongdoing.

== Court martial ==
By the time of the preliminary hearing of 21 September 2017, charges against seven of the accused had been dropped, leaving ten defendants to face 25 counts of ill-treatment and six of battery. All defendants entered not-guilty pleas.

The trial began on 12 February 2018 at Bulford Military Court Centre with Assistant Judge Advocate General Alan Large presiding. After the opening prosecution arguments, the defence applied to have the proceedings stayed as an abuse of process, meaning that the allegations were not investigated and brought to court in proper order. The judge agreed and, describing the investigation as 'seriously flawed' and 'totally blinkered', criticised the military police for failing to interview key witnesses and taking too long to bring the case to trial. On grounds that the defendants could no longer be tried fairly, the judge stayed the case and all defendants were released.

== Timeline ==
The following chronology is summarised from the legal judgement.

- June 2014: A cohort of infantry recruits aged 17 from the Army Foundation College in Harrogate travel to battle camp in Kirkcudbright, where the incidents allegedly took place. The recruits concerned did not make a complaint at the time.
- September 2014: The recruits concerned, now based at the Infantry Training Centre in Catterick, are overheard by staff as they discuss the alleged incidents at Battle Camp. Their accounts are recorded informally and passed to the chain of command for action. The Royal Military Police are contacted.
- October 2014: The military police take formal witness statements from the recruits concerned, some of whom allege abusive treatment by instructors at battle camp during bayonet practice between 6 and 15 June. A statement is also taken from the Staff Sergeant responsible for delivering bayonet training at battle camp that June, who declares that he did not witness any ill treatment at the time. Other instructors were also present, including some of the accused, but statements were not taken from them. The reason for this, as explained later to the Court Martial by the officer in charge of the investigation, was that collecting these additional witness statements would have caused delay and 'the permanent staff [i.e. the instructors] were unlikely to corroborate any allegations of assaults or manhandling of the JS [i.e. the Junior Soldiers or trainees]'. In giving evidence to the court martial, the officer said of the battle camp instructors: 'It was unlikely they would say they had witnessed anything—they were likely to say they had not seen anything... If they said they had witnessed it and done nothing they would have incriminated themselves.'
- December 2014: By this point, approximately 40 junior soldiers have made allegations against approximately 30 members of staff.
- September 2016: Two years after the alleged incidents, the accused are arrested and questioned under caution.
- July 2017: The Service Prosecution Authority, which prosecutes on behalf of the armed forces, sends the case for trial at court martial.
- September 2017: At the preliminary hearing of the court martial on 21 September, all defendants plead not guilty pending a full hearing from 12 February 2018.
- February 2018: After the prosecution arguments, defence counsel argue that the failure to interview potential key witnesses, as well as the long delay between the alleged incidents and trial amount to an abuse of process and they apply for the proceedings to be stayed. The judge agrees and the five defendants are released on the grounds that a fair trial is no longer possible.

== Reaction ==
The collapse of the case was reported on the BBC ITV, STV, and in the Guardian, Mirror, Northern Echo, Telegraph, Times, Yorkshire Evening Post, and Yorkshire Post.

Lewis Cherry, a defence lawyer at the court martial interviewed for the BBC said he was 'appalled' by the failure of the military police to conduct its investigation in proper order, and said his clients would be 'relieved that the nightmare of these false allegations hanging over them for many years is over'.

Human rights campaigners argued that the 'multiple failures' that led to the case collapsing showed that the military should not be entrusted to administer its own justice. The campaign group ForcesWatch said that the case's collapse meant that 'serious allegations of abuse against some of the army's youngest recruits have gone untested'.

The Ministry of Defence announced an internal review.

Following the trial's collapse, four of the accused, named by the army as Sgt Comely, Cpl Armitage, Sgt Girault and Sgt Bryan, initiated a formal complaint. In response, the army issued a formal apology to each of them.

== Internal review ==
The internal review reported in June 2018, finding multiple failings by the Royal Military Police. It noted:

- The vulnerability of the recruits affected, who being aged under 18 years carried the legal status of children at the time. Some had reported feeling intimidated by the process.
- 12 recruits had been willing to make a formal complaint against up to 30 instructors and 'a considerable number of JS [junior soldier recruits] who had been the subject of ill treatment / assaults' did not wish to make such a complaint (para 6.2.10).
- Suspects were allowed to continue in their roles at the Army Foundation College while the investigation proceeded (para 6.2.15).
- All staff present at battle camp who were interviewed as part of the investigation had denied any wrongdoing and said they did not witness any mistreatment of recruits (para 6.2.8).
- A data card containing between 100 and 500 photographs taken by staff on the day of the abuse at battle camp went missing (para 6.2.9).
- Allegations had also been made of abuse of recruits by staff in the previous year (2013) and no action had been taken (para 6.2.16).
- By the end of the investigation, '41 JS had made S9 [Section 9] statements alleging assault or ill treatment. Numerous other JS provided S9 statements that supported the allegations but were not able to identify the victims or suspects. 31 suspects had been identified.'

== See also ==
- Army Foundation College
- Children in the military
- Recruit training
