= Army Apprentices College =

The Army Apprentices College was a college system in the United Kingdom that offered military training, education and common core skills, leadership and adventurous training, character development and trade training.

== History ==
The advent of mechanised warfare during World War I left the Army requiring technically-skilled tradesmen in large numbers. Realising that not enough qualified tradesmen would be able to be recruited from civilian life, the Army Council resolved in 1919 to develop a system to train boys as tradesmen directly after leaving school. There were already a few boys' training establishments in existence; but the decision was taken to establish a new central school, which would be able to accommodate around a thousand boys.

This led to the opening of the Boys' Technical School at Beachley Barracks, Gloucestershire, England, on 28 February 1924. (Beachley Barracks is sometimes described as Chepstow barracks, even though Chepstow is on the opposite bank of the river Wye in Monmouthshire, Wales.) Five years later in 1929 it was renamed Army Technical School (Boys). Recruits in the 1930s joined as Apprentice Tradesmen at age 14 or 15, and usually spent three to four years at the school before being posted to one of the Army's technical corps (mainly Royal Artillery, Royal Engineers, Royal Army Service Corps and Royal Tank Regiment).

Certain other army establishments also trained boys in the mid-1930s, including the Military College of Science at Woolwich (for Royal Artillery Artificers), the Royal Army Ordnance Corps Schools of Instruction at Hilsea and Bramley (for RAOC Armourers) and Chatham (for the Royal Engineers). In 1937, however, the decision was taken to open three more full-scale Army Technical Schools, each to accommodate a thousand boys. It was envisaged that the schools would be located at Arborfield (for the RAOC), Chatham (for the Engineers) and Jersey (for the RASC); however, although Arborfield opened in May 1939, the Chatham school did not materialise and the Jersey school closed when the island fell to the Germans.

In 1947, new schools opened in Harrogate and Taunton and (together with Chepstow and Arborfield) they were collectively renamed as Army Apprentices Schools. Taunton closed just two years later, but another new school was opened in 1960 in Carlisle. In the 1960s, Apprentice Tradesmen for the Royal Engineers were trained at Chepstow, those for the Royal Corps of Signals at Harrogate, and those for the Royal Electrical and Mechanical Engineers at both Arborfield (which focused on electrician and electronics trades) and Carlisle (which focused on training armourers, gun fitters, instrument technicians and vehicle mechanics).

The schools were once more renamed as the Army Apprentices Colleges in 1966. Following Carlisle's closure three years later, apprenticeship training for REME all took place at Arborfield (which was known as Princess Marina College between 1981 and 1995).

== List of schools/colleges ==
The following locations are listed on the Army Apprentice National Memorial at the National Memorial Arboretum (dates are indicated where known):

- Aldershot (1923–1924)
- Arborfield (1939–2004)
- Ashvale (RAMC/RADC Apprentices College) (1964–1985)
- Bramley (1936–1939)
- Carlisle (1960–1969)
- Catterick
- Chatham (1939)
- Beachley Barracks (1924–1994)
- Church Crookham (RAMC Apprentices) (–1964)
- Deepcut (RAOC Apprentices College) (1970–1985)
- Harrogate (1947–1996)
- Hilsea (RAOC Boys School) (1925–1953)
- Jersey (1938–1940)
- Taunton (1947–1949)
- Woolwich
- Worthy Down (RAPC Apprentices College) (1964–1985)

== See also ==
- The Association of Harrogate Apprentices which is an "Old Boys' Association" for former members of the Army Apprentices School (eventually College) at Harrogate, North Yorkshire.
- Beachley Barracks
