= Army Foundation College =

British Army training unit in Yorkshire, England

Coordinates: 53.9939°N 1.5974°W

Army Foundation College Harrogate
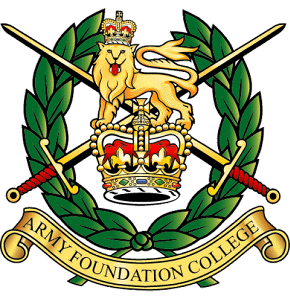
- Active: 1947 – 1996 (as the Army Apprentices School, Harrogate); 3 August 1998 – Present
- Country: United Kingdom
- Branch: British Army
- Role: Phase 1 Training establishment
- Size: ~1,300 soldiers under training ~500 permanent staff
- Part of: Initial Training Group (ITG)
- Location: Uniacke Barracks, Penny Pot Lane, Harrogate HG3 2SE
- Mottos: Trust, Courage, Team Spirit
- Colours: Red, Yellow, Blue, Black & Green

Commanders
- Commanding Officer: Lt Col Jules Russell ETS
- Honorary Colonel: Col Bear Grylls OBE

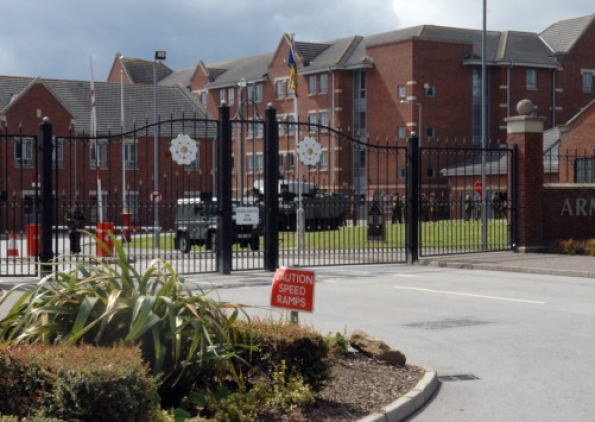
Army Foundation College gates

The Army Foundation College (AFC) in Harrogate, England, is the sole initial military training unit for British Army recruits who enlist aged between 16 and 17.5 years.

AFC delivers two 'Phase 1' initial training courses: the 'long course' of 49 weeks, mainly for recruits in combat roles, and the 23-week 'short course' for recruits in most other roles. In addition to their military training, recruits are enrolled onto basic Functional Skills courses in English, maths, and ICT.

Approximately 1,200 boys and 100 girls begin training at AFC annually, of whom approximately 500 are enrolled for the infantry. On average, 70% of recruits complete their course, then moving to other army units for their 'Phase 2' role-specific training.

AFC is graded 'outstanding' for welfare by Ofsted but has also attracted criticism for the physical and sexual abuse of recruits, high running costs, and racist abuse against black staff.

== History ==
The Royal Signals Apprentices School was established in Harrogate to provide military and vocational training for the Royal Corps of Signals, Royal Artillery (RA) and Royal Engineers (RE) in 1947. It was renamed the Army Apprentices College in 1961 when the RA and RE were relocated, providing Royal Signals training until it closed in 1998. In September 1998, the site reopened as the Army Foundation College to provide initial military training to the army's youngest other ranks trainees, aged between 16 years and 17 years, 5 months, for a range of combat arms and services. It was rebuilt by Jarvis under a private finance initiative contract worth £526.6 million between 2000 and 2002.

Tom Moore was appointed as the first honorary colonel of the college on his 100th birthday, in recognition of his fundraising success during the 2020 COVID-19 pandemic. When acting in that capacity, he was addressed as 'Colonel Tom'. In July 2024, Bear Grylls was appointed Honorary Colonel of the college.

=== Ofsted grade ===
In 2018 and 2021, the education inspectorate Ofsted awarded the college an 'outstanding' grade for its duty of care. The 2021 report noted: 'Recruits speak consistently of fair and respectful treatment from all staff...'

== Training ==
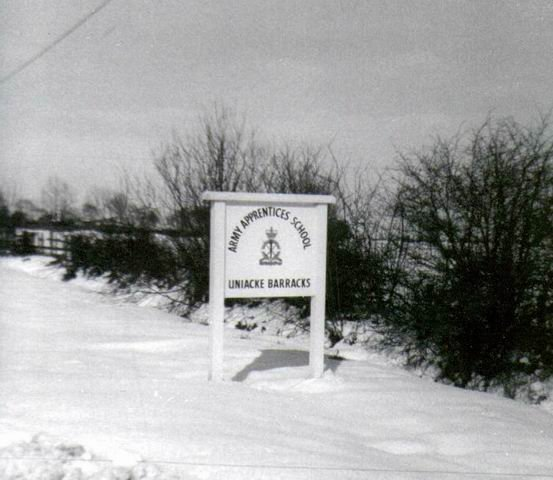
Welcoming board to the Army Apprentices School, Harrogate in March 1965

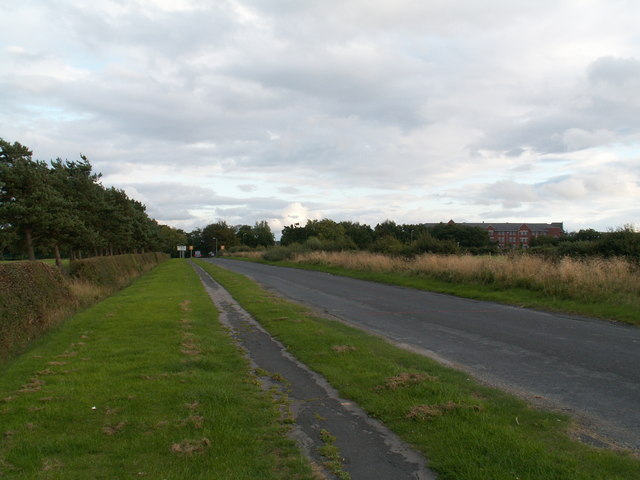
The Army Foundation College in August 2006

AFC delivers two Phase 1 (initial military training) courses:

- Junior Soldiers enlisted for roles in combat arms (the Infantry, Royal Artillery, Household Cavalry and Royal Armoured Corps) are enrolled on a 49-week course. Junior Soldiers enlisted for roles in the Parachute Regiment are also enrolled on the Operation Achilles pathway during their last 12 weeks of phase 1 training.
- Junior Soldiers enlisted for other army trades complete a shorter, 23-week course.

Despite the differing course lengths, all recruits are trained to the same standard of the Common Military Syllabus (see Selection and Training in the British Army).

== Intake and retention ==
There are two entry points annually, in September and March; and two graduations, in August and February.

Each year, approximately 1,200 boys and 100 girls begin their army training at AFC, of whom approximately 500 are training for infantry roles.

Official figures for the period from 2017–18 to 2020–21 show that, on average, 70% of recruits on the 49-week course complete their year at the college.

The British Army's policy of enlisting from age 16 has been criticised for leading to lower trainee retention than is found among adult recruits.

== Education ==
In addition to initial military training, Junior Soldiers can study Functional Skills courses in maths, English and IT at Levels 1 and 2, provided by Pearson TQ. Those who already have qualifications in mathematics and English have the option to study two units of a BTEC Certificate in Public Services at Level 3, however not the full qualification.

== Graduation and retention ==
AFC's biannual passing out parades, attended by friends, family and VIPs, are second only in size to Trooping the Colour. Each event is usually celebrated with a flypast from the Royal Air Force, a musical performance from a Royal Corps of Army Music band, and a parachute display from one of the Army's parachute display teams.

== Running costs ==
As of 2023, it cost £85.5 million per annum to operate AFC; the cost of training an infantry soldier through AFC for Phase 1 and then at the Infantry Training Centre for Phase 2 was £170,000.

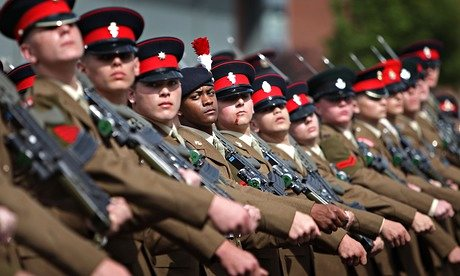
Junior soldiers graduation

== Controversy ==
=== Training and recruiting of child soldiers ===
Research in the United Kingdom has found that the enlistment and training of adolescent children, even when they are not sent to war, is often accompanied by a higher risk of suicide, stress-related mental disorders, alcohol abuse, and violent behavior. In view of developing children's rights standards and evidence showing a detrimental impact of military training and employment on younger recruits, several bodies, including the Children's Commissioners for each of the four nations of the UK and the UN Committee on the Rights of the Child, have also called on the armed forces to raise the minimum age of enlistment to 18.

In response to these concerns, the Ministry of Defence (MOD) has defended the current policy, stating in 2016: 'The army needs to attract school and college leavers at the earliest opportunity.' In the same year, the Chief of the General Staff, General Sir Nick Carter, added: '[T]he fact that our junior entry is always 100% manned is indicative of people finding that it is something that is really positive to do.'

=== Rape and sexual abuse of recruits ===
In 2021, nine investigations were opened into sexual offences against 22 girls at AFC; in one investigation, three of the suspected perpetrators were members of staff. The revelations were the subject of a Vice News report in July 2022.

In 2023, another instructor was convicted of eight counts of disgraceful conduct of a cruel or indecent kind and one count of sexual assault, which took place over nine months between 2020 and 2021.

Also in 2023, North Yorkshire Police revealed that 13 complaints of sexual assault AFC, including nine of rape, had been referred to them between July 2022 and August 2023.

=== Abuse and assaults against recruits ===
Between 2014 and 2022, recruits made 72 formal complaints of allegations of assault or other ill-treatment by staff at the college. 13 of the allegations were proven following investigation, of which seven occurred since 2017.

In 2021, an instructor was convicted for abusing recruits.

=== 2014–2018 Recruit abuse investigation ===
In 2017, the MOD confirmed reports that 17 instructors at AFC would be standing trial at court martial for 40 counts of alleged physical abuse of recruits during battle camp at Kirkudbright, Scotland, in 2014. ForcesTV, and the Guardian reported that the allegations included assault, holding trainees' heads under water, and forcing animal dung into their mouths. The case was reported as the British Army's largest ever investigation of abuse.

At a preliminary hearing in September 2017, the accused pleaded not guilty to all charges. The trial in February 2018 collapsed after the judge ruled that the investigation by the Royal Military Police had been 'seriously flawed', and that a fair trial for the defendants would no longer be possible.

An internal review confirmed multiple failings by the Royal Military Police. It noted that, in addition to recruits who had lodged formal complaints, 'a considerable number of JS [junior soldier recruits] who had been the subject of ill treatment / assaults' had not wished to do so.

=== Racist abuse against Black people ===
In 2024 Kerry-Ann Knight, a Black British woman and soldier with the rank of Corporal, won a settlement from the Ministry of Defence for racist and sexist abuse she suffered while in the British Army, much of which took place at the Army Foundation College. Knight served in the British Army for 12 years and was once considered the "face of British army recruitment" because she appeared prominently in military recruitment advertisements across the UK. In 2021 when she was the only Black British woman working in the college, fellow staff would shout "watermelon" when she approached, stack her desk with filthy crockery and boxes, loudly played Django Unchained, and post photographs of Adolf Hitler in the instructor's professional WhatsApp channel. Knight began to secretly record evidence of the abuse and captured audio of fellow staff members threatening to lynch her.

=== 2026 allegations of rape and abuse ===
In 2026 the BBC reported allegations of rape and abuse that occurred at the Army Foundation College and stated that 'A total of 176 complaints of inappropriate sexual behaviour at the college were made between January 2018 and June 2025'.

== See also ==
- Association of Harrogate Apprentices – includes a general history of Uniacke Barracks
- Selection and Training in the British Army
- Military recruitment
- Recruit training
- Military service
- Children in the military
- History of children in the military
- Army Foundation College recruit abuse investigation, 2014–18
