= 132 Battery (The Bengal Rocket Troop) Royal Artillery =

British Army artillery battery

- Active: 13 September 1816 to present
- Country: United Kingdom
- Allegiance: Hon East India Coy (till 1858); United Kingdom (post 1858)
- Branch: Army
- Type: Artillery
- Role: Deep Fires
- Size: Battery
- Part of: 26th Regiment Royal Artillery
- Nickname: The Bengals
- Anniversaries: 13 September (Foundation Day), Le Cateau Day 26 August
- Equipment: MLRS

132 Battery (The Bengal Rocket Troop) Royal Artillery is an MLRS Battery, that is part of the Royal Artillery. Its name is pronounced "one three two" or it is known as "The Bengals". The battery is one of the sub-units of 26th Regiment Royal Artillery, part of the British Army. It was formed in 1816 and is based in Larkhill.

== History ==
132 Battery (The Bengal Rocket Troop) Royal Artillery was raised on 13 September 1816 as a camel mounted unit in the service of the Honourable East India Company under the command of Captain (later General) William Samsen Whish. The troop carried a total of 912 six pound rockets, either in buckets on camels, or horse-drawn trolleys.

=== 19th century ===
- 1817 - The troop first saw action at the siege of Hathras in February 1817 and in the same year played a decisive role in the Pindari/Mahratta War. The mountainous terrain during the latter conflict resulted in the troop switching back to horseback.
- 1824 to 1826 - The troop served in the First Burmese War (1824–26) as the Rocket Troop Bengal Horse Artillery. Re-titled 2nd Troop, 2nd Brigade Bengal Horse Artillery in 1826, the Bengal Rocket Troop lost its rockets and gained 6 and 12 pound guns. It was involved in all major campaigns of the 19th century in India including in particular:
- 1843 - Maharajport
- 1849 - Goojerat
- 1878 to 1897 - Served in Great Britain
- 1889 - Troop was re-numbered as 52nd Field Battery in 1889, with further service in India from 1897 to 1911.

=== First World War ===
- 1914 - In the First World War the battery was virtually wiped out on 28 August 1914 at Le Cateau, losing all of its guns during the retreat from Mons. However, it saw out the rest of the war in Flanders, and for five months, in Italy.

=== Post War ===
After the war the Battery served in the United Kingdom until 1926, being mechanised in 1924. In 1927 the Battery saw service in China (Shanghai) followed by a return to India for the remaining years before the Second World War.

=== Second World War ===
During the Second World War the Battery served in the Western Desert, Eritrea, Syria, Palestine, Tunisia, Italy and Greece as part of 1st Field Regiment. It is particularly proud of its part in the action at Qineiquina* on the Egyptian / Libyan frontier on 25 November 1941. During the engagement the Battery helped defend the positions of 7th Indian Brigade, fighting in the open against no less than 28 tanks of the 21st Panzer Division's 5th Panzer Regiment. Despite the daunting onslaught, the gunners held their fire until the Panzers were within 500 metres, returning fire over open sights. After an intense duel lasting 45 minutes, the Germans withdrew having lost seven tanks and sustaining damage to a further four (by the evening of the 25th, 5th Panzer Regiment had only two operational tanks). The Battery suffered more than fifty casualties and five of its 25 pdrs were knocked out, but it had helped defeat Rommel's planned encirclement of the British forces East of the Solloum front.

- The engagement is also known as the Battle of the Omars - they being, Omar Nuovo, Libyan Omar and Sidi Omar.

The battery also served throughout the Italian campaign and fought at Cassino. [At Cassino, a notable incident took place. One of the Rocket Troop's 25-pounders suffered a 'premature' (a detonation within the gun barrel). The explosion blew open the end of the gun, ensuring that it could no longer fire. Bdr. L.O. Harris proceeded to cut off the shattered end of his 25-pounder's gun barrel with a hack-saw. The task took considerable time and effort, but upon completion, the gun was raised upon ammunition cases and successfully brought back into action. The unusual sound made by the modified 25-pounder's, shortened barrel and higher trajectory of the shell, reportedly lead the German defenders to presume that they were being engaged by a new British weapon.]

=== Post Second World War ===
- 1947 - The Battery was re-numbered 132 Field Battery and 1st Field Regiment became 59 Field Regiment.
- 1948 - The whole Regiment was converted to the heavy anti aircraft role until the disbandment of Anti Aircraft Command
- 1955 - The Battery went into suspended animation.
- 1958 - The Bengal Rocket Troop was revived as 132 Battery in 6 Field Regiment at Munsterlager
- 1962 - The Battery moved to Larkhill with the Regiment acting as Support Battery for the Royal School of Artillery.
- 1966 - The Regiment moved to the Far East where the Battery served in Malaya, Borneo and Sarawak until February 1968.
- 1968 - Joined 27 Medium Regiment at Devizes
- 1969 - Moved with 27 Medium Regiment to BAOR at Lippstadt as part of 4 Div.
- 1972 - The Battery joined 39 Regiment at Sennelager where it remained until April 1982. Between 1971 and 1981 the Battery completed five operational tours in Northern Ireland.
- 1982 - Following further reorganisation in BAOR, 132 Battery returned to Larkhill to form a Gun Battery in the Support Regiment at the Royal School of Artillery. In May 1982 sixteen members of the Battery formed a BC's and two observation parties for the Falklands campaign.
- 1985 - The Battery returned to rejoin 39 Heavy Regiment RA in Sennelager, equipped with M110 A2 8-inch (200 mm) Howitzers.

=== Post Cold War ===
- 1990 - The Battery reverted to their original role in September, when they were equipped with the American M270 Multiple Launch Rocket System and within five months saw active service in the Gulf War.
- 1993 and 1996 - 132 Battery served with 39 Regiment as part of the United Nations Peacekeeping Force in Cyprus having moved with the Regiment from Germany to Albemarle Barracks, Newcastle in August 1995.
- 1998 - Urban Reinforcement Battalion in Lisburn, Northern Ireland
- 2000 - Rural Reinforcement Battalion in Armagh County, Northern Ireland
- 2015 - Moved from 39th Regiment to 26th Regiment
- 2019 - The Battery moved to Purvis Lines, Larkhill as part of 26th Regiment's rebasing to Larkhill.
