= Beachley Barracks =

British army base

- Beachley, Gloucestershire in England
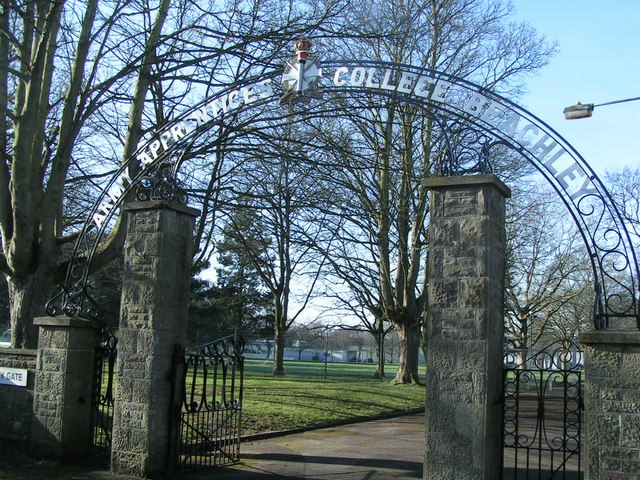
- Entrance to Beachley Barracks

Site information
- Type: Barracks
- Owner: Ministry of Defence
- Operator: British Army

Location
- Shown within Gloucestershire
- Coordinates: 51°37′13″N 002°39′11″W

Site history
- Built: 1915
- In use: 1915–present

Garrison information
- Occupants: 1st Battalion, The Rifles

Beachley Barracks is a British Army base at Beachley in Gloucestershire, England, close to the England–Wales border at Chepstow. The barracks is the home of 1st Battalion, The Rifles and is located at Beachley Point between the River Severn and the River Wye. It is set to close in 2031.

== History ==
In 1915, during the First World War, the government requisitioned a large area of land at Beachley and constructed National Shipyard No.2. However, the war ended before production had begun. Instead, in 1924 it was decided to establish a British Army Apprentices School (which in 1966 was renamed as an Army Apprentices College) at Beachley to ensure a core of technical qualified soldiers with technical education combined with military training as potential NCOs and officers mainly for the specialist corps Royal Engineers, REME plant operator mechanics and RAOC.

The 1st Battalion, The Rifles moved to the barracks in 2007.

The 1st Battalion, The Rifles returned to Beachley Barracks from a two year deployment in Dhekelia in 2025. They are due to move in 2031 to new build facilities at Caerwent Barracks, when the building project is complete, alongside 1st The Queen’s Dragoon Guards.

== Future ==
In November 2016, the Ministry of Defence announced that the site would close in 2027; this was later extended to 2031.

== Current units ==
Only one unit is currently stationed at the barracks:

- 1st Battalion, The Rifles
