= Priory Church of St Mary, Chepstow =

Church in Monmouthshire, Wales

Coordinates: 51°38′33.60″N 2°40′20.02″W

St Mary's Church
- The Parish and Priory Church of St Mary
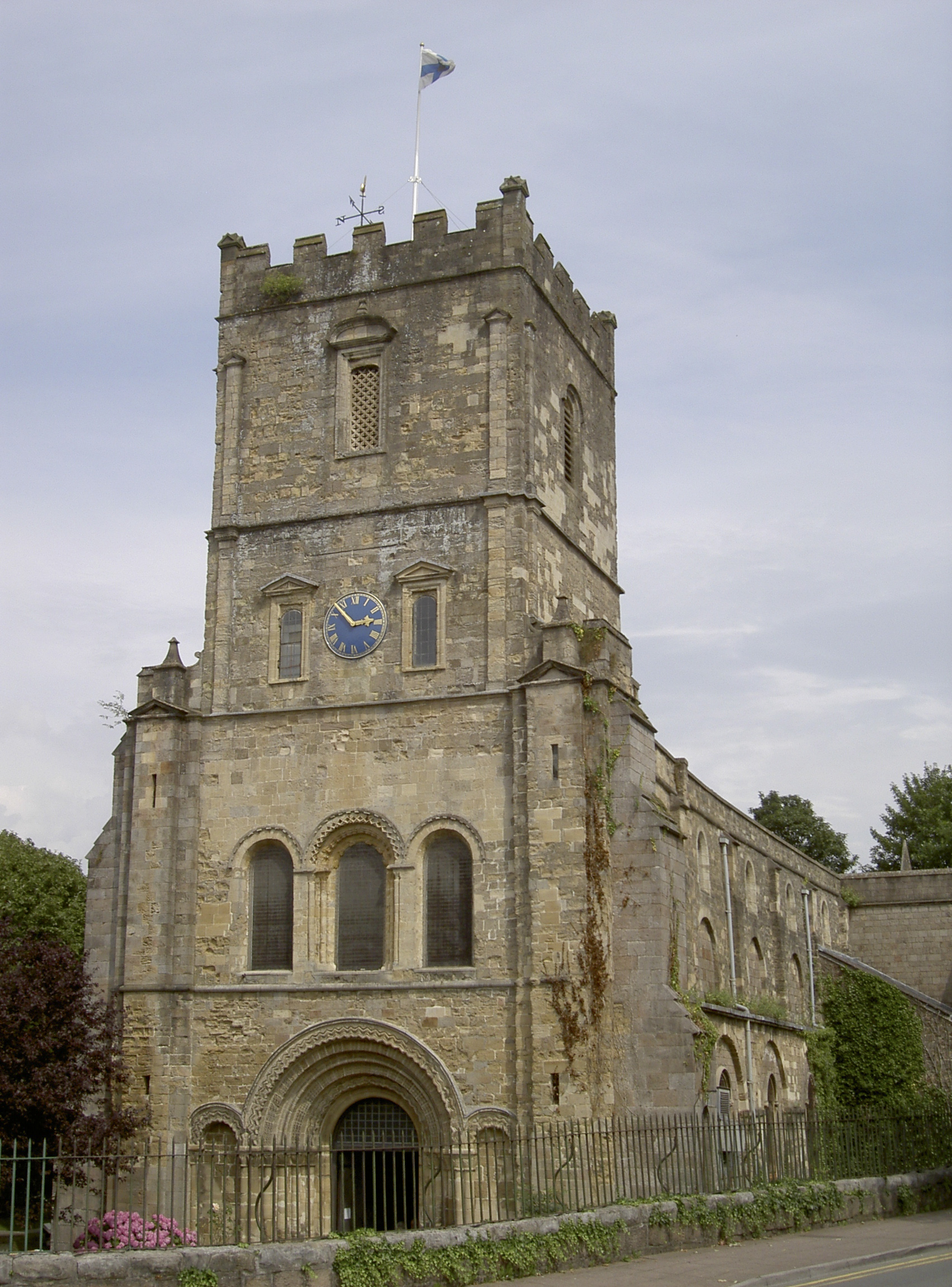
- St Mary's Church
- Country: Wales
- Denomination: Church in Wales
- Website: http://www.chepstowparish.co.uk

Administration
- Diocese: Monmouth

Clergy
- Vicar: Revd Philip Averay

The Parish and Priory Church of St Mary is located in Chepstow, Monmouthshire, south east Wales. Parts of the building, including its ornate west doorway, date from the late 11th century and are contemporary with the nearby Norman castle. The church is a Grade I listed building.

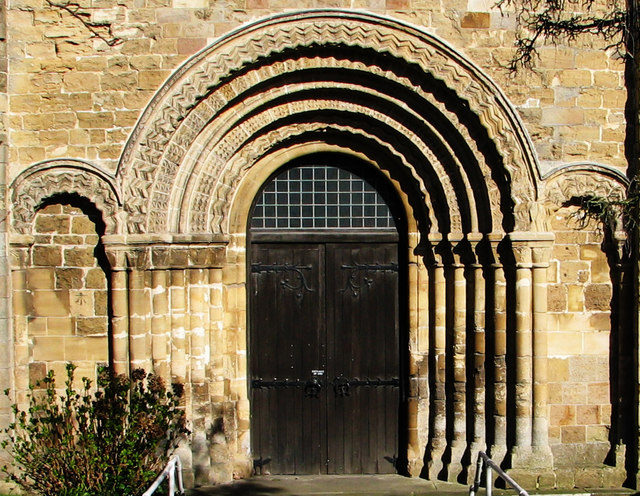
The early 12th-century Norman doorway of St Mary's Priory Church

== Foundation and history of the priory ==
It was founded around 1072 as a Benedictine priory by William FitzOsbern and his son Roger de Breteuil, 2nd Earl of Hereford. FitzOsbern had been granted the Lordship of Striguil by his second cousin King William in gratitude for his support in the Norman Conquest of England, and was responsible for starting the building of a new castle overlooking the River Wye on the border with the kingdoms of Wales. At the same time he established a nearby monastic cell, so as to collect rent from the lands within Gwent which he had granted to his home Priory of Cormeilles in Normandy. By the early 12th century, the monastic establishment, on a ridge overlooking the river about 300 metres from the castle, had the status of an alien priory in its own right, though it probably never held more than about 12 monks. It superseded an earlier Augustinian priory located about 2 km away, which was dedicated to the Welsh saint Cynfarch (or Saint Kingsmark), a disciple of Saint Dyfrig.

As Chepstow developed as a market town and port around the castle and priory during the mediaeval period, the nave became used as the parish church. Accommodation was built on the south side of the church, in the 13th century, and the first vicar appointed by authority of the king, John de Hemmyngburg, is recorded in 1348. The priory had extensive grounds, probably including most of the land south of the church enclosed by Chepstow's 13th-century town wall or Port Wall. During the Hundred Years' War between England and France in the 14th century, the priory became detached from its association with Cormeilles, and instead became attached at different times both to Llantarnam Abbey near Caerleon and, from 1414, to Bermondsey Abbey in Southwark. The priory was eventually suppressed during the Dissolution of the Monasteries in 1536 during the English Reformation, at which time there were still three monks in residence. Most of the priory buildings, including the choir part of the church, the cloister, chapter house, lodgings and kitchens, were demolished at that time, and the foundations are buried beneath a car park beside the current church. Remains of a large barn and well were also found during excavations in the 1970s.

== The present building ==
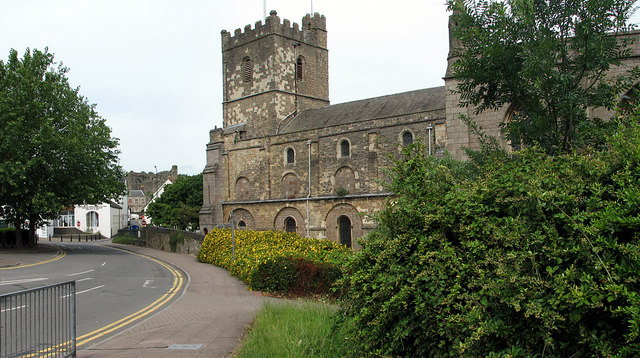
View of St Mary's Church from the south-east

Part of the Norman church remains, but it has been greatly modified over later centuries. The original Priory Church was built in local yellow Triassic sandstone, with a long vaulted nave, massive piers, and a notably ornamented west entrance doorway with zigzag and lozenge patterns, dating from the early 12th century. These parts remain. However, later extensions and modifications have used other varieties of stone in other architectural styles, with the result that the whole church has been described as "an extraordinarily disjointed building."

The main central tower of the original church collapsed in a storm in 1701, destroying the transepts. A new wall was then built at the eastern end of the nave, and its western end built up to form a new tower, designed "in an amusingly rustic classical idiom". This was completed in 1706 under the ministry of Thomas Chest, who was vicar from 1701 to 1740. In 1841, through the influence of Edward Copleston, Bishop of Llandaff, who lived locally, the aisles were removed, and the eastern end, crossing and transepts were rebuilt. Further work partly to restore the Norman character of the nave was begun in 1890, but was abandoned unfinished in 1913.

The church contains two fonts, one of Norman origin and the other from the 15th century. There are several notable tombs and memorials, including that of Henry Somerset, 2nd Earl of Worcester, and the Jacobean tomb of local benefactor Margaret Cleyton with her two husbands and 12 children. It also contains the tomb of Henry Marten, signatory to King Charles I's death warrant, who was imprisoned in Chepstow Castle until his death in 1680. His memorial includes an acrostic epitaph.

The organ, one of the few in the country with pipework dating from the early 17th century, was originally made for Gloucester Cathedral (possibly by the Dallam family). It was moved to Bristol Cathedral in 1663 and then to Chepstow possibly as early as 1685, and certainly by the 18th century. It was rebuilt and expanded in 1906, and has undergone a variety of maintenance and repair work since. Eight of the ten bells in the tower date from 1735 and were made in Chepstow by William Evans; the two lightest bells were added in 1959 and were cast by John Taylor & Co. The original clock mechanism was also made locally in the 18th century, and kept time until replaced by an electric clock in 1965.

The church was designated a Grade I listed building on 12 June 1950.

== Notable clergy ==
- John Davies, former Bishop of Swansea and Brecon, and Archbishop of Wales served his curacy here.
