= George Hotel (Kanosh, Utah) =

- U.S. National Register of Historic Places
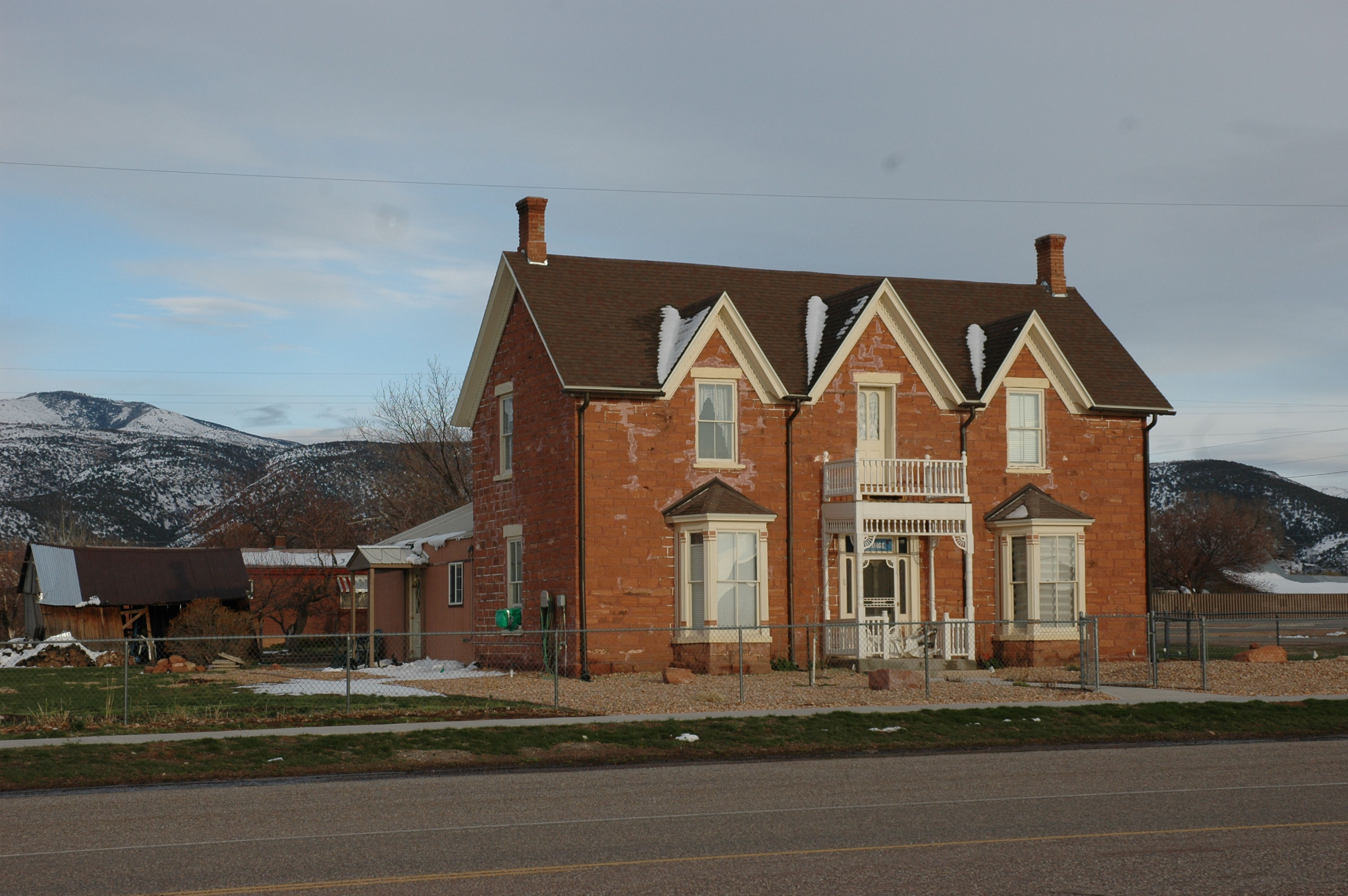

- Location within Utah Location within the United States
- Location: 10 N. Main, Kanosh, Utah
- Coordinates: 38°48′06″N 112°26′13″W
- Area: 0.6 acres (0.24 ha)
- Built: c. 1887
- Built by: James Gardner, William George,
- Architectural style: Gothic Revival, Cross wing
- NRHP reference No.: 05000594
- Added to NRHP: June 10, 2005

The George Hotel, at 10 N. Main in Kanosh, Utah, was built around 1887. It was listed on the National Register of Historic Places in 2005. The listing included three contributing buildings.

It is a one-and-a-half-story, T-shaped crosswing-plan dwelling, built of random sandstone ashlar masonry. It reflects Classical, Gothic Revival, and Victorian Eclectic styles, but is overall mostly Gothic Revival.

It is a stone building which was built by James Gardner and William George.
