= The George Hotel, Reading =

The George Hotel
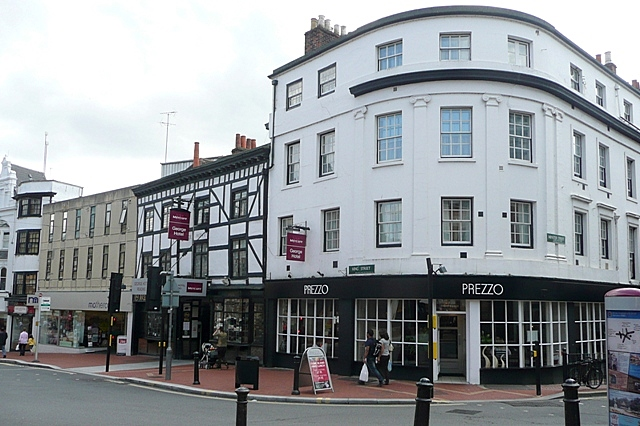
- 18th century coaching Inn (left) 19th century addition (right)

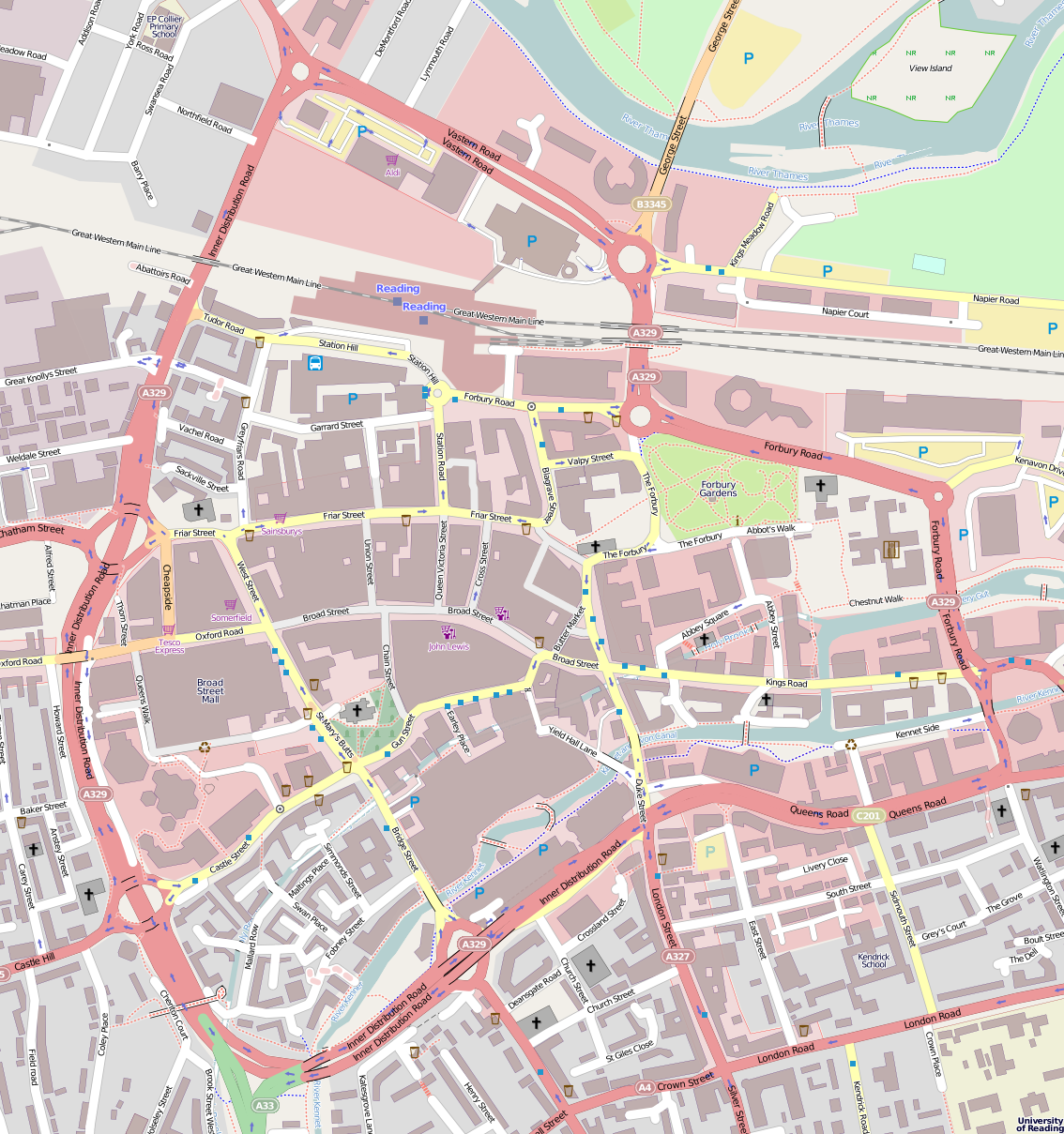
- Location in Reading

General information
- Location: Reading, Berkshire, UK, 10 - 12 King Street; Reading; Berkshire; RG1 2HE
- Coordinates: 51°27′17″N 0°58′12″W
- Opening: 1423

Other information
- Number of rooms: 76
- Number of restaurants: 2

Listed Building – Grade II
- Official name: The George Hotel
- Designated: 22 March 1957
- Reference no.: 1155931

The George Hotel is a hotel and former coaching inn in the town of Reading in the English county of Berkshire. It is situated at the eastern end of the town centre, on the corner of King Street and Minster Street, next to The Oracle shopping mall. It is a Grade II listed building.

== History ==
First mentioned in 1423, the George Inn was one of the busiest in Reading in the late 16th century. It was one of the major coaching inns between London and the West Country in the 18th century.

In 2021, the George was used by the Home Office as temporary accommodation for refugees from Afghanistan, and this was still ongoing in October 2025

== Gallery ==
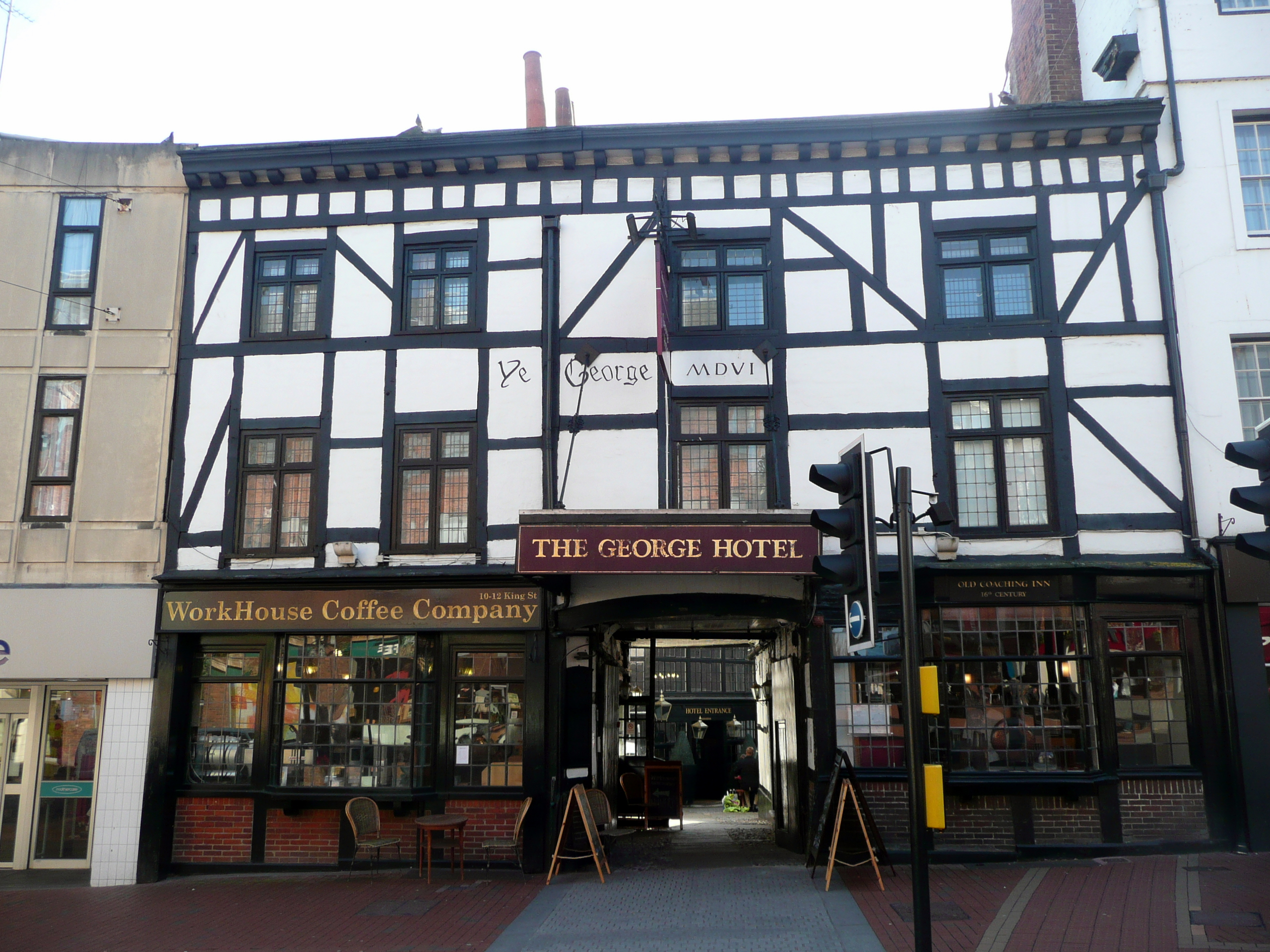
18th century facade

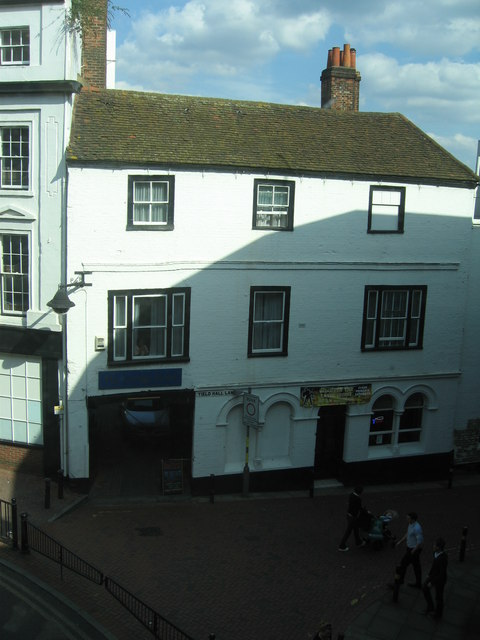
Entrance on Yield Hall Lane

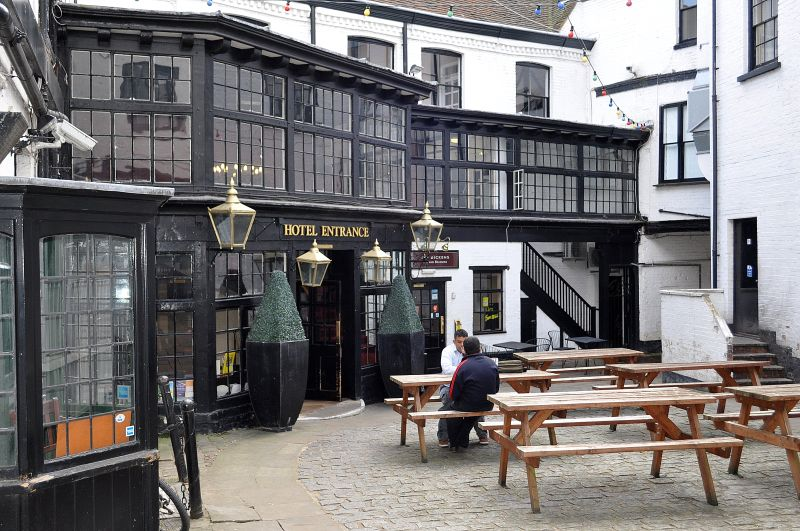
Interior entrance in the Courtyard
