= Fort Darland =

Coordinates: 51°22′12″N 0°33′32″E

Fort Darland was a post-mediaeval infantry fort built from 1870 to 1900 as part of the defensive network for Chatham Dockyard. It was demolished in the 1960s and the site used for housing. Some earthworks and encasement remain and are visible on aerial photographs.

During the Second World War Fort Darland was a British Army detention centre. The camp was one of twelve military detention centres in England, Scotland, and the Orkney and Shetland Islands. First and second-time offenders were sent to seven of the twelve prisons. Fort Darland drew Parliamentary attention after Rifleman William Clarence Clayton perished while incarcerated; two British Army Warrant Officers were criminally charged after an investigation into Clayton's death.

In addition to British Army personnel being incarcerated, members of the Canadian Army were also sentenced to Fort Darland upon conviction of first-time offences, usually sent up by their Commanding officers.

Prior to Fort Darland becoming a detention centre it was an Army Technical school for boys, built in 1938 and opened for its first intake. In March 1939 it served as a school for both Royal Engineer and Royal Artillery enlisted boys. In 1940 during the Dunkirk evacuation the school became a transit camp for men returning from France the pupils having been sent home and subsequently to other Army schools.

After the war, the fort's tunnels were used as a mushroom farm.
