= Chepstow Port Wall =

Grade I listed building in Wales

Coordinates: 51.640153°N 2.67571°W

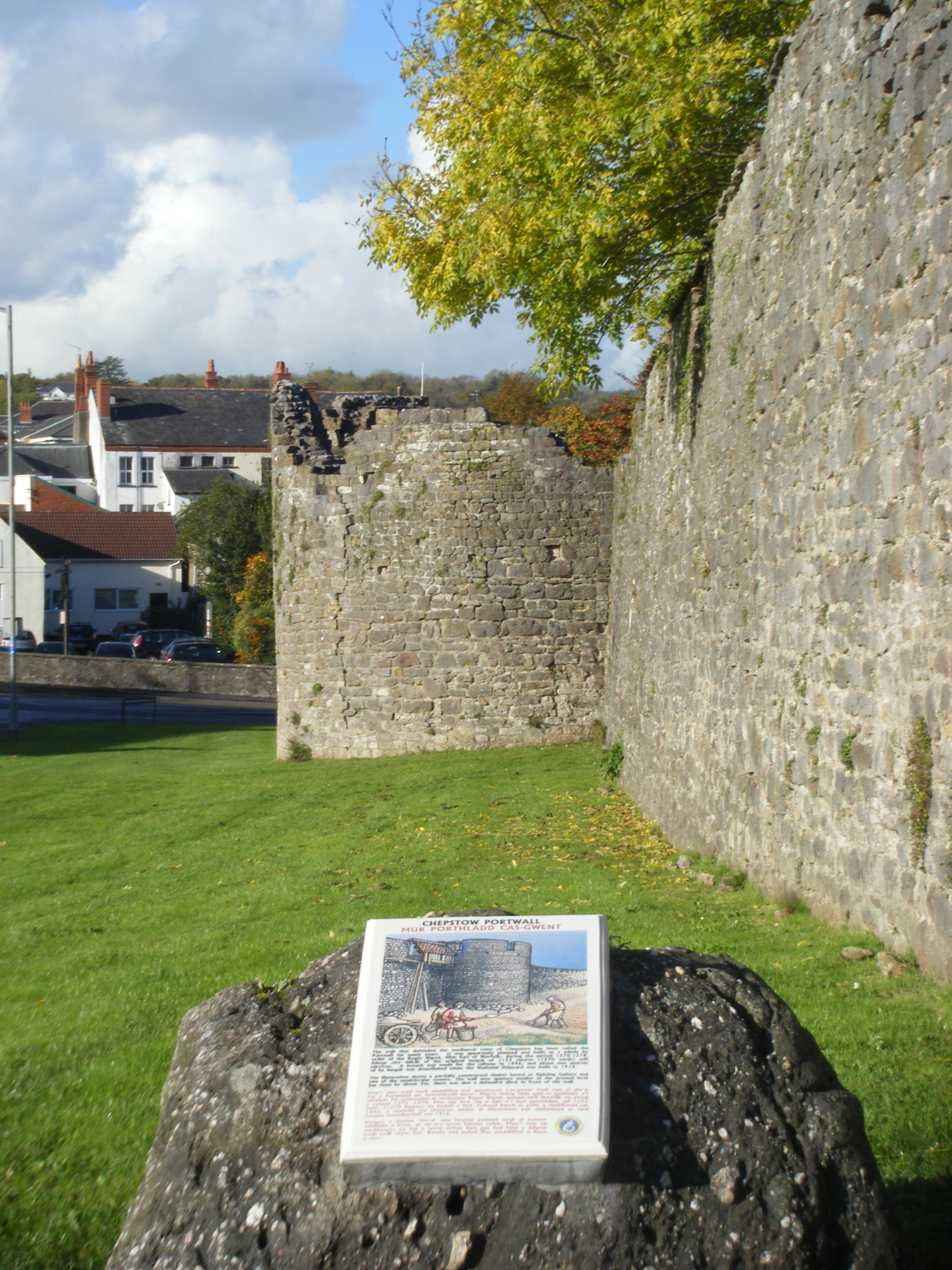
Part of the Port Wall, Chepstow, showing an information board prepared by the Chepstow Society

The Port Wall in Chepstow, Monmouthshire, Wales, is a late thirteenth century stone wall, which was constructed for the twin purposes of defence and tax collection by permitting users of the town's market only one point of access through the wall at the Town Gate. The wall originally formed a semi-circle extending for some 1,100 metres (3,600 ft), roughly southwards from Chepstow Castle to the River Wye. It enclosed an area of 53 hectares (130 acres), including the entire town and port as it existed at that time. Substantial sections of the wall remain intact, and both the Port Wall and the Town Gate are Grade I listed buildings. The Port Wall is a Scheduled monument.

== History ==
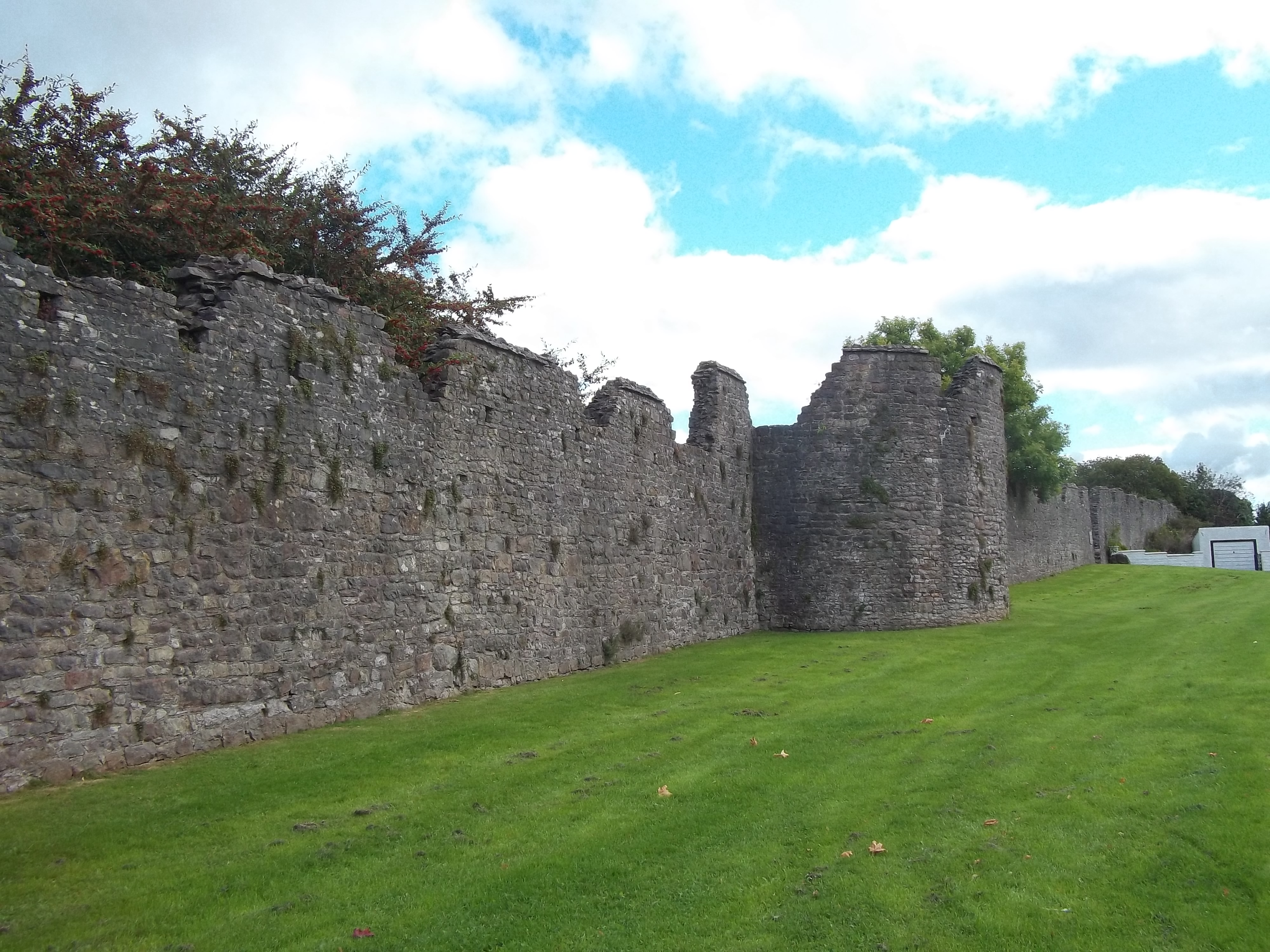
Part of the Port Wall

After the Norman conquest of England and parts of south Wales, Chepstow developed as an important port and trading centre within the Marcher Lordship of Striguil, the town's name deriving from ceape stowe meaning a trading place. The town and its priory were defended by its castle, established in 1067 and reconstructed and extended in stone on several occasions. The port was known for its exports of timber and bark, and its imports of wine from Gascony, Spain and Portugal. Because of its status as a Marcher lordship, dues were levied by the local lord, outside any direct control by the English crown. It has been suggested, but not confirmed, that the priory, castle and river crossing may originally have been defended by earthworks in a line some way to the east of the later stone wall, and that the market place initially grew up outside that line.

In 1270 the lordship came under the control of Roger Bigod, 5th Earl of Norfolk, after the death of his uncle. Bigod undertook a substantial building programme within and around Chepstow, including, at the castle, a new range of buildings for accommodation for himself and his family, and a massive new defensive tower (now known as "Marten's Tower"); and also, a few miles to the north, the rebuilding of Tintern Abbey. He was also responsible for the building of the Port Wall, usually dated at 1274–78, and the Town Gate; and, in 1294, for granting to his close associate, John ap Adam of Sedbury, the right to hold a regular market at Chepstow. The Port Wall and Town Gate together ensured that only those paying tolls to the lord could attend the market; and had the additional purpose of keeping out undesirable elements, including the occasionally hostile Welsh people living in the countryside to the west of the town. Much of the land within the walls was never built on, but was used as pasture, orchards and gardens, with wharves and shipyards on the river.

== Construction ==
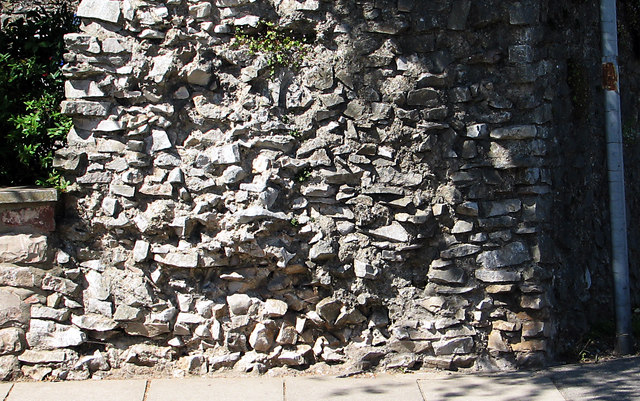
Section through the wall showing its rubble construction

The wall is, on average, about 5 metres (16 ft) high and 2 metres (6 ft 7 in) thick. It was built without any substantial foundations, and is faced with roughly squared blocks of stone ashlar and filled with rubble. It originally had a walkway along the inside and battlements along the top, and at least 11 outward-facing semi-circular towers, each about 8 metres in diameter. In some stretches there was a dry ditch outside the wall. It is uncertain whether the wall originally extended from the castle wall itself, or from a point across the Dell, a steeply sided valley which forms a natural moat on the south side of the castle.

== Remains ==
The wall remained wholly intact until it was breached in 1846 to allow the construction of the railway line between Chepstow and Newport. The stretch of wall running south of the railway line to the river was then demolished in 1916 for the development of the National Shipyard No.1 during the First World War, and a further gap was opened up in the wall shortly afterwards to enable the children of shipyard workers in the newly built Hardwick Garden City estate, just outside the wall, pedestrian access to their school. Gaps in the wall were later opened to give vehicle access to the main town car park at Welsh Street in the 1960s, and for a new relief road (A48) in the early 1970s.

The Port Wall was given Grade I Listed Building status on 24 March 1975.

== See also ==
- List of Cadw properties
- List of town walls in England and Wales
