= 1st Battalion, The Rifles =

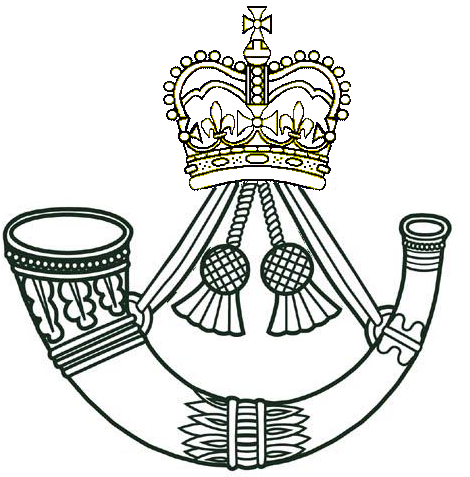
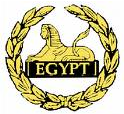
- Cap and Back badges of The Rifles
- Active: 1 February 2007 –
- Country: United Kingdom
- Branch: British Army
- Type: Light Infantry
- Size: Battalion
- Part of: 7th Light Mechanised Brigade Combat Team
- Garrison/HQ: Beachley Barracks, Chepstow
- Mottos: Swift and Bold
- Colours: Rifle Green
- March: Quick: Mechanised Infantry; Double Past: Keel Row/Road to the Isles; Slow: Old Salamanca

Commanders
- Colonel Commandant: General Sir Nicholas Parker KCB CBE

Insignia
- Tactical Recognition Flash
- Arm Badge: Croix de Guerre; From Devonshire and Dorset Light Infantry
- Abbreviation: 1 RIFLES

1st Battalion, The Rifles (1 RIFLES) is a light infantry battalion of The Rifles under the command of 7th Light Mechanised Brigade Combat Team.

== History ==
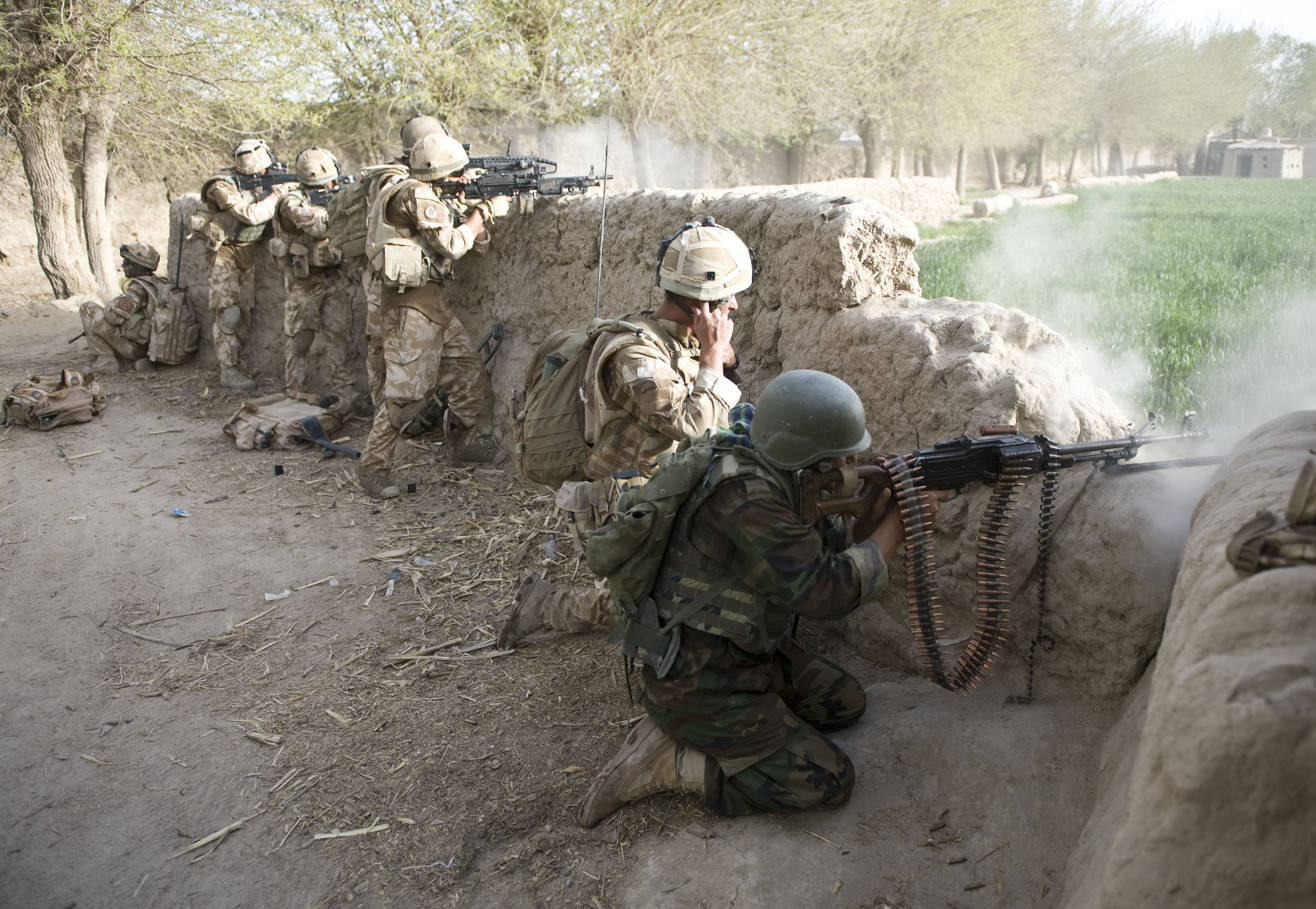
C Company 1 Rifles and the Afghan National Army engaging the Taliban in Helmand Province, Afghanistan in 2009.

The battalion formed on 1 February 2007 as part of 52 Infantry Brigade, merging the single battalions of the Devonshire and Dorset Regiment and the Royal Gloucestershire, Berkshire and Wiltshire Regiment. The battalion then moved in August 2007, to its permanent home of Beachley Barracks at Chepstow.

From 2008 to 2012, it was attached to 3 Commando Brigade as the fourth manoeuvre unit of the brigade alongside the three battalion sized commando units of the Royal Marines.

From March 2020, 1 RIFLES was deployed throughout Wales on Operation Rescript, supporting the UK's efforts to address the COVID-19 pandemic. The battalion helped install hospital beds at Dragon's Heart Hospital, a temporary critical care hospital for COVID-19.

== Future ==
The battalion is currently based in Dhekelia, British Forces Cyprus until 2025. 1 Rifles will return to Chepstow in the summer of 2025 to take on a new role as a Light Mechanised Battalion driving Foxhound vehicles. Towards the end of the decade, 1 Rifles will move to new build facilities at Caerwent Barracks.
