= George Hotel, Swaffham =

Hotel in Swaffham, Norfolk, England

George Hotel
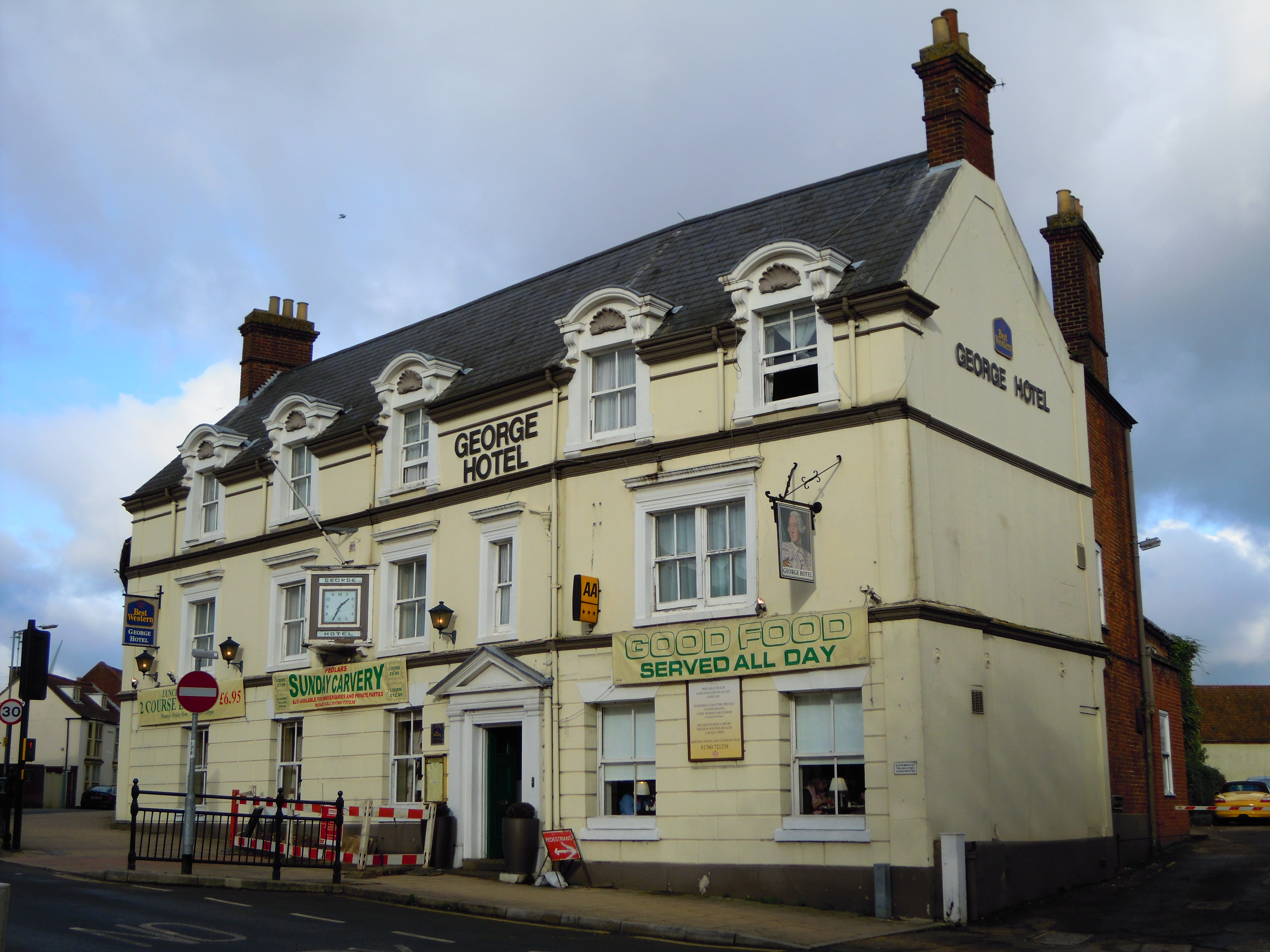
- Interactive map of the George Hotel area
- Hotel chain: The UK Holiday Group

General information
- Location: Swaffham, Norfolk, England
- Coordinates: 52°38′56.44″N 0°41′20.99″E

Technical details
- Floor count: 2

Other information
- Number of rooms: 28
- Number of restaurants: 1
- Number of bars: 1
- Parking: Yes

Website
- Hotel website

Listed Building – Grade II
- Official name: George Hotel
- Designated: 17 January 1973
- Reference no.: 1269579

The George Hotel is a three-star hotel located in Swaffham, Norfolk, England. The hotel is a Grade II listed building.

== Location ==
The hotel is close to the centre of the town and is 28.0 miles (45.1 km) west of the city of Norwich. The hotel is 17.5 miles (28.2 km) east from the nearest railway station which is at Downham Market. The nearest Airport is in Norwich and is 28.6 miles (46.0 km) west of the hotel.

== Description ==
The George Hotel was originally built in the early years of the 18th century with the main façade seen today built in 1860. The hotel was extended in 1979 with further developments added between 1988 and 1989.
