= Connah's Quay Power Station =

Gas-fired power station in Wales

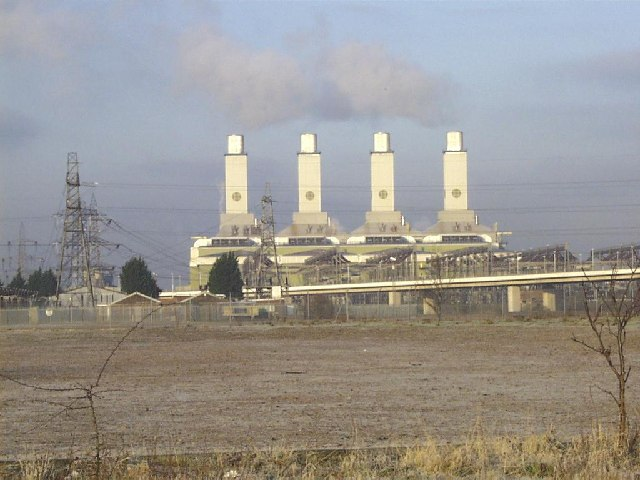
- Connah's Quay Power Station
- Country: Wales
- Location: Flintshire
- Coordinates: 53.232162°N 3.0813°W
- Status: Operational
- Commission date: 1954
- Owner: Uniper
- Operators: British Electricity Authority (1954); Central Electricity Authority (1954–1957); Central Electricity Generating Board (1957–1982); Powergen (1993–2002); E.ON UK (2002–2015); Uniper (2015–present)

Thermal power station
- Primary fuel: Natural gas
- Combined cycle?: Yes

Power generation
- Units operational: 4 × 330 MW
- Nameplate capacity: 1,420 MW

External links
- Website: www.uniper.energy/united-kingdom/power-plants-in-the-united-kingdom/connahs-quay
- Commons: Related media on Commons

Connah's Quay Power Station is the name of the current 1,420 MW gas-fired power station near Connah's Quay in Flintshire in North Wales. The power plant, which is situated on the south bank of the River Dee, is the modern successor to a coal-fired power station which closed in 1984 and demolished in 1992. The replacement gas-powered plant was completed in 1996 and began producing electricity a year later. It originally received its gas from the Point of Ayr terminal, which in turn comes from the offshore gas fields in Liverpool Bay.

The current Connah's Quay Power Station is not to be confused with Deeside Power Station, a similar CCGT power station with two chimneys situated on the north bank of the River Dee, one mile to the east of the Connah's Quay and the Flintshire Bridge.

== Coal power station ==
The station was initially planned by Chester City Council to be 60 megawatts (MW), but following the creation of the British Electric Authority it was increased to 180 MW. The station, which was located less than 1 km (0.62 mi) to the southwest of the current gas-powered station, was built to receive coal from Point of Ayr Colliery. It was brought to the site by special block trains and unloaded in sidings under the control of Rockcliffe Hall signalbox.

Building work was completed in three stages: 1953, 1955, and 1957. Each stage saw the installation of two 30 MW Parsons generating sets each being fed by International Combustion pulverized fuel fired Lopulco water tube type boilers with a steaming capacity of 300,000 Ib/hr. The water used by the station was cooled by three hyperbolic cooling towers.

Walter Citrine, 1st Baron Citrine, the chairman of the British Electricity Authority, formerly opened it on the 16 September 1954.

The electricity output and thermal efficiency of the station during its operating lights was as follows:

Connah's Quay coal-fired station output
Year	Electricity output, GWh	Thermal efficiency, %
1954	15.71	25.69
1955	228.26	26.40
1956	479.91	27.00
1957	750.71	27.22
1958	959.68	27.59
1961	1066.816	26.94
1962	1134.089	26.92
1963	882.688	26.84
1967	1019.216	26.46
1972	550.38	24.97
1979	498.06	24.94
1982	185.94	24.70

The station was closed in 1984 and demolished in 1992.

Since its decommission and demolition, the site of the old power station has remained undeveloped.

== Gas-fired CCGT station ==
Construction of Connah's Quay's new gas-fired station began in July 1993. The station, which is a Combined Cycle Gas Turbine (CCGT) plant was built as a turnkey project by GEC Alsthom with all principal equipment supplied by GEC Alsthom divisions. Henry Boot were sub-contracted to undertake the civil engineering and building works.

The station was completed in March 1996 and cost £580m. It was officially opened by MP Margaret Beckett, then-Secretary of State for Business and Trade, on 4 July 1997. In June 1998, the station's visitor centre opened. The station was initially owned by Powergen, who became E.ON UK in 2004 and was transferred to Uniper in 2015. The station is currently Uniper's largest CCGT power station.

As Connah's Quay is a CCGT power station, it runs on natural gas. The plant has four 330 MW modules - hence four chimneys. Each module has a General Electric Frame 9FA gas turbine, a Stein Industrie heat recovery steam generator and a steam turbine; in a single-shaft layout. The gas comes via an eighteen-mile pipeline from the Point of Ayr terminal, where gas is received from Eni's (formerly BHP and originally owned by Denver-based Hamilton Oil) Celtic gas fields (Hamilton and Hamilton North) in Liverpool Bay via the Douglas Complex. The station opened soon after the gas from the field was first produced. The station employs 81 people.

=== Gas treatment ===
The Point of Ayr Gas Terminal originally delivered 8.5 million cubic metres (300 million cubic feet) per day at standard conditions of treated gas to Connah's Quay. The fuel gas requirement of power station was about 6.5 million m^{3} (230 million ft^{3}); this left a gas surplus of about 2.0 million m^{3} (70 million ft^{3}) per day. The quality of this gas, although adequate for use in the power station, was not suitable for delivery to the National Transmission System (NTS). Because of the high nitrogen content (8–11 mol %) the Wobbe number was too low (45.9–48.1 MJ/m3) and the total sulphur content (35 ppm) was too high. A gas treatment plant with a capacity of 5.7 million m^{3} (200 million ft^{3}) (for times when the power station operated at reduced capacity) was constructed at Connah's Quay to treat the gas to a quality suitable for delivery to the NTS. The plant was owned and operated by PowerGen (now E.ON UK) and started up in November 1997, the plant was built by Costain's, the capital cost of the project was £40 million.

=== Current output ===
In the gas treatment plant gas passes through molecular sieves to remove sulphur to less than 15 ppm and water to less than 1 ppm to prevent ice formation in the downstream refrigeration plant. The dry sulphur-free gas passes through an activated carbon bed to remove any mercury to protect the downstream aluminium heat exchangers. The gas then passes to the cryogenic nitrogen removal system where it is cooled to -100 °C by Joule–Thomson chilling. In the pre-separation column the gas is separated into a methane stream and a nitrogen-rich stream. In the low temperature (-185 °C) double column the nitrogen-enriched gas is separated into the reject nitrogen stream containing less than 1.5% methane and a low pressure methane stream containing less than 1.5% nitrogen. The liquid methane stream is pumped to 1 MPa and then to the sales gas compressors. The reject nitrogen stream is heated and used to regenerate the molecular sieves. Then the sulphur-rich gas is burnt in a thermal oxidiser. There are four electric motor-driven sales gas compressors each of capacity 1.4 million m^{3} (50 million ft^{3}) per day at standard conditions with a discharge pressure of 55-75 barg. Gas was exported through a 760 mm (30 in) 3 km pipeline to Burton Point where it was delivered into the National Transmission System.

As the production of gas from the offshore field declined so there was no longer a surplus of gas available at Connah's Quay. The Burton Point terminal is now identified by National Grid as an NTS offtake supplying gas to Connah's Quay power station.
