= Point of Ayr Gas Terminal =

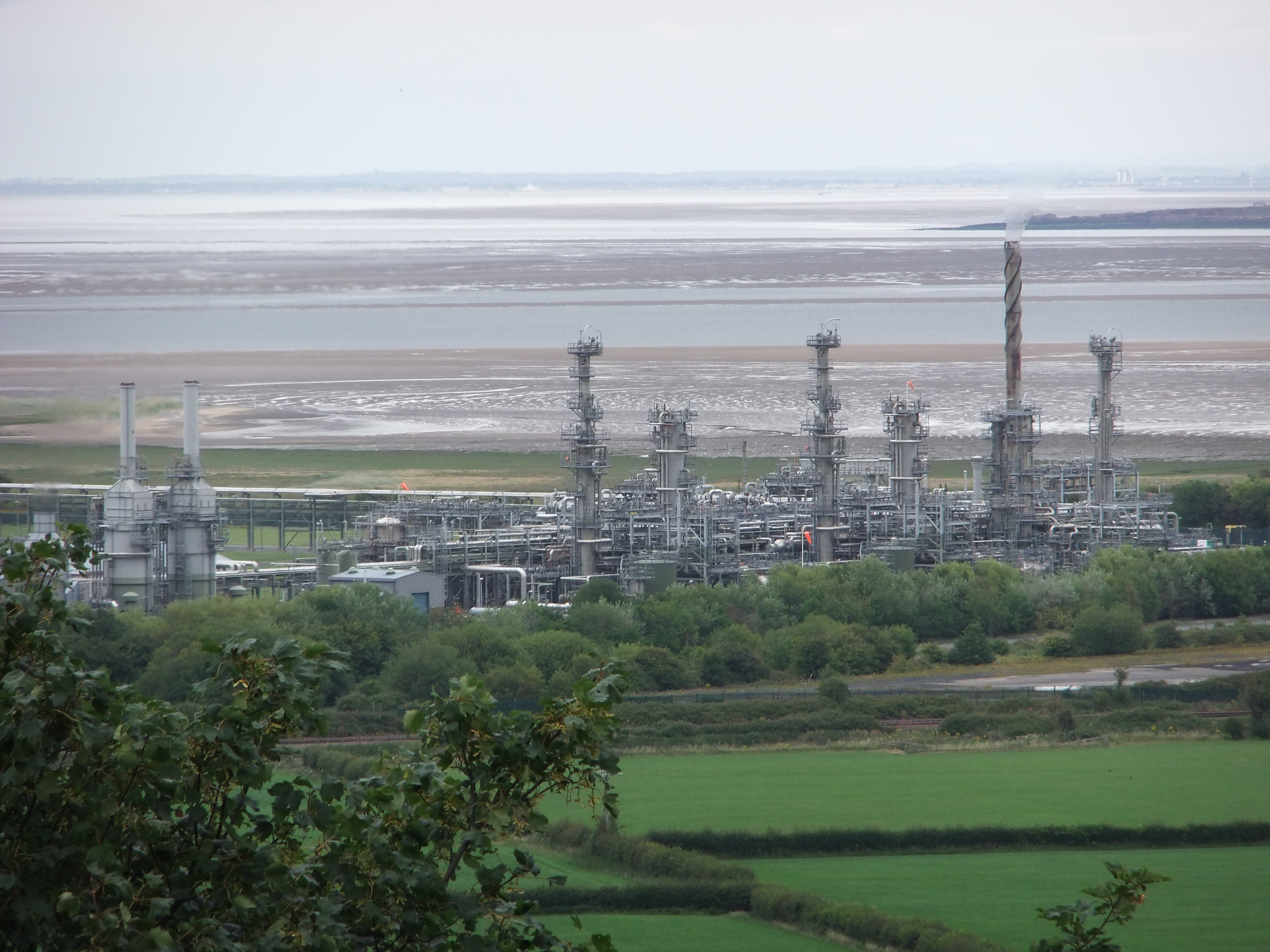

- Location within Wales
- Alternative names: Point of Ayr

General information
- Type: Gas terminal
- Location: Station Road, Talacre, Llanasa, Flintshire, CH8 9RD
- Coordinates: 53.344888°N 3.323253°W
- Completed: 1995
- Owner: eni Liverpool Bay Operating Company Ltd

Technical details
- Floor area: 95 acres (380,000 m^{2})

The Point of Ayr Gas Terminal is a gas terminal situated on the Point of Ayr in Flintshire, Wales. It takes gas from eni's Liverpool Bay Development.

== History ==
The site is owned by eni Liverpool Bay Operating Company Ltd, a subsidiary of eni UK Ltd. It is built near the site of a former colliery, which closed in August 1996. Approval for the site was given in February 1993, to be constructed by Hamilton Oil (of Denver, USA). BHP bought Hamilton Oil in 1991. The amount of gas to be brought onshore would be enough to provide electricity for half of Wales. Construction took place in 1994. eni bought BHP Billiton's interest in the Liverpool Bay Development in April 2014.

The gas comes from the Triassic Ormskirk Sandstone Formation.

== Operation ==
It is situated just off the A548, next to the North Wales Coast Line and run by eni Liverpool Bay Operating Company Ltd, with offices at Llaneurgain House at Northop Country Park. The nearest town is Prestatyn, to the west.

The plant has a capacity to treat 8.5 million cubic metres (300 million cubic feet) per day at standard conditions of sour gas from offshore. The gas is brought ashore via a 20 in (51 cm) diameter, 33 km (21 miles) pipeline. The plant separates methanol (used for hydrate inhibition), water and condensate from the gas stream. The gas is sweetened with an amine solvent to remove sulphur compounds down to 3.3 ppm hydrogen sulphide and 35 ppm mercaptans. The hydrocarbon dew-point of the gas is reduced by mechanical refrigeration to a quality suitable for pipeline transportation. The treated gas is piped to Connah's Quay Power Station at 30 bar via a 24 in (61 cm) diameter, 27 km (17 miles) pipeline. Any gas surplus to the fuel requirements of the power station is further treated and delivered to the Burton Point terminal of the National Transmission System (NTS).

In the series of fields, the Douglas field is only an oil field.

== Douglas Complex ==
The Douglas Complex is 24 km (15 mi) from the Welsh coast. It is powered by two 42MW gas turbines. Gas is part-processed at the complex.

== Gas fields ==
These were previously owned by BHP Petroleum Great Britain plc, LASMO (ULX) Ltd and a small amount by Centrica. The Centrica share was purchased by Eni UK Ltd, and the Lasmo share was owned by Eni ULX Ltd. eni now owns 100% of this development after it purchased BHP Billiton's shares in April 2014.

=== Hamilton ===
Discovered in June 1990. Production started in February 1997.

=== Hamilton North ===
Discovered in May 1991. Production started in December 1995.

=== Hamilton East ===
Discovered in December 1993.

=== Lennox ===
Discovered in July 1992. Production started in February 1996. Also an oil field. Situated just off Southport.
