= Deeside Power Station =

Gas-fired power station in Wales

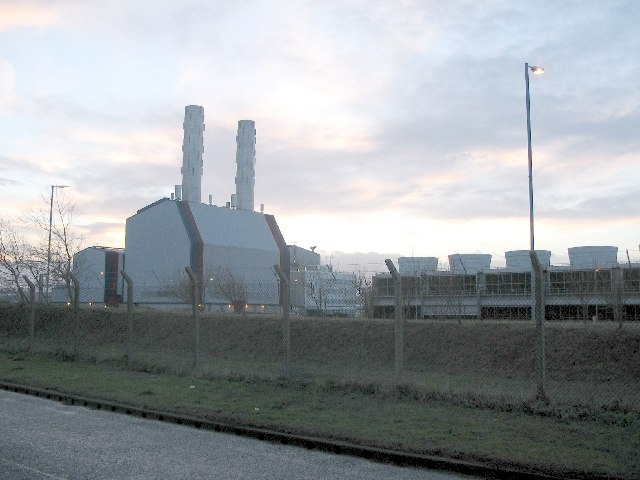
- Country: United Kingdom
- Location: Deeside Industrial Park, Flintshire
- Coordinates: 53°14′00″N 3°03′17″W
- Status: Operational
- Commission date: 1994
- Construction cost: £200 million
- Owner: Triton Power
- Combined cycle?: Yes

Power generation
- Nameplate capacity: 498 MW

External links
- Commons: Related media on Commons

Deeside Power Station is a power station on the Deeside Industrial Park to the north of Connah's Quay in Flintshire, Wales. Constructed as a 498 MWe combined-cycle gas plant, it is now used to provide inertial response and reactive power services to the grid.

It is a mile from the 1,420 MW Connah's Quay Power Station, owned by Uniper. The power stations are separated by the Flintshire Bridge.

== History ==
Deeside power station is sited on land of a former British Steel Corporation steelworks, and was commissioned in November 1994, costing £200 million. Built by Alstom for National Power, it is now owned by Triton Power.

In April 2002, 250 MW of capacity at the plant was mothballed when the price of electricity dropped. The station resumed full power in October 2003.

In March 2018, the plant was again mothballed, and in January 2020 it was awarded a contract to supply the National Grid with inertial response and reactive power services. Work to repurpose the turbines began in March 2020, with specialist new turbine blocks installed, and the modified plant entered service in 2021. It is believed to be the first conversion of a gas power station to provide standalone grid stability services.

In 2022, part of the building, which housed the Heat Recovery Steam Generator, needed to be deconstructed as part of the power station's transition from a Combined Cycle Gas Turbine (CCGT) configuration to an Open Cycle Gas Turbine (OCGT) configuration.

== Original specification ==
Deeside was constructed as CCGT-type power station running on natural gas. There were two 166 MWe Alstom GT13E2 gas turbines, from which the exhaust gas at 525 °C enters two heat recovery steam generators. The steam from these powered one 176 MWe steam turbine. The terminal voltage on the ABB generators was 16 kV, and this electricity entered the National Grid, via a transformer, at 400 kV. It had a thermal efficiency of 53%. Cooling water for the condenser was taken from the River Dee. The cooling towers were made by Balcke Duerr of Ratingen, Germany. The plant has two chimneys.

== In popular culture ==
The power station can be seen in episode 1 of the BBC's drama series In the Flesh.
