= Buckley railway station =

Railway station in Flintshire, Wales

Buckley Welsh: Bwcle
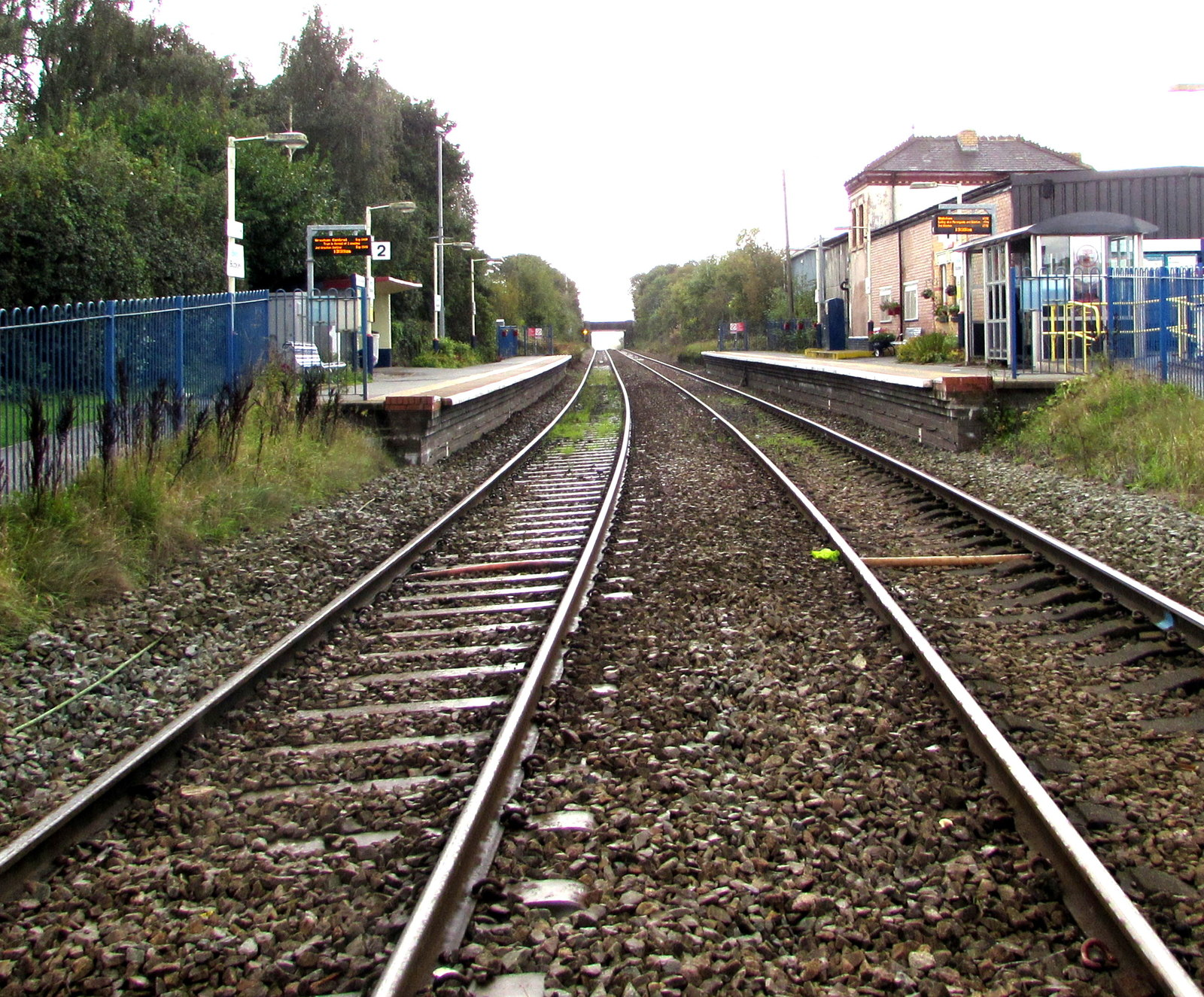

General information
- Location: Buckley, Flintshire; Wales
- Coordinates: 53.163°N 3.056°W
- Grid reference: SJ295633
- Manager: Transport for Wales
- Platforms: 2

Other information
- Station code: BCK
- Classification: DfT category F2

History
- Original company: Wrexham, Mold and Connah's Quay Railway
- Pre-grouping: Great Central Railway

Key dates
- 31 March 1890: Opened as Buckley Junction
- 6 May 1974: Renamed

Passengers
- 2021/22: ▲22,338
- 2022/23: ▲30,328
- 2023/24: ▼26,754
- 2024/25: ▲44,006
- 2025/26: ▲52,304
Location
Notes
- Passenger statistics from the Office of Rail and Road

Buckley railway station serves the town of Buckley in Flintshire, Wales. The station is 8½ miles (14 km) north of Wrexham Central on the Borderlands Line.

The station was known as Buckley Junction until 6 May 1974, when it became Buckley. It is the nearest station to Mold, Flintshire.

== History ==
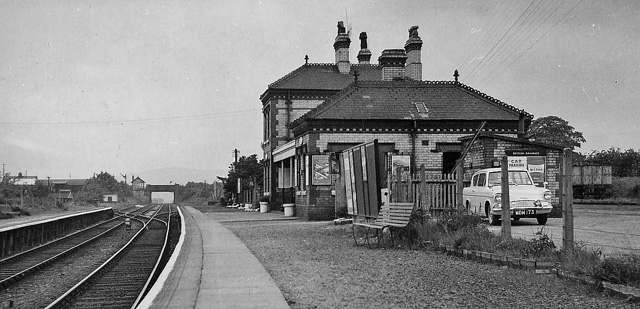
The station in 1961

The first railway in the area was the Buckley Railway, a short (5 mile/8 km long) freight branch linking the town with the River Dee at Connah's Quay. The Wrexham, Mold and Connah's Quay Railway arrived in 1866 from a terminus at Wrexham Exchange alongside the GWR's Wrexham General station and was linked into the Buckley Railway from the outset, eventually taking it over in 1873. Passenger services from the south began soon afterwards, but not to the current station, which dates from 1890, when the "Hawarden Loop" line northwards to Shotton was opened.

Further construction by the Great Central Railway added links to Chester and to Bidston (the current route north) by 1896. The original Buckley Railway line down to the docks at Connah's Quay remained freight-only throughout its life, finally closing in 1965. That left the current line at the station and ran via the original Buckley (Old) station (closed in 1890, and briefly reopened between 1893–95). Few traces of that route now remain.

The station became an unstaffed halt in 1969 and the substantial two-storey main building was subsequently sold off. It remains standing to this day and is now used as industrial premises.

== Facilities ==
The station has no ticket provision, so these must be purchased in advance or on the train. Train running information can be obtained via CIS screens, timetable poster boards or a payphone on platform 2. Step-free access is available to both platforms; there is no footbridge at this station however, only a foot crossing that must be used with care.

== Services ==
The station is served by an hourly service Monday - Saturday (two-hourly in the evenings & bank holidays) southbound to Wrexham Central and northbound to Bidston for connections to Birkenhead and Liverpool stations via the Merseyrail Wirral Line. Connections to Shrewsbury, Cardiff and Birmingham (and beyond) are available at Wrexham General and for the North Wales Coast line at Shotton. On Sundays, there is a train approximately every 90 minutes.

Preceding station	National Rail	Following station
Penyffordd	Transport for Wales; Borderlands Line	Hawarden
	Historical railways	
Hope Exchange; Line open, station closed	Wrexham, Mold and Connah's Quay Railway; Buckley Railway	Connah's Quay; Line and station closed
Hope Exchange	Great Central Railway; Wrexham, Mold and Connah's Quay Railway	Hawarden

== Sources ==
- Butt, R. V. J. (October 1995). The Directory of Railway Stations: details every public and private passenger station, halt, platform and stopping place, past and present (1st ed.). Sparkford: Patrick Stephens Ltd. ISBN 978-1-85260-508-7. OCLC 60251199. OL 11956311M.
