= Wepre Park =

Public park in Flintshire, Wales

Coordinates: 53.2036°N 3.0606°W

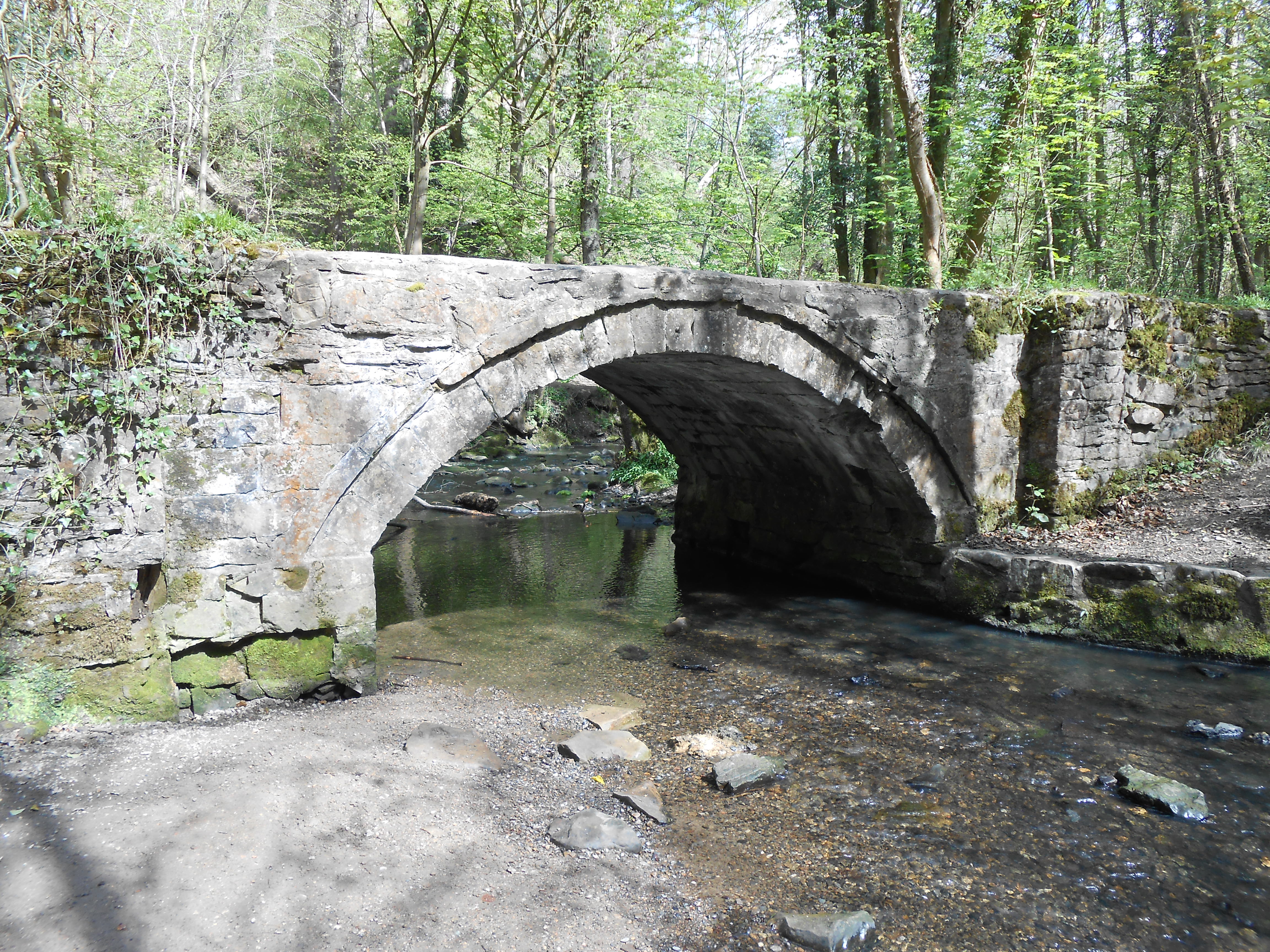
- Photo of Pont Aber
- Interactive map of Wepre Park
- Type: Public park
- Location: Deeside, Wales
- Operator: Flintshire County Council
- Visitors: 200,000
- Status: Open all year
- Website: Wepre Park

Wepre Park (Welsh: Parc Gwepra) is a 160 acres (65 ha) country park near Connah's Quay in Flintshire, Wales. The park is home to Ewloe Castle and contains a playground, outdoor gym, football playing pitches and a visitor centre.

== Etymology ==
The name "Wepre" is thought to be from the Welsh for 'Gwy' and 'Bre' or 'Gwybre' as it was once perhaps known, translated into English as 'Water Hill', although the name 'Wepre' has changed many times over the last 8 centuries.

== History ==
Originally established next to an ancient forest, Wepre woods and estate are described in the Domesday Book, situated within the Hundred of Atiscross, measuring 0.5 leagues. Then owned by St. Werburgh's Abbey in Chester, the estate was sub-leased to a local merchant. Latterly owned by Bishop Owen of St. Asaph, it became part of the estates of the Fitz-Roberts family when his daughter married into the family. As part of the English Civil War, during the siege of Chester the hall was commandeered by a royalist commander of a battery of artillery.

The estate was acquired in 1776 by lead mine owner Edward Jones from Holywell, who demolished and rebuilt Wepre Hall in a Georgian-style. After he died in debt in 1815, his son Major Trevor Owen Jones sold off his other holdings, but retained the majority of the Wepre estate. In 1830 he commissioned Wepre Mill, a corn mill consisting of three stones powered by a 20 feet (6.1 m) water wheel.

Post World War I, the estate was broken up, with the farms sold off and eventually redeveloped from post World War II as modern housing estates, e.g.: Pippins housing estate. Having been commandeered by the British Army during World War II, from the 1950s the Hall served as an old peoples home. In 1960, the residual Wepre Hall estate was acquired by the local council, and the abandoned house demolished. Today the original cellars of the hall still exist beneath the Wepre Park Visitors Centre.

== Facilities ==
The park contains a visitor centre, large playground, outdoor gym, football pitches, fishing ponds, woodland walking, nature trails, toilets and recreation area. The park is popular with dog walkers and includes free car parking.

=== Parkrun ===
A hilly trail parkrun takes place in the park every Saturday morning, the 5 km run passes the waterfall and Rosie Pool and ends outside the visitor centre.

== Wildlife ==
The park is protected as part of Connahs Quay Ponds and Woodlands Site of Special Scientific Interest because it is home to rare fauna and flora including the Great crested newt and badgers, both of which are protected by law.

== Landmarks ==
=== Ewloe castle ===
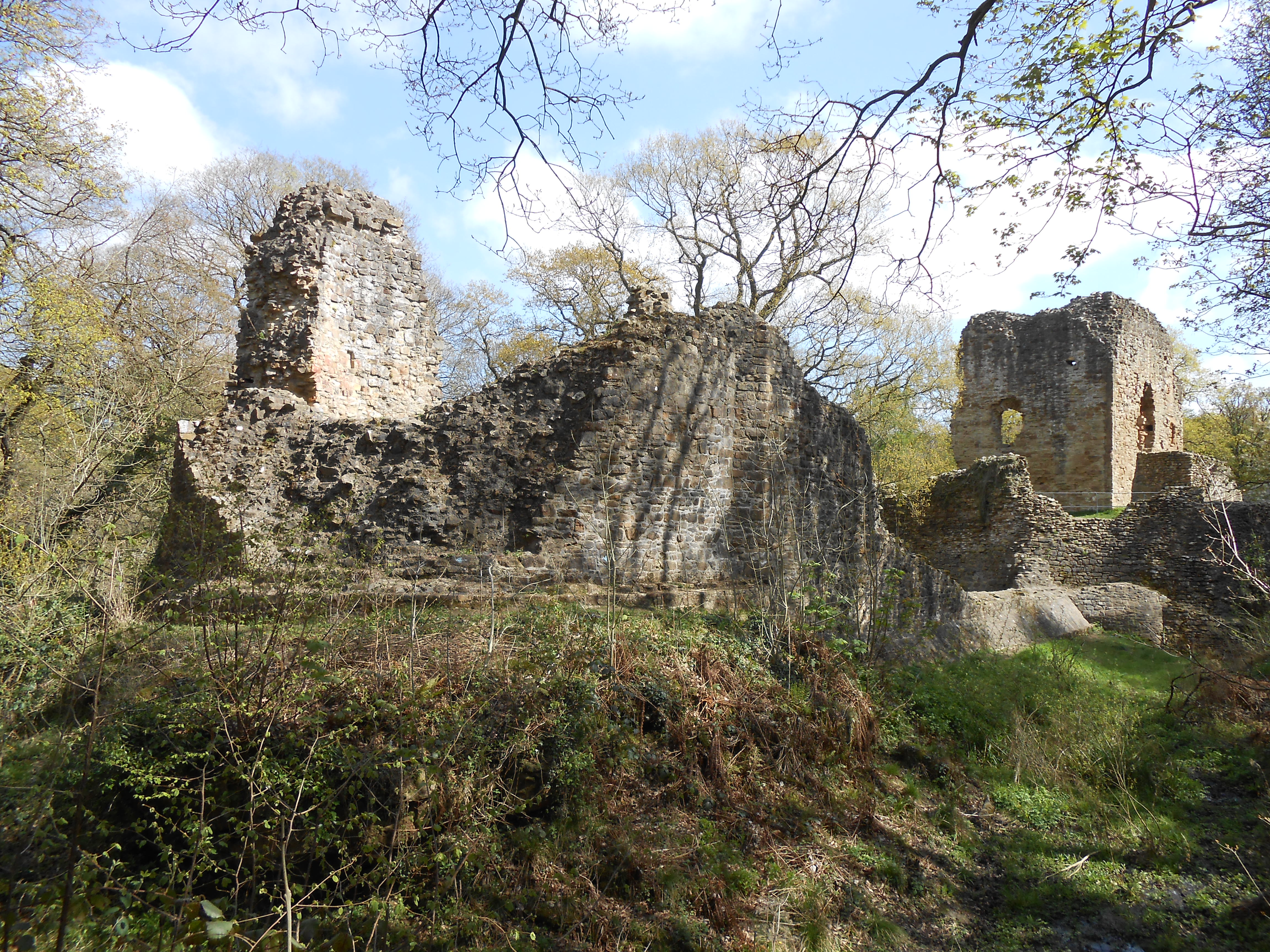
Ewloe Castle

Ewloe Castle (Welsh: Castell Ewlo) is a native Welsh castle near the town of Ewloe in Flintshire, Wales. The castle, which was one of the last fortifications to be built by the sovereign Princes of Wales, was abandoned at the beginning of the invasion of Wales by Edward I in 1277. Its construction, using locally quarried sandstone, appears to have continued piecemeal over many years and may have not been completed. The Welsh sited Ewloe on high ground standing near the Chester road, it maintained a strategic position near the Wales–England border. The castle is located on a steeply sloped promontory within a forested valley. It overlooks the junction of two streams with higher ground to the south. The castle is a 1 km walk from the visitor centre and free to enter. The castle is unique because of its D-shaped keep known as 'The Welsh Tower' and is managed by CADW.

=== Red rocks ===
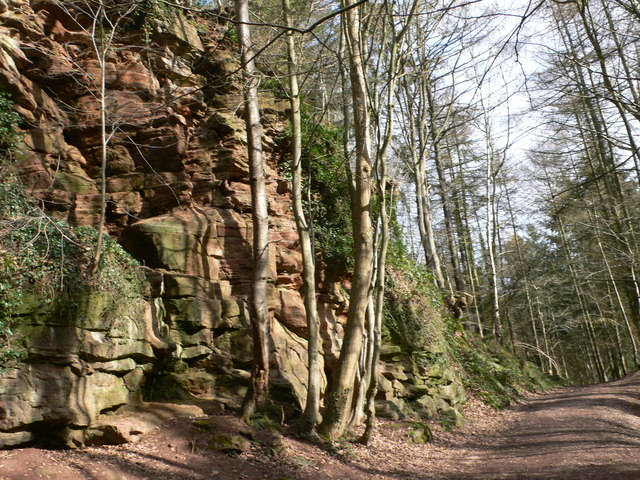
Red Rocks - sandstone outcrop

Red rocks are a visible and striking feature of the park, with much of Ewloe Castle built from it. The rocks have a distinctive red colour, because of the iron content of the sandstone in this region. Much of the iron in the original sands and gravels has rusted in the warm and wet tropical conditions of prehistoric Wales. Red rocks also often indicate the presence of coal and Wepre Park has many small surface pits, dug by hand before the heavy machinery of the Industrial Revolution was invented.

=== Woodland walk ===
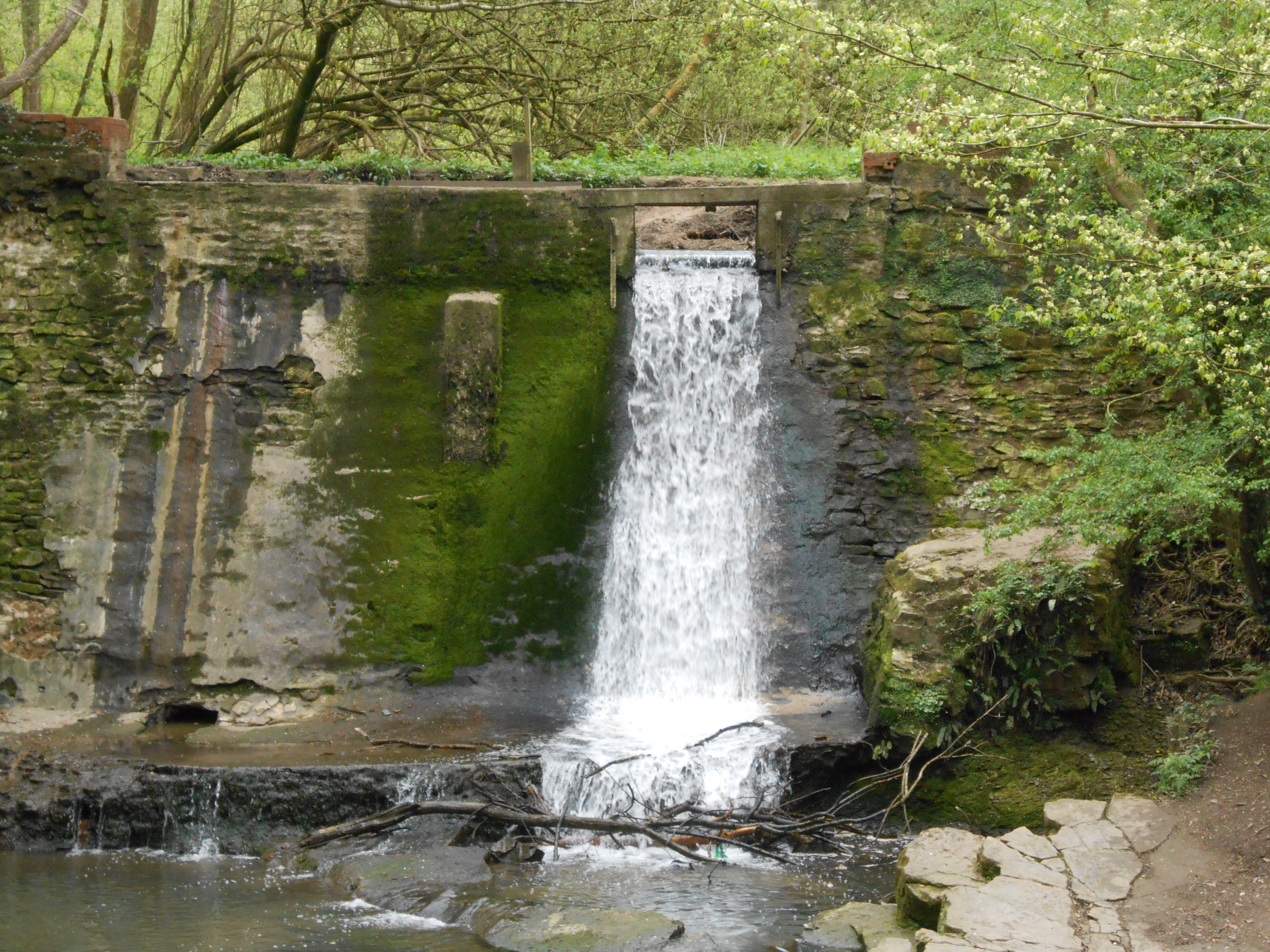
The waterfall

The park encompasses a trail along Wepre brook passing Pont Aber and a waterfall.

=== Waterfall ===
The park contains a waterfall that was originally built to power a small hydroelectric plant which generated electricity for the hall.
