= Connah's Quay High School =

Community secondary school in Flintshire, Wales

- Ysgol Uwchradd Cei Connah

Location
- Golftyn Lane; Connah's Quay, Flintshire, CH5 4BH; Wales
- 53.2230°N 3.0785°W

Information
- Other name: CQHS
- Type: Community secondary school
- Motto: Welsh: Gofalwn (We care)
- Local authority: Flintshire County Council
- Department for Education URN: 401708 Tables
- Head teacher: James Forber
- Teaching staff: 56.0 (on an FTE basis)
- Gender: Mixed
- Age range: 11–16
- Enrolment: 1,060(2021)
- Student to teacher ratio: 18.3
- Language: English
- Website: www.connahsquayhs.org.uk

Connah's Quay High School (CQHS, Welsh: Ysgol Uwchradd Cei Connah) is an 11–16 mixed, English-medium, community comprehensive secondary school in Connah's Quay, Flintshire, Wales. The school has a roll of 992 learners, of whom 120 are in the sixth form. The school underwent significant development in 2002, when a science, English and music wing was built, and then again in 2018, when a new two-storey building replaced the old three-storey structure.

== History ==
Connah's Quay High School is an 11–16 mixed, English-medium, community comprehensive secondary school. The school has a roll of 992 learners, of whom 120 are in the sixth form. The school is one of two schools in North Wales to be part of the iNET Innovation Hub.

== Facilities ==
A £2.3 million science, English and music wing was completed in October 2002, after a two-year project also involving extensions and redevelopment of the existing buildings. When Prince Andrew, Duke of York visited the school to declare the new block officially open, the opening ceremony was interrupted by a fire alarm caused by a hot tea urn.

Connahs Quay High School underwent further modernisation beginning in 2017, with the demolition and complete rebuild of the old food and design wing. The three-storey pre-existing building was demolished, and a new two-storey building erected. The redevelopment was completed by architects Ellis Williams and construction firm Kier Construction in 2018. During the redevelopment, a time capsule was buried on the site, intended to be dug up and opened in 2015.

== Notable alumni ==
- Tom Doran boxer, held the WBC International middleweight title in 2016
- Scott van-der-sluis Love Island Contestant in 2023 UK Tenth Series, US Fifth Series and Love Island Games
- Luke Thomas (born 1993), a celebrity chef, author and entrepreneur
- Drew Parker independent wrestler previously with Big Japan Pro Wrestling
- Wayne Hennessey Footballer who played for the Welsh national football team between 2007 and 2023

== Welsh ==
Welsh Government defines the school as an English-medium secondary school. According to the latest Estyn inspection report, the school was removed from the list of schools needing significant improvement.
