= Ewloe Castle =

Castle in Flintshire, Wales

- Castell Ewloe (Welsh) (Note: Since 2024, Cadw, who maintain the site, use the Welsh name only.)
- Ewloe, Flintshire, Wales
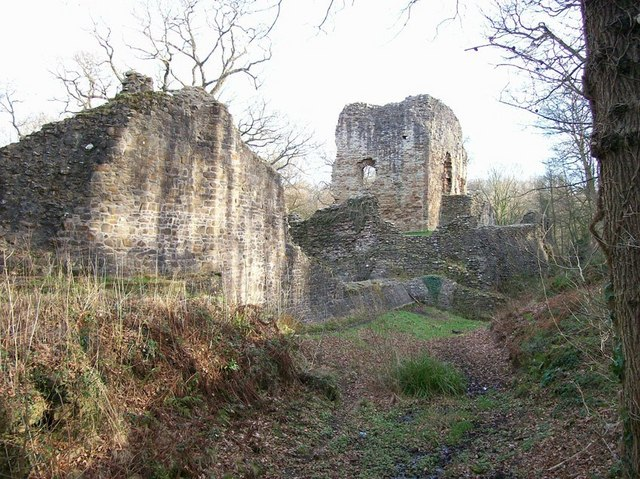
- Ewloe Castle's Welsh keep and southern curtain wall

Site information
- Type: Motte-and-bailey, hillside castle
- Owner: Cadw
- Condition: Ruin
- Website: Castell Ewloe (Cadw)

Location
- Location in Wales
- Location within Wales
- Coordinates: 53.200°N 3.0670°W
- Height: 10 metres (33 ft)

Site history
- Built: 12th–13th century
- Built by: Owain Gwynedd; Llywelyn the Great; Llywelyn ap Gruffudd
- In use: Open to public
- Materials: Sandstone

Listed Building – Grade I

Ewloe Castle (Welsh: Castell Ewloe) is a native Welsh castle built by the Kingdom of Gwynedd near the village of Ewloe in Flintshire, Wales. The castle, which was one of the last fortifications to be built by the native Princes of Wales, was abandoned at the beginning of the invasion of Wales by Edward I in 1277. Using locally quarried sandstone, its construction appears to have continued piecemeal over many years and may have not been completed. On taking the castle, the English Crown gave it little military value and allowed it to fall into ruin.

Ewloe was sited on high ground within Tegeingl, a cantref in the Perfeddwlad, the lands of north-east Wales. Standing near the Chester road, it maintained a strategic position near the Wales–England border. The castle is on a steeply sloped promontory within a forested valley. It overlooks the junction of two streams with higher ground to the south.

== Layout ==
Ewloe Castle combines features from both motte-and-bailey and enclosure castles. An asymmetrical curtain wall—with parapets—encloses two courtyards. A rock-cut neck ditch defends the southern side of the castle. In the upper triangular inner ward is a D-shaped tower known as the "Welsh keep". This stands on a stone outcrop that forms the motte; it has a stone revetment around its base (a basic chemise). The lower outer ward is enclosed by two separate sections of wall that meet at a circular fortified tower, which stands upon a rocky knoll. As the curtain walls are not joined together, ladders would have had to be used to reach their parapets.

No gateways connected the inner ward to the outer courtyard. Access into Ewloe Castle was entirely via wooden ramps. The outer ward had several wooden buildings. An external defensive rampart occupies the higher ground to the south of the castle above the neck ditch.

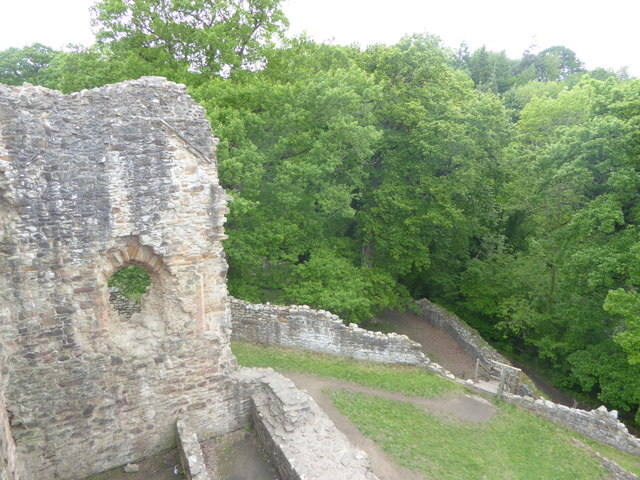
View from the "Welsh Keep" into the castle's upper ward

Within the inner ward is a D-shaped (or horseshoe-shaped) tower known as the "Welsh Keep". Although a flight of stairs leads up to a first-floor gateway—a similarity shared with contemporary military architecture, the shape of the tower does not conform with keeps of the later Plantagenet period. D-shaped towers usually projected out from a wall or gatehouse but at Ewloe, the castle builders placed the tower/keep on a motte in the upper ward surrounded by its curtain wall. This feature has precedence in Welsh military architecture. Llywelyn the Great built a similar D-shaped tower at Castell y Bere at Llanfihangel-y-Pennant in Gwynedd in the 1220s.

The tower's outer walls—which are 2 m (6 ft 7 in) at their base—rose to about 11 m (36 ft). They were higher than the upper storey to protect its pitched roof from projectiles. A parapet ran around the top of the tower. Spaces in the stonework show where storage slots were placed in the upper roof spaces. The tower had a single first-floor hall that stood above a lower ground-floor chamber. Defensive arrowslits were placed on the curved sides of the tower. The flat side, which overlooks the outer ward, has a Romanesque window.

== History ==
=== Construction ===
Ewloe was formerly thought to have been built around 1257 by Llywelyn ap Gruffudd, it is now thought Ewloe was started much earlier by Llywelyn's grandfather, Llywelyn ab Iorwerth. Various periods have been put forward for its construction, including 1213–18 or 1221–37. An earlier fortification might have already existed on this site in Ewloe Woods following the victory of Owain Gwynedd, prince of Wales in the Battle of Ewloe against the forces of Henry II in 1157. If construction commenced in the 1210s, Ewloe may have been a factor in prompting Ranulf de Blondeville, Earl of Chester, to normalise relations with Llywelyn ab Iorwerth. After 1218, both men remained allies until the Earl of Chester's death in 1237.

=== Recapture and refurbishment ===
During protracted legal disputes over control of the marcher lordship of Mold in the early 1240s, Ewloe was used as a base for failed negotiations between Llywelyn's son, Dafydd ap Llywelyn, and officials of Henry III of England which led to war between 1244 and 1246. After Dafydd ap Llywelyn's defeat, Ewloe appears to have been abandoned by the Welsh when English authority was re-established in this part of north-east Wales.

Ewloe was recaptured and refurbished by Llywelyn ap Gruffudd during his forces' reconquest of the Perfeddwlad in 1256–57. It again provided the backdrop for negotiations between the Welsh and the English in 1259 and 1260.

=== Abandonment ===
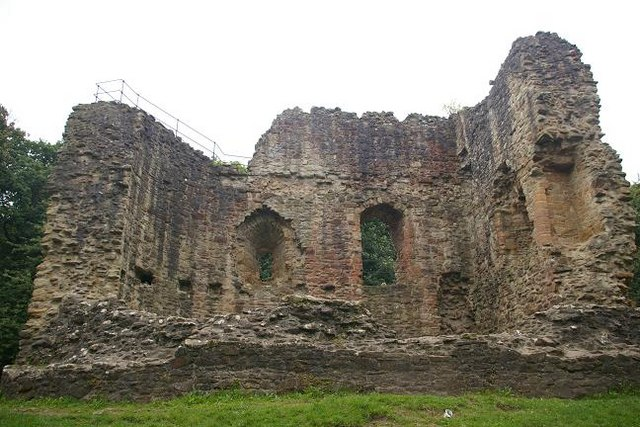
Surviving part of the "Welsh Keep"

In 1276, Edward I began the first Welsh War by marching his forces out of the castle at Chester and up the west coast of the Dee Estuary. After an advanced base was established at Flint (a day's travel from Chester), building work immediately began on Flint Castle. Ewloe is not mentioned in the war chronicles of 1276–77 but the presence of what appears to be a siegework outside the castle may suggest it was besieged. Ewloe had no military value to Edward I because his strategic castles at Flint and Rhuddlan could be provisioned by sea.

The last contemporary references to the Ewloe Castle are in the Chester Plea Rolls that mentions a report sent by the Justice of Chester to Edward II in 1311. It is regarding the history of the manor at Ewloe from the middle of the 12th century. The rolls record that by 1257 Llywelyn ap Gruffudd had regained Ewloe from the English and 'strengthened' a castle in the wood, noting in 1311 that much of the castle was still standing.

The castle was ruinous by the late medieval period. Much of the dressed stone work from its curtain walls and keep had been removed for construction material around Mold and Connah's Quay.

== Preservation ==
Ewloe Castle, which is a Grade I listed building, is incorporated within Wepre Park; a country park managed by Flintshire County Council. The castle is under the care of Cadw—the national heritage agency for Wales. It can be reached by footpaths through Wepre Woods. Public access is free.

In November 2009, the castle was among five lots of farmland and woodland put up for sale by Flintshire County Council. The local authority stressed Ewloe and the site it occupies were protected from any development. It was sold at auction to an anonymous farmer along with 24 acres (9.7 ha) of surrounding land for £122,000.

Since 2024, Cadw have used the Welsh name Castell Ewloe in English, as part of an effort to standardise the names in both languages.

== See also ==
- List of castles in Wales
- Ewloe Castle, Curious Clwyd
- Images of Ewloe Castle
