= St Mark's Church, Connah's Quay =

Coordinates: 53.2212°N 3.0637°W

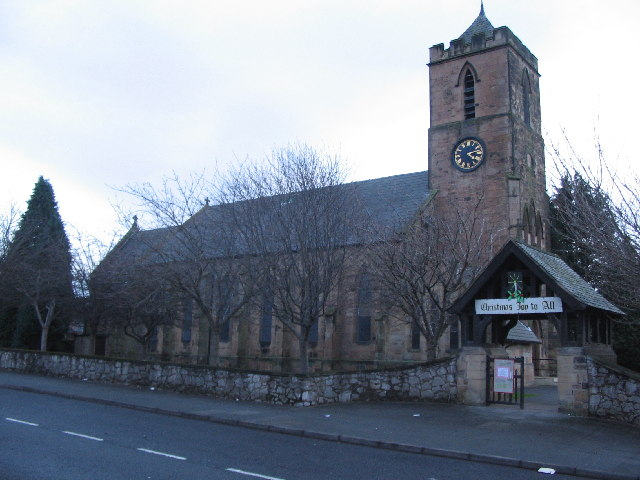
- St Mark's Church, Connah's Quay, from the northwest
- St Mark's Church, Connah's Quay
- OS grid reference: SJ 290 698
- Location: Connah's Quay, Flintshire
- Country: Wales
- Denomination: Church in Wales
- Website: St Mark's Church, Connah's Quay

History
- Status: Parish church
- Dedication: Saint Mark
- Consecrated: 13 August 1837

Architecture
- Functional status: Active
- Architect(s): John Lloyd, John Douglas
- Architectural type: Church
- Style: Gothic Revival
- Groundbreaking: 1836
- Completed: 1933

Specifications
- Capacity: 200

Administration
- Province: Church in Wales
- Diocese: St Asaph
- Archdeaconry: Wrexham
- Deanery: Hawarden
- Parish: Connah's Quay

Clergy
- Vicar: Rev. A. Mayes

St Mark's Church, Connah's Quay is in the town of Connah's Quay, Flintshire, Wales. It is an active Anglican church in the mission area of Borderlands, the archdeaconry of Wrexham and the diocese of St Asaph. The church is the parish church for Connah's Quay and the mother church of St David's Church, Connah's Quay. It is designated as a Grade II listed building by Cadw. The new Vicar, Rev'd Alexier Mayes, was licensed in April 2018.

== History ==
St Mark's was built in 1836–37 to a design by John Lloyd. The church then consisted of a nave with a small apse and a tower at the west end. Between 1876 and 1878 the Chester architect John Douglas added the chancel and refitted the church. The choir vestry was built in 1933 with stone from the former Kelsterton Brewery. The lych gates had been built in 1917 but in 1974–75 they were moved towards the church when a lay-by was constructed. At this time a memorial garden was laid out and gravestones were moved. It is believed that the clock by J. Benson of London was installed in 1837. This was repaired and refurbished in 1991 by JB Joyce & Co of Whitchurch. The bells which had been donated in 1891 were removed in the 1990s because they had become unsafe.

== Fittings and furniture ==
The font at the front of the church dates from 1876. The pulpit is made from carved Caen stone and dates from the same period, as does the lectern. There is a portable Nave Altar used at most services, which is moved for weddings and funerals. The original reredos dating from 1878 was covered up - the current reredos was painted in 1924 and installed as a gift from the Choir in memory of the Fallen from Connah's Quay following the Great War. The organ was built by Whiteley Brothers of Chester in 1879. It was renovated in 1974 and restored in 2000. The Memorial Doors in the gallery were given in 2000 in memory of the deceased of the parish. In the church is a monument dated 1839 by William Spence.

== External features ==
In 1917 a lych gate was built in Arts and Crafts style in memory of a previous vicar of the church. It is in sandstone with a timber superstructure. The lych gate is designated by Cadw as a Grade II listed building.

== Services ==
The Parish Church holds an 8:00am Said Holy Eucharist, an 11:00am Parish Eucharist, at which the choir are present, and a 6:00pm service run by Golftyn Chapel. There is also a Holy Eucharist service every Thursday morning at 10:00am.

== See also ==
- List of church restorations, amendments and furniture by John Douglas
