= Offshore Storage Installation (Liverpool Bay) =

Barge in Liverpool Bay, England

Coordinates: 53.818°N 3.621°W

The Offshore Storage Installation is a barge which is permanently anchored in Liverpool Bay, England, and receives oil from the Douglas Complex of oil platforms in the Irish Sea by way of pipelines under the sea. The facility thus serves as a floating oil terminal, and is capable of holding 870,000 barrels of oil, which can then be transferred to tanker vessels as necessary. The OSI is double-skinned, and is protected by an 800-metre exclusion zone, which is monitored 24 hours a day by radar and a high-powered patrol vessel.

The facility is crewed by a complement of 14, consisting of operators and technicians, plus two catering personnel and an Offshore Installation Manager (OIM).

A system mounted in the OSI's mooring buoy monitors the integrity of the installation's nine anchoring cables.

== See also ==
- List of oil fields
- Geology of England
- Oil platform
