= St David's Church, Connah's Quay =

Coordinates: 53.212°N 3.064°W

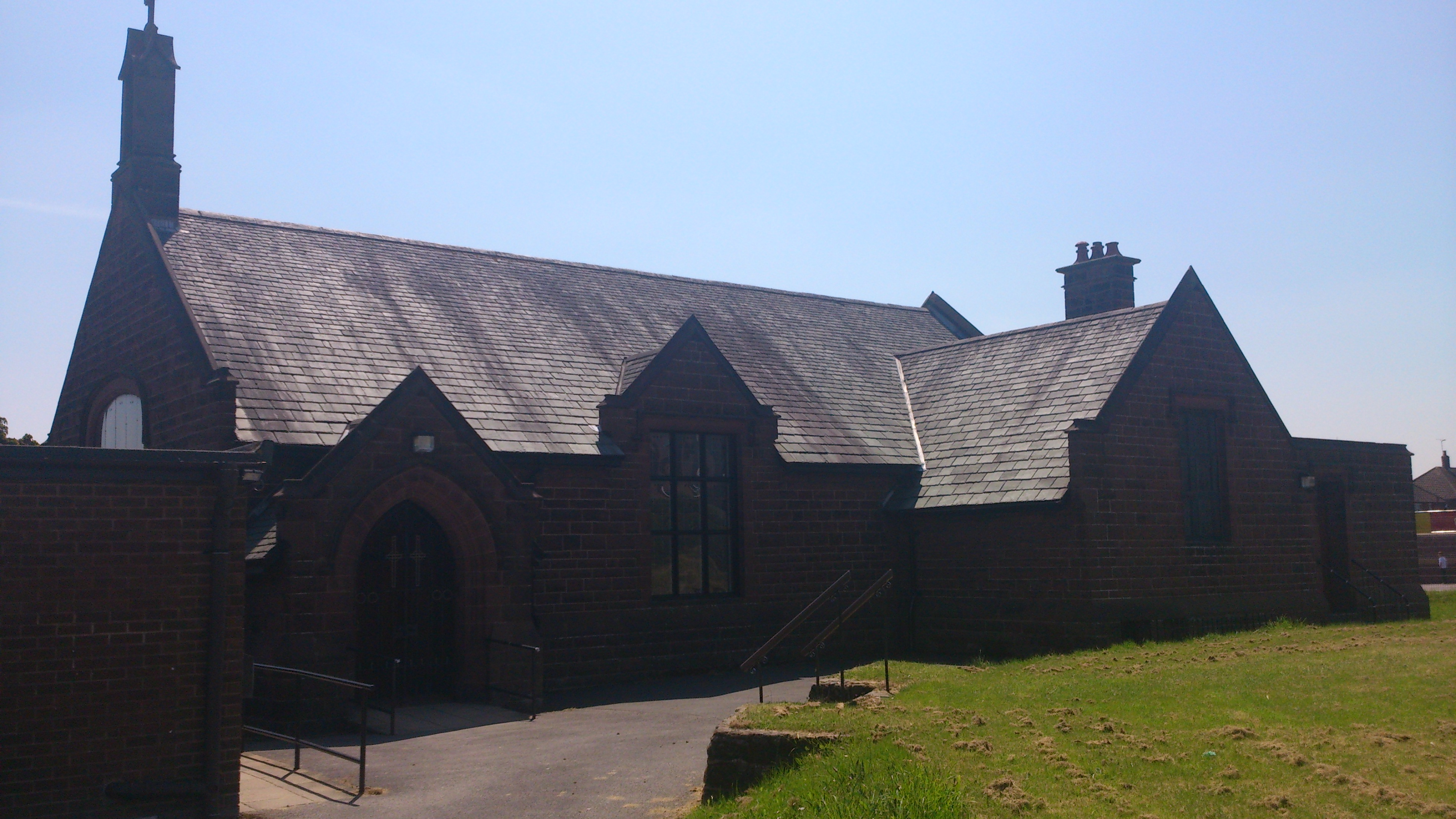
- St David's Church, Connah's Quay
- Location: Connah's Quay, Flintshire
- Country: Wales
- Denomination: Anglican
- Website: St David's Church, Connah's Quay

History
- Status: Parish church
- Dedication: St David

Architecture
- Functional status: Active
- Architectural type: Church
- Groundbreaking: 21 March 1914

Specifications
- Capacity: 100

Administration
- Province: Church in Wales
- Diocese: St Asaph
- Archdeaconry: Wrexham
- Deanery: Hawarden
- Parish: Connah's Quay

Clergy
- Vicar: Rev A. Mayes

St David's Church, Connah's Quay is in the town of Connah's Quay, Flintshire, Wales . It is an active Anglican church in the Deanery of Hawarden, the archdeaconry of Wrexham and the diocese of St Asaph. The church is the daughter Church of St Mark's Church, Connah's Quay.

== History ==
The church was built in 1914. The foundation stone was laid on 21 March 1914. The first service was held in the church in January 1915. The building was initially intended to be the church hall and the main church building was to be built in front of the field. However, the parish ran out of money and the hall, which was built of Ellesmere Sandstone with the inside lined with Ruabon brick, was converted into the church and a small hall built next to it, which is now known as the institute. The field is used for Church Fetes and other events.

== Fittings and furniture ==
The church was re-vamped in 2004, for the ninetieth anniversary and to bring it up to code regarding health and safety regulations. A new nave altar was installed and the steps inside were altered to be smaller. Communion is now taken at the nave altar on Sunday mornings and at the High Altar on Wednesday mornings. In 2007 the church upgraded the seating and now boasts over 100 comfortable chairs for the congregation.

== Services ==
The church holds a Family Eucharist every Sunday morning at 9.30am and a Holy Eucharist at 10.am on Wednesdays. A monthly Messy Church and Film Clubs take place on two of the four Saturdays every month. The church is also hosting an Alpha course at the moment led by the Vicar. The new Vicar for Connah's Quay, the Rev Alexier Mayes, was licensed in April 2018.

== Gallery ==
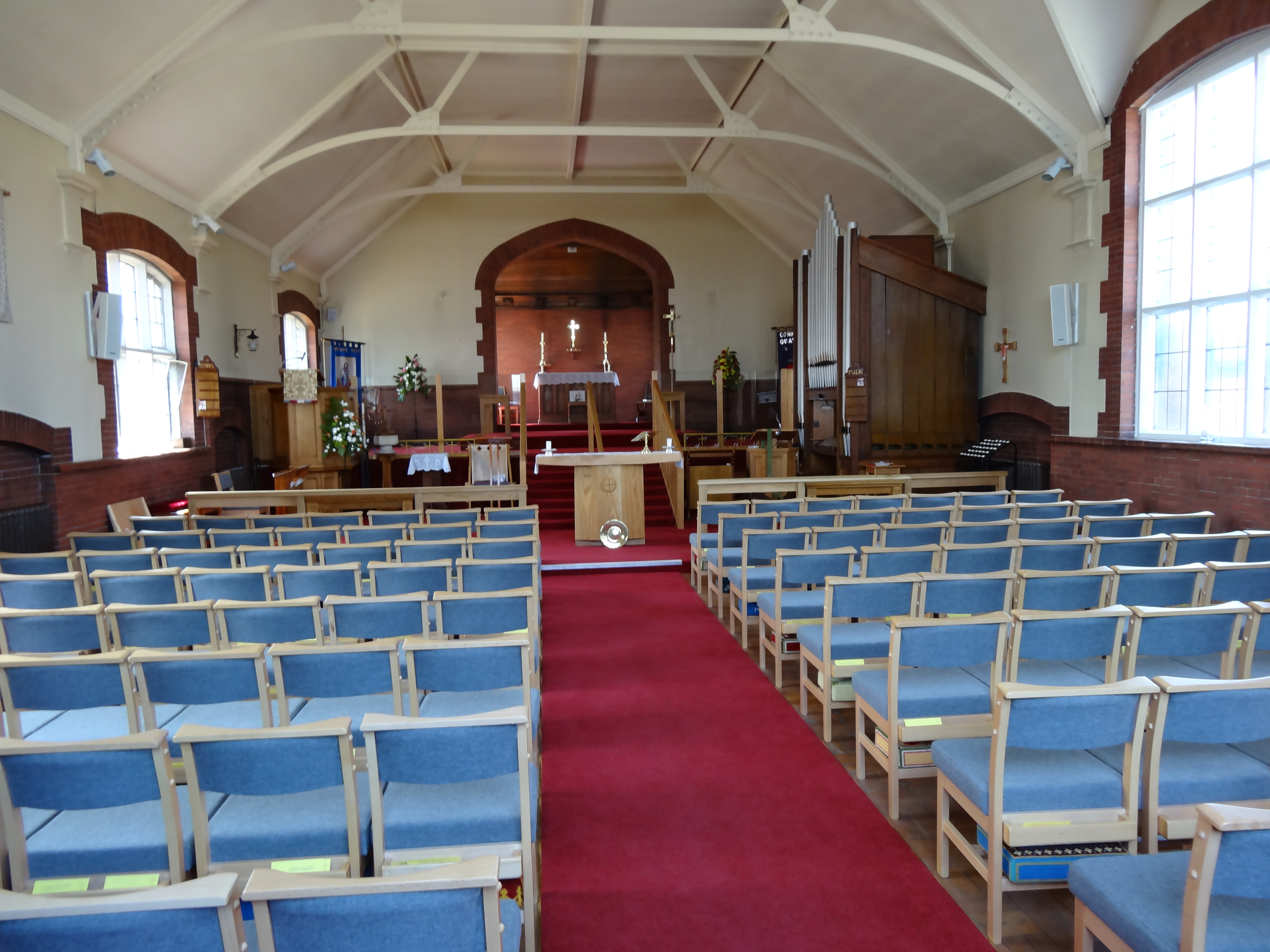
Inside of St David's Church, Connah's Quay, looking towards the Altar.

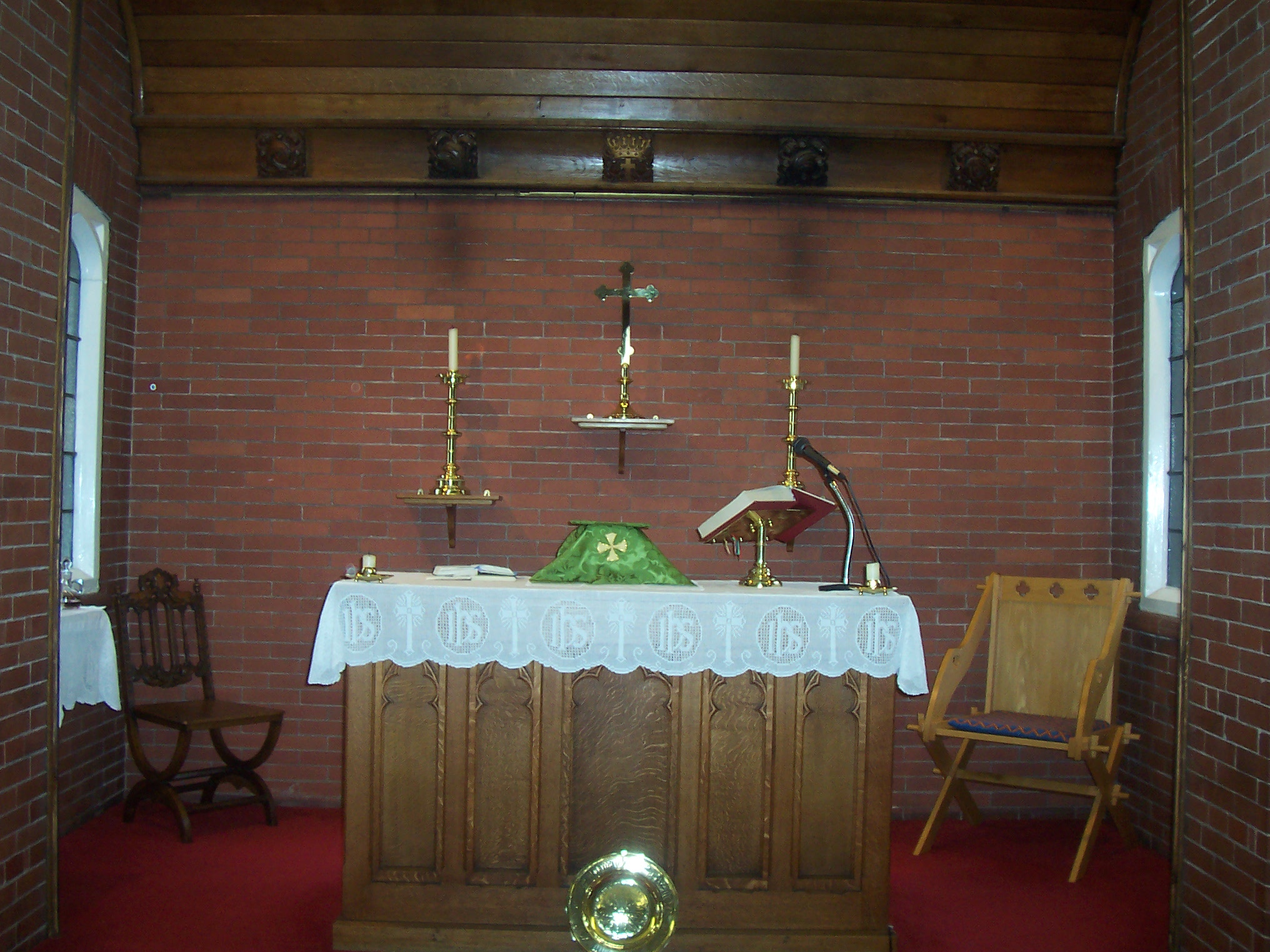
The High Altar set up for Wednesday morning Eucharist.
