= Douglas Complex =

Oil field and complex of oil platforms

Coordinates: 53.5380°N 3.5768°W

Douglas Field
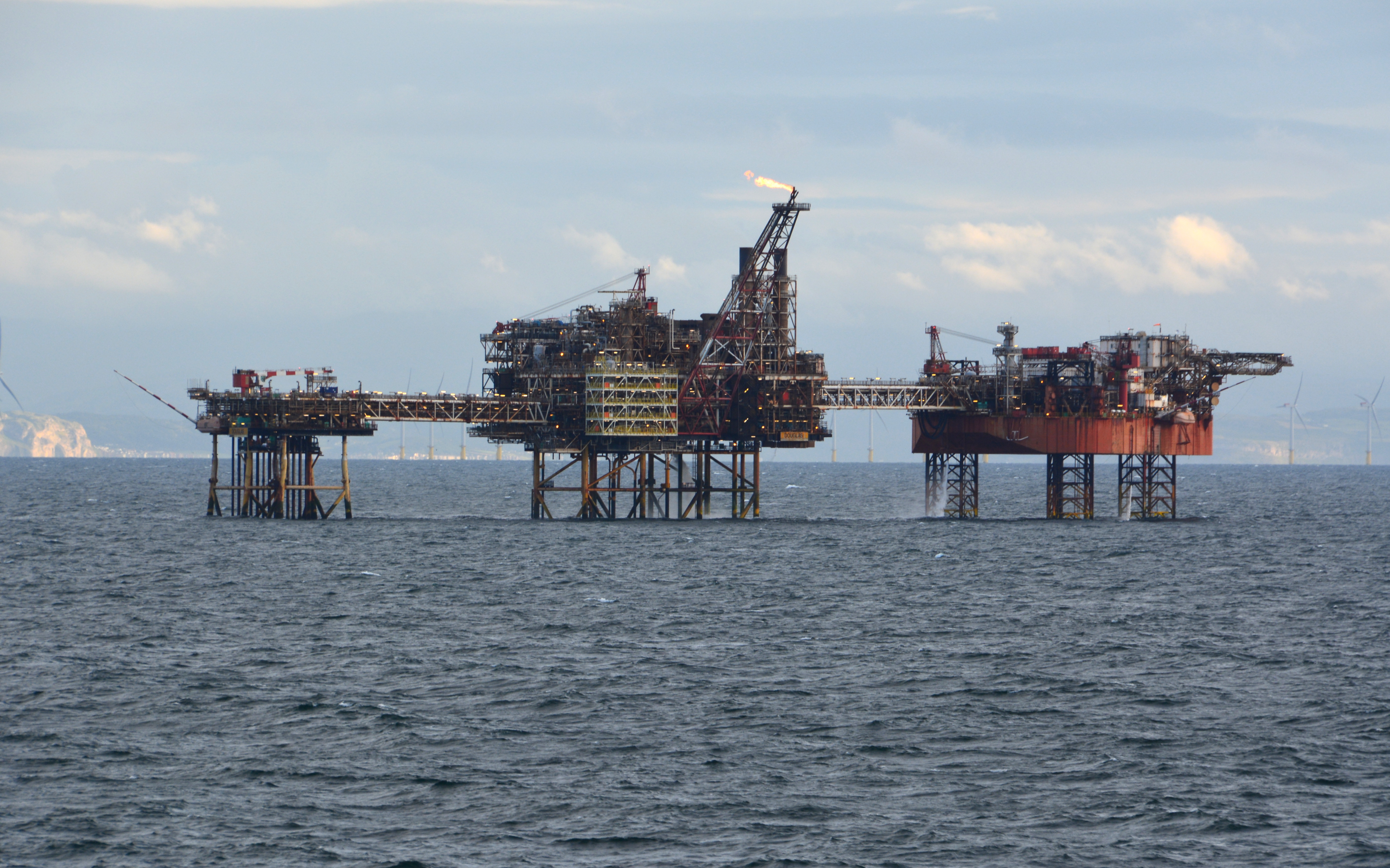
- Douglas Oil Complex in the Irish Sea 15 miles off North Wales

- Location within North Sea
- Country: United Kingdom
- Region: East Irish Sea Basin
- Location/block: UK Block 110/13
- Offshore/onshore: offshore
- Operator: Eni

Field history
- Discovery: 1990
- Start of production: February 1996

Production
- Estimated oil in place: 225 million barrels (~3.07×10^{7} t)
- Producing formations: Triassic Helsby Sandstone Formation

The Douglas Complex is a 54-metre (177 ft) high system of three linked platforms in the Irish Sea, 24 kilometres (15 mi) off the North Wales coast. The Douglas oil field was discovered in 1990, and production commenced in 1996. Now operated by Eni, the complex consists of the wellhead platform, which drills into the seabed, a processing platform, which separates oil, gas and water, and thirdly an accommodation platform, which is composed of living quarters for the crew. This accommodation module was formerly the Morecambe Flame jack-up drilling rig.

The Douglas Complex is also the control hub for other platforms in the area and provides power for all platforms. It also offers recreational, catering and medical facilities for up to 80 personnel. Oil from the Lennox, Hamilton, and Hamilton North unmanned satellite platforms is received and blended at the complex.

Fluids from the Lennox installation via the gas pipeline are treated on the Douglas installation in the 3-phase (oil, gas and produced water) Lennox Production Separator. Following separation, gas flows to the Offgas Compressor suction manifold. Oil is directed to the Oil Stripper where the liquid is stripped of sour gas using a counter-current flow of stripping gas. Produced water from the separator is directed to the Produced Water Hydrocyclones where hydrocarbon liquids are removed prior to overboard disposal. Well fluids from the Douglas Wellhead tower are treated in the 3-phase Douglas Production Separator. Gas flows to the Offgas Compressor suction manifold and hydrocarbon liquids are directed to the Oil Stripper, and water to hydrocyclones as described above. Oil from the Oil Stripper is pumped by the Oil Transfer Pumps via Fiscal metering to the Main Oil Transfer Pumps to tanker loading. Gas from the Oil Stripper is compressed and sent to the Offgas Compressor.

Gas is sent through a pipeline 33.5-kilometre (20.8 mi) long to a processing plant at Point of Ayr, in Flintshire, North Wales. After processing, almost the entire output is sold to E.ON to fire the combined cycle gas turbine power station at Connah's Quay, on Deeside, in Flintshire. Oil produced in Liverpool Bay is sent through another pipeline, 17 km long, to the Offshore Storage Installation, a permanently anchored barge which acts as a floating oil terminal, capable of holding 870 thousand barrels (~1.2×10^{5} t) of oil. From the floating terminal oil is transferred to tankers approximately once every month.

== See also ==
- List of oil fields
- Geology of the United Kingdom
- Oil platform
- Point of Ayr
