= Connah's Quay =

Town and community in Flintshire, Wales

Connah's Quay: Welsh: Cei Connah
- Town and community
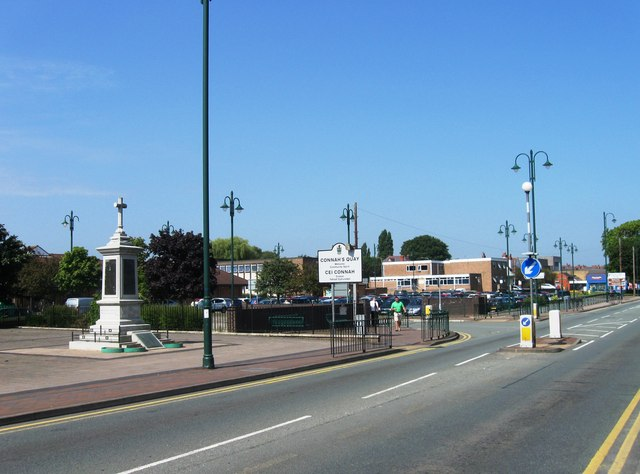
- High Street, Connah's Quay

- Location within Flintshire
- Population: 16,771 (2021)
- OS grid reference: SJ295695
- Community: Connah's Quay
- Principal area: Flintshire
- Preserved county: Clwyd
- Country: Wales
- Sovereign state: United Kingdom
- Post town: Deeside
- Postcode district: CH5
- Dialling code: 01244
- Police: North Wales
- Fire: North Wales
- Ambulance: Welsh
- UK Parliament: Alyn and Deeside
- Senedd Cymru – Welsh Parliament: Alyn and Deeside, North Wales
- Website: Council website
- List of places UK Wales Flintshire 53.218°N 3.057°W Map of the community

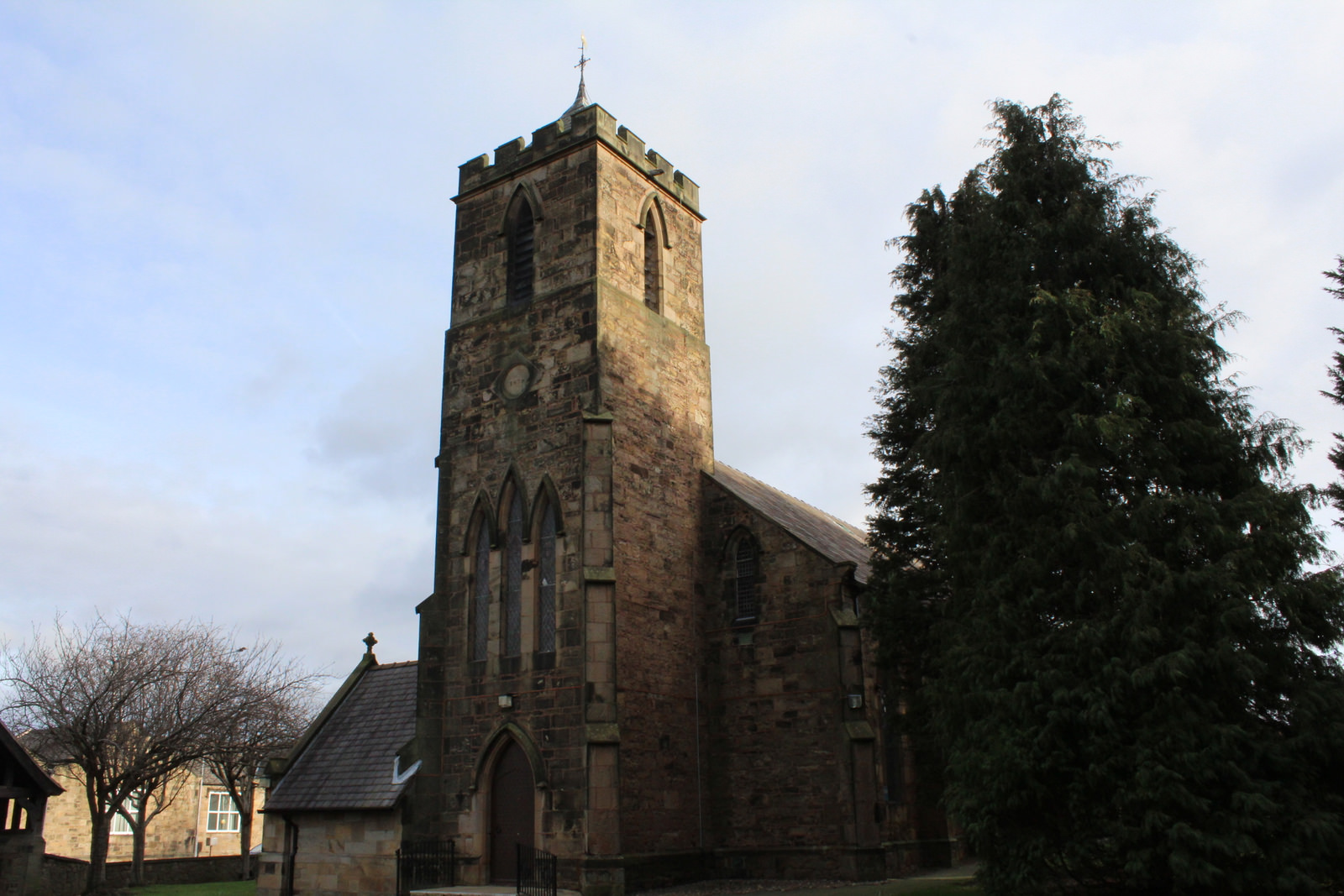
St Mark's Church

Connah's Quay (Welsh: Cei Connah), known locally as "The Quay" and formerly known as Wepre, is a town and community in Flintshire, Wales on the River Dee and next to the border with England. With a population of 16,771, it is the largest town in Flintshire. The town is also part of the wider Deeside conurbation and is contiguous with Shotton, Flint and Buckley.

It is located 6 miles (9.7 km) west of Chester and 19 miles (31 km) south of Liverpool also close to the Wirral. Just south of the River Dee and town is the Deeside Industrial Park. Additionally, Tata has a steelworks on the town's border on the north bank of the River Dee. Wepre Woods, an ancient woodland in the town, is controlled by Flintshire County Council's Ranger Service and includes Ewloe Castle which dates from the 13th century.

== Etymology ==
Connah's Quay is a relatively recent name, with the settlement (and nearby wood) first recorded in the Domesday Book of 1086 under the name Wepre. The use of this name would continue into the modern era, as tithe maps record the conurbation of homes and farms as "the Wepre township" (with Golftyn Township to the north). Thomas Morgan stated that this name was a corruption of the ancient Wybre (Gwybre or Gwybra in Modern Welsh). This name is derived from the Welsh place-name elements "Gwy" (a common element in Welsh hydronymy, usually denoting a river) and "Bre" (hill). This older name is still found in various usage across Connah's Quay, most notably in Wepre Park.

The town's English name dates from the late eighteenth century, when a number of new quays were built for the New Cut channel to the sea (construction in 1737). These quays included a pier named New Quay in 1773 and one in the surrounding area named Connas Quay in 1791. Only the latter name has survived today as Connah's Quay, named after James Connah (1732–87) who lived at the Quay House and was a member of the local industrialist Connah family. This name is also the source of the town's official name in Welsh, Cei Connah, a partial calque of the English name.

Another theory is that the name came from a former landlord of the "Old Quay House", a public house which is still on the docks in what is now the west side of the town.

== History ==
The earliest recorded settlements date from the time of the Domesday Book, listed as 'Wepre', part of the Hundred of Ati's Cross, Cheshire. The total population was 6 households. Wepre Woods are also recorded, measuring ½ a league.

Until the 18th century, the area where Connah's Quay and its neighbours Shotton, Aston and Queensferry now stand was nothing more than fields and a handful of inhabitants. It was not until the silting of the River Dee ended Chester's port activities that people and commerce began to flood in. The docks at Connah's Quay became a vital source of trade and finance for the greater Flintshire area, and with the advent of the railways during the 19th century a number of railway companies began to appear.

The first railway to appear in the area was the Chester and Holyhead Railway running across the coast of North Wales linking the rest of the Great Britain with Ireland via the port at Holyhead. The purpose of this railway was chiefly for post to and from Ireland. During the 19th century, the railway's importance grew as Holyhead became the destination of choice for Ireland rather than Liverpool. Most of the line was quadruple tracked and this included the stretch through Connah's Quay.

With the success of the Irish Mail trains, the dock was connected by the Wrexham, Mold and Connah's Quay Railway to the nearby town of Buckley, chiefly to transport bricks, clay and pottery products. A railyard was established at Connah's Quay docks with small feeder lines to the lines at Shotton, connecting to the North Wales and Liverpool Railway and the Chester and Connah's Quay Railway. A major steel works, John Summers & Sons, was founded in 1896 and is now owned by Tata Steel. Although now known as Shotton Steel, the plant lies mainly in Connah's Quay.

The town grew from this small port, which included a Ferguson shipyard which built the historic ship Kathleen & May, to becoming a major railway town.

By the late 1950s, the port had virtually ceased trading and the railway was in terminal decline. The two docks had by then long silted up, imprisoning the rotting hulk of an old wooden ship, the Bollam. This old vessel was believed to have taken part in rescuing the defeated British Expeditionary Force from Dunkirk.

The town's passenger railway station (Connah's Quay railway station) on the North Wales Coast Line and northern terminus of the WMCQR line was open between 1870 and 1966. While the line remains open, there no trace of the former station. The street Leighton Court was built in 1998 on the site of the former station forecourt as well as the former WMCQR line, which had been lifted many years before. In fact, the growth of housing in the town and greater area since the line to Buckley was removed means that there is almost no trace of the former line. Its former path across the cricket pitch, up Pinewood Avenue and down past the substation has been completely built over.

Another activity that ceased with the closure of the port was fishing. Fishermen would row out across the river in an arc, paying out a long net over the stern of the boat as they went: see seine fishing. They then returned to shore and hauled in the net. Mostly they caught fluke, which would then be sold from barrows pushed around the housing estates.

Facilitated with the lifting of the Buckley line, by the 1970s the town had absorbed the nearby hamlets of Golftyn, Kelsterton and Wepre and many housing projects were developed.

As with many small towns, the decline of local commerce has resulted in Connah's Quay overdeveloping its houses at the expense of shops and businesses. Many of these houses were indeed refittings of former shops. As a result, the town's population has swollen from a few hundred inhabitants to close to twenty thousand over a period of 50 years.

== Sights ==
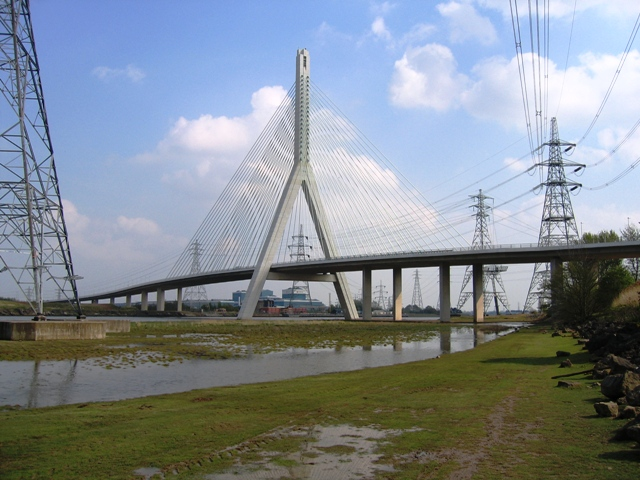
Flintshire Bridge, seen from the south bank of the River Dee (2007)

A number of historic structures are located in Connah's Quay, such as St Mark's Church and St David's Church.

Top-y-Fron Hall is a Grade II* listed structure from the Georgian era.

Connah's Quay Power Station is an example of industrial architecture from the 1990s.

Flintshire Bridge was opened in 1998 by Queen Elizabeth II.

== Economy ==
Business in the town is mainly limited to local newsagents and a few independent traders located along High Street.

While the town itself does not have many businesses, energy production is a major industry in the area and the town is home to Connah's Quay Power Station, a 1498MW gas fired station on the south side of the Dee, which utilises gas not only from the Dee estuary but also the Douglas Complex located further afield at Talacre.

Many of the town's residents are employed at the nearby Deeside Industrial Estate, located on the north side of the Dee, and is the location of a second power station, Tata steelworks, Toyota, Wales Rally GB and the central headquarters of the Iceland (supermarket) chain of supermarkets.

== Education ==
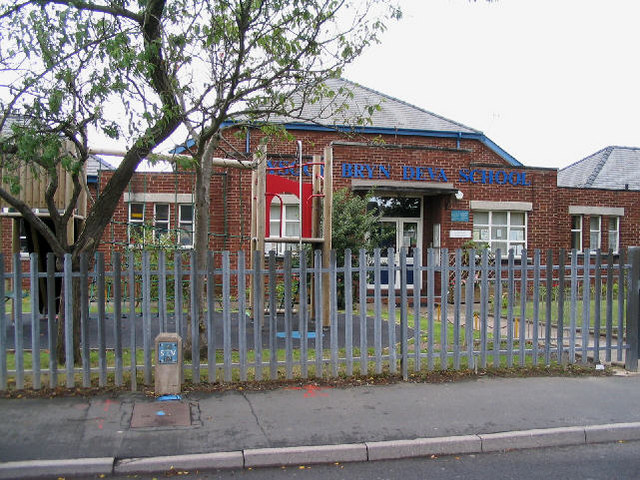
Bryn Deva Primary School (2006)

Schools in Connah's Quay include Connah's Quay High School, Bryn Deva Primary, Wepre Primary, Brookfield Primary and Golftyn Primary.

Further education is provided by Coleg Cambria, formerly Kelsterton College, and by the 6th Form at Connah's Quay High School, which shares resources and students with other schools in Deeside.

== Community ==
Since the 1990s, several large housing developments have been built in Connah's Quay and the town had a booming property market, with house prices steadily increasing the town appeared to have finally shaken the effects of the mass redundancies from major employers in the 1970s and 1980s. However, surveys in the 2010s show that unemployment in the Connah's Quay area was rising by a further four percent every year. Crime statistics in 2013 ranked Connah's Quay (central) as the 5th highest rate in Flintshire with neighbouring Shotton (east) placed worst.

== Governance ==
There are two tiers of local government covering Connah's Quay, at community (town) and county level: Connah's Quay Town Council and Flintshire County Council. The town council is based at the Quay Building on Fron Road.

The town council consists of 20 councillors who are elected from four wards; 3 from Connah's Quay Wepre, 5 from Connah's Quay Central and 6 each from Connah's Quay Golftyn and Connah's Quay South. The same wards are used as electoral wards for Flintshire County Council. Connah's Quay Wepre elects one councillor, and the three other electoral wards each elect two.

Connah's Quay is part of the Alyn and Deeside constituency and North Wales region for the Senedd, and of the Alyn and Deeside constituency for parliament.

=== Administrative history ===
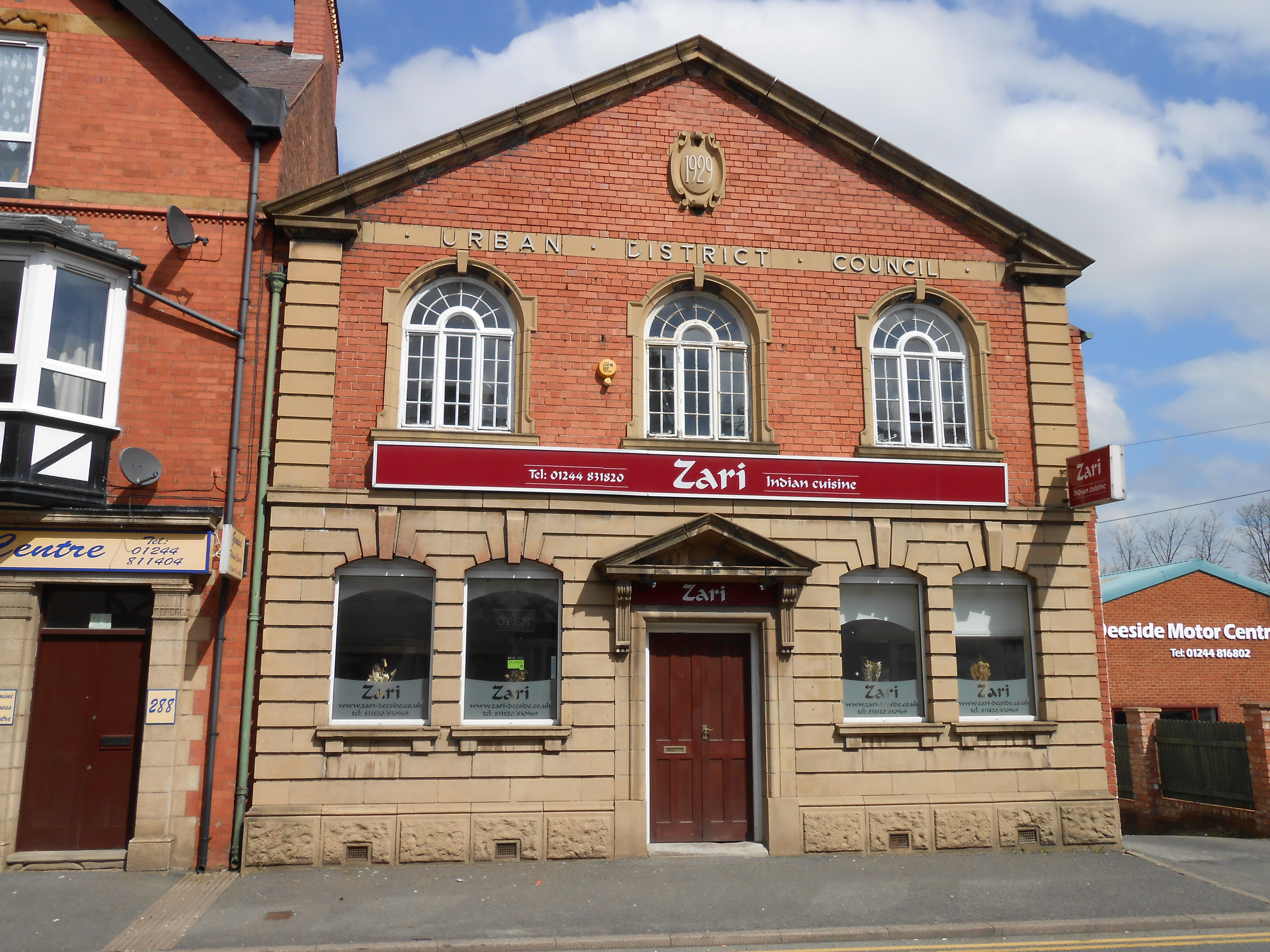
Former Connah's Quay Urban District Council Building, 286 High Street, now a restaurant.

The area which is now Connah's Quay was historically part of the townships of Golftyn and Wepre, which both formed part of the ancient parish of Northop. When elected parish and district councils were created in 1894 Northop was given a parish council and included in the Holywell Rural District. Efforts to give Connah's Quay its own council led to it being made a separate urban district in 1896.

Connah's Quay Urban District Council built itself a headquarters at 286 High Street in 1929, which was replaced in the 1960s by the Civic Centre on Wepre Drive. The urban district was abolished in 1974, with its area becoming a community instead. District-level functions passed to Alyn and Deeside District Council, which was in turn replaced by Flintshire County Council in 1996.

== Sport ==
=== Football ===
The town is home to Deeside College which has on site the North Wales indoor athletics centre and athletics track which is used by Connah's Quay Nomads F.C. After having continuously played in the League of Wales during the 1990s, the club were relegated to the Cymru Alliance in 2009 due to the restructuring of the Welsh Premier League. Later the team won the Cymru Alliance twice in succession and were finally readmitted to the WPL. The Nomads became champions of Wales in the 2019–20 season, winning the league for the first time in the clubs history.

=== Cricket ===
The town is also home to a cricket club, who play their home games at Central Park. They have 7 teams in the North Wales League, the 1st XI won the North Wales Premier Cricket League in 2011.

=== Miscellaneous ===
Other facilities include Connah's Quay Sport Centre which has 4 grass football pitches, a sports hall, 2 gymnasiums, an outdoor floodlit artificial pitch which can host 3 x 6 a side football pitches or a full size football or hockey pitch. There is also an indoor sports hall which hosts 5 a side, basketball, badminton and many other activities. A swimming pool is also located in the town, just off Wepre Drive.

== Notable people ==
- Carl Sargeant (1968–2017), politician, Minister for Housing and Regeneration and Assembly Member for Alyn and Deeside since 2003, lived in the town until his death.
- Luke Thomas (born 1993), a celebrity chef, author and entrepreneur
- Scott van-der-sluis (born 2001) Love Island Contestant in 2023 UK Tenth Series, US Fifth Series and Love Island Games

=== Sport ===
- Teddy Peers (1886–1935) goalkeeper with 186 club caps for Wolves and 12 for Wales
- T. G. Jones (1917–2004) pre-war footballer with over 180 club caps, raised in Connah's Quay.
- Ted Hankey (born 1968) former BDO darts world champion, lived in the town during the 1990s.
- Darren Tinson (born 1969) footballer with over 650 club caps, now manager.
- Gareth Owen (born 1971) footballer with over 430 club caps.
- Tom Doran (born 1987) boxer, held the WBC International middleweight title in 2016
- Drew Parker (born 1997) independent wrestler previously with Big Japan Pro Wrestling
- Charlie Hewitt Footballer and manager. Played for Tottenham between 1907 and 1908 and managed Wrexham between 1924 and 1926

== Cultural references ==
The town is mentioned in the lyrics of the Catatonia song "Imaginary Friend" which is found on the album Paper Scissors Stone.
