= Luke Thomas (chef) =

Welsh chef (b. 1993)

- Born: 2 October 1993 (age 32); Connah's Quay, North Wales
- Culinary career
- Current restaurants: Luke's Dining Room; Blacks Club Soho
- Television shows: Junior MasterChef; Great British Menu; Britain's Youngest Chef; Russell Howard's Good News
- Award won: FutureChef Winner 2009
- Website: lukethomas.co.uk

Luke Thomas (born 2 October 1993) is a celebrity chef, author and entrepreneur who made headlines when he was just eighteen years old, being named the youngest head chef in the United Kingdom. Thomas is the brand owner of the historic social club known as Blacks, located in a restored 18th-century Georgian townhouse in Soho London, as well as the chef-owner of Luke's Dining Room located at Sanctum on the Green, in Cookham. Thomas has also appeared as himself in a number of television shows produced in the United Kingdom, including Russell Howard's Good News, the Great British Menu and Junior MasterChef, as well as the BBC Three documentary titled Britain's Youngest Chef featuring the trials, tribulations and meteoric rise of a young Chef Luke Thomas.

In 2021, Thomas became the CEO and co-owner of Café Habana, a downtown New York City restaurant serving Cuban and Mexican inspired cuisine that was founded in 1998 by entrepreneur and investor Sean Meenan, who also went on to open Café Habana locations in Tokyo, Dubai, and Malibu, California with Casamigos Tequila co-founder Rande Gerber.

Luke is an investor/partner in The Coffee Collaborative, Sessions Market, Fast Fine Restaurant Group who own restaurant brands V and 1889 in Sweden & USA as well as being a founding partner of the meat alternative brand Plant Punk.

== Career ==
Thomas was born in Connah's Quay, North Wales, and began cooking at the age of 12.

Thomas has worked at the Chester Grosvenor Hotel in Cheshire, as well as the Burj Al Arab hotel in Dubai and the Alinea (restaurant) in Chicago.

Thomas has also worked alongside several Michelin starred chefs, including Heston Blumenthal at The Fat Duck, Thomas Keller at a French Laundry pop-up restaurant in London, and fellow celebrity chef Gary Rhodes.

In 2009, at the age of 15, Thomas won the FutureChef competition by Springboard in the United Kingdom.

In 2012, at the age of 18, Thomas became the youngest head chef in the United Kingdom when he took over at a restaurant in Cookham. The restaurant was originally called Sanctum on the Green, but was renamed to Luke's Fine Dining at Sanctum on the Green before being shortened to simply Luke's Dining Room under the direction of Thomas. This notable event was filmed for television by the BBC Three for a documentary series titled Britain's Youngest Chef, and although this was the first time for Thomas to be filmed for television, his first actual television appearance to air as a celebrity chef was as an expert on the British television series Junior MasterChef followed by an appearance on British television comedian Russell Howard's Good News.

Thomas also competed as a chef on the Great British Menu television series in 2013 against chef Mary Ann Gilchrist and chef Richard Davies, where he became the youngest competitor to ever appear on the show.

In 2013, Thomas opened a pop-up restaurant for six months in Mayfair, London, alongside hotelier Mark Fuller. He later followed that up by opening another pop-up restaurant with Fuller in Dubai in 2015, both known collectively as Retro Feasts.

In 2014, Thomas found time between the opening of his two Retro Feasts pop-up restaurants to release his first hardcover cookbook with Penguin Publishing titled Luke's Cookbook: 100 Classic Favourites Given a Modern Makeover.

In 2019, Thomas relaunched the Soho members club first formed as The Club in 1764, and historically known as Blacks since 1992, as both head chef and co-owner of the restored Georgian style building designed and built in 1732 as a four-story townhouse for the London neighborhood.

== Britain's Youngest Chef ==
Britain's Youngest Chef is a BBC Three documentary following seven months in the life of young head chef Luke Thomas as he reaches for cookery's ultimate prize, a Michelin star, backed by hotelier Mark Fuller.

Mark Fuller, who appeared alongside Thomas in the BBC Three documentary about Thomas titled Britain's Youngest Chef, later admitted that he initially teamed up with Thomas without actually tasting any of his food, and stated that his intention was primarily to use the television production as an opportunity for enhancing his own public relations as a hotelier.

Television critic for The Guardian, Tim Dowling, said of the BBC Three series starring chef Luke Thomas and featuring hotelier Mark Fuller, "This was ostensibly intended to be a documentary about a talented but overambitious young lad who would learn from his mistakes before he jeopardized a bright future. But, I'm afraid I came away thinking that all the difficulties featured in the series filmed at the Sanctum on the Green restaurant could have been overcome more quickly if everybody had just shut up and listened to Luke."

The restaurant featured in the documentary was originally named Sanctum on the Green, but was later renamed by Fuller to Luke's Fine Dining at Sanctum on the Green before it was subsequently shortened to Luke's Dining Room under the direction of Thomas.
