= FitzRobert =

FitzRobert is an English surname of Norman origin. Notable people with this surname include:

- John FitzRobert, Lord of Warkworth Castle.
- Mabel FitzRobert, Anglo-Norman noblewoman.
- William Fitz Robert, son of Sir Robert de Caen.
- William Fitz-Robert, Earl of Cornwall
- Robert FitzRobert, 1st Earl of Gloucester.
- Maud FitzRobert, Anglo-Norman noblewoman.
- Simon of Wells, also known as Simon FitzRobert, medieval Bishop.
- William the Conqueror, the illegitimate child of Robert the Magnificent.
- William de Chesney, also known as William FitzRobert, Anglo-Norman nobleman and sheriff.
