= Connah's Quay railway station =

Former railway station in Flintshire, Wales

Connah's Quay
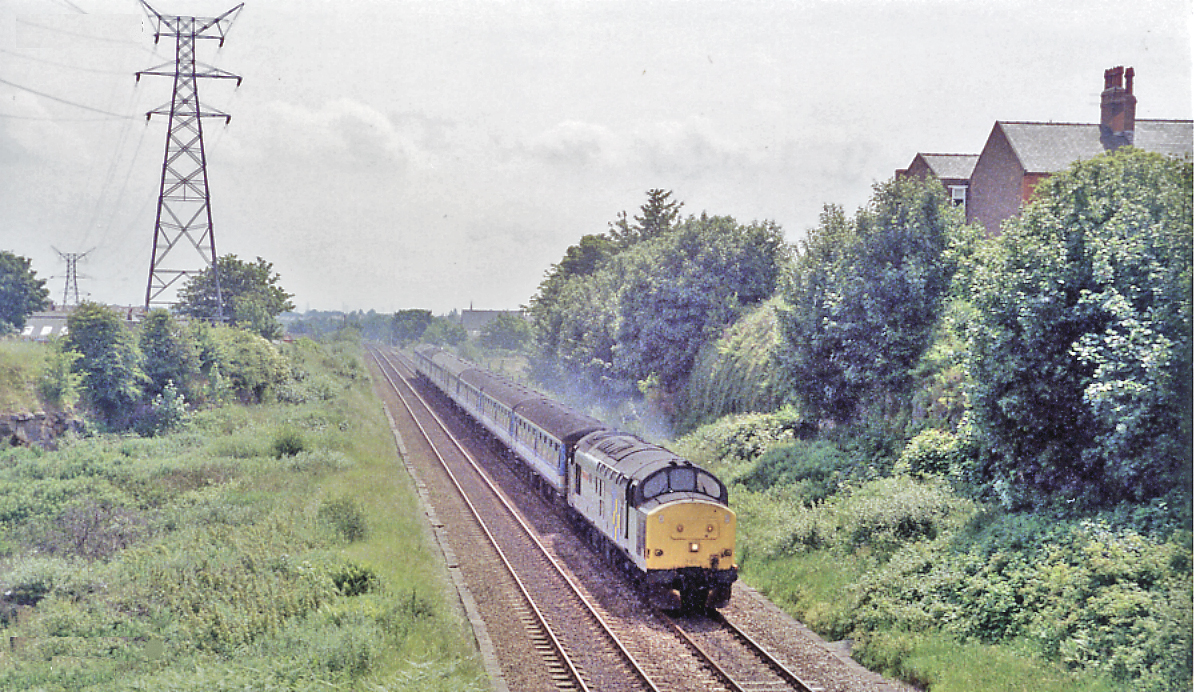
- Holyhead main line near site of Connah's Quay station, Photo from 1994

General information
- Location: Connah's Quay, Flintshire; Wales
- Coordinates: 53.2214°N 3.0610°W
- Grid reference: SJ291699
- Platforms: 2

Other information
- Status: Disused

History
- Original company: Chester and Holyhead Railway
- Pre-grouping: London and North Western Railway
- Post-grouping: London, Midland and Scottish Railway

Key dates
- 1 September 1870: Opened
- 14 February 1966: Closed
Location

Connah's Quay railway station was a railway station located to the north of the town of Connah's Quay, Flintshire, Wales on the south bank of the canalised section of the River Dee.

== History ==
Opened on 1 September 1870 as part of the Chester and Holyhead Railway (now the North Wales Coast Line), the station had two platforms linked by a footbridge. The down platform contained the two storey station building where the ticket office and waiting rooms were located. The opposite platform had only a basic waiting shelter. From its opening day to 1904 it formed a terminus of the Wrexham, Mold and Connah's Quay Railway.

One incident of note in the station's history occurred just before it closed down. On 29 August 1965 a diesel unit train caught fire, injuring nine passengers and the three crew members. Goods services were halted on 1 November 1952 and the station was closed fully on 14 February 1966.

Preceding station	Historical railways	Following station
Flint; Line and station open	London and North Western Railway; North Wales Coast Line	Shotton; Line and station open
Terminus	Wrexham, Mold and Connah's Quay Railway; Buckley Railway	Buckley; Line closed, station open
