= Flintshire Bridge =

Bridge in Deeside, Wales

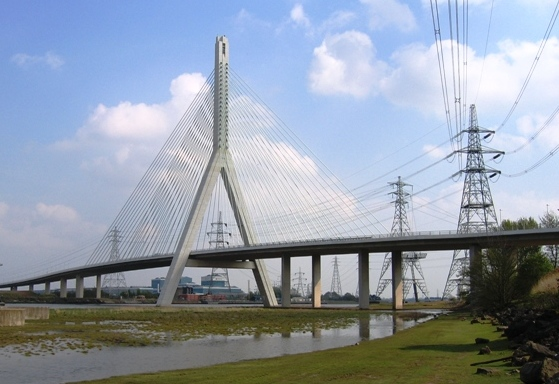
- Coordinates: 53.228738°N 3.065951°W
- Carries: 4 lanes of A548
- Crosses: Dee Estuary
- Locale: Deeside
- Official name: Flintshire Bridge
- Maintained by: Welsh Government; Flintshire County Council

Characteristics
- Design: Cable-stayed
- Material: Concrete
- Total length: 294 metres (965 ft)
- Height: 118 metres (387 ft)
- Longest span: 200 metres (660 ft)

History
- Designer: Gifford Graham and Partners. Architect advice Percy Thomas Partnership
- Construction start: 1994
- Construction end: 1997
- Opened: 6 March 1998

Statistics
- Daily traffic: 13,300 vehicles per day

Location
- Interactive map of Flintshire Bridge

The Flintshire Bridge is a cable-stayed bridge spanning the Dee Estuary in North Wales. The bridge links Flint and Connah's Quay to the shore north of the River Dee at the southern end of the Wirral Peninsula. The bridge cost £55 million to construct. This cost was met by the then Welsh Office and in the future, maintenance costs are expected to be the responsibility of the local authority Flintshire County Council.

The bridge was officially opened in 1998 by Queen Elizabeth II. It carries part of the A548 road, and has been nicknamed 'the bridge to nowhere' as it does not link up with the North Wales Expressway.

It is the largest asymmetric cable-stayed bridge in Britain.

== Gallery ==
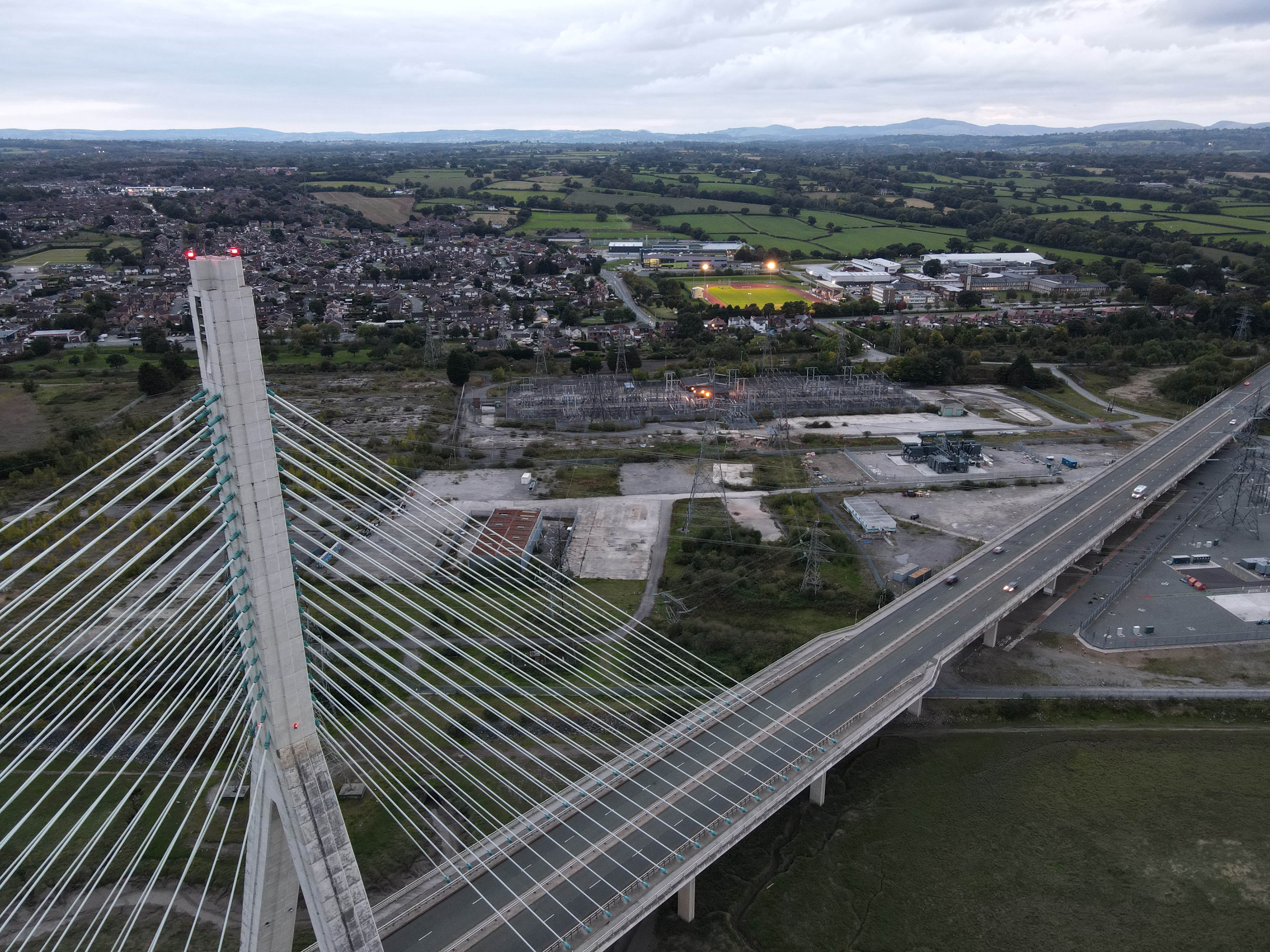
The bridge shown with Deeside Stadium

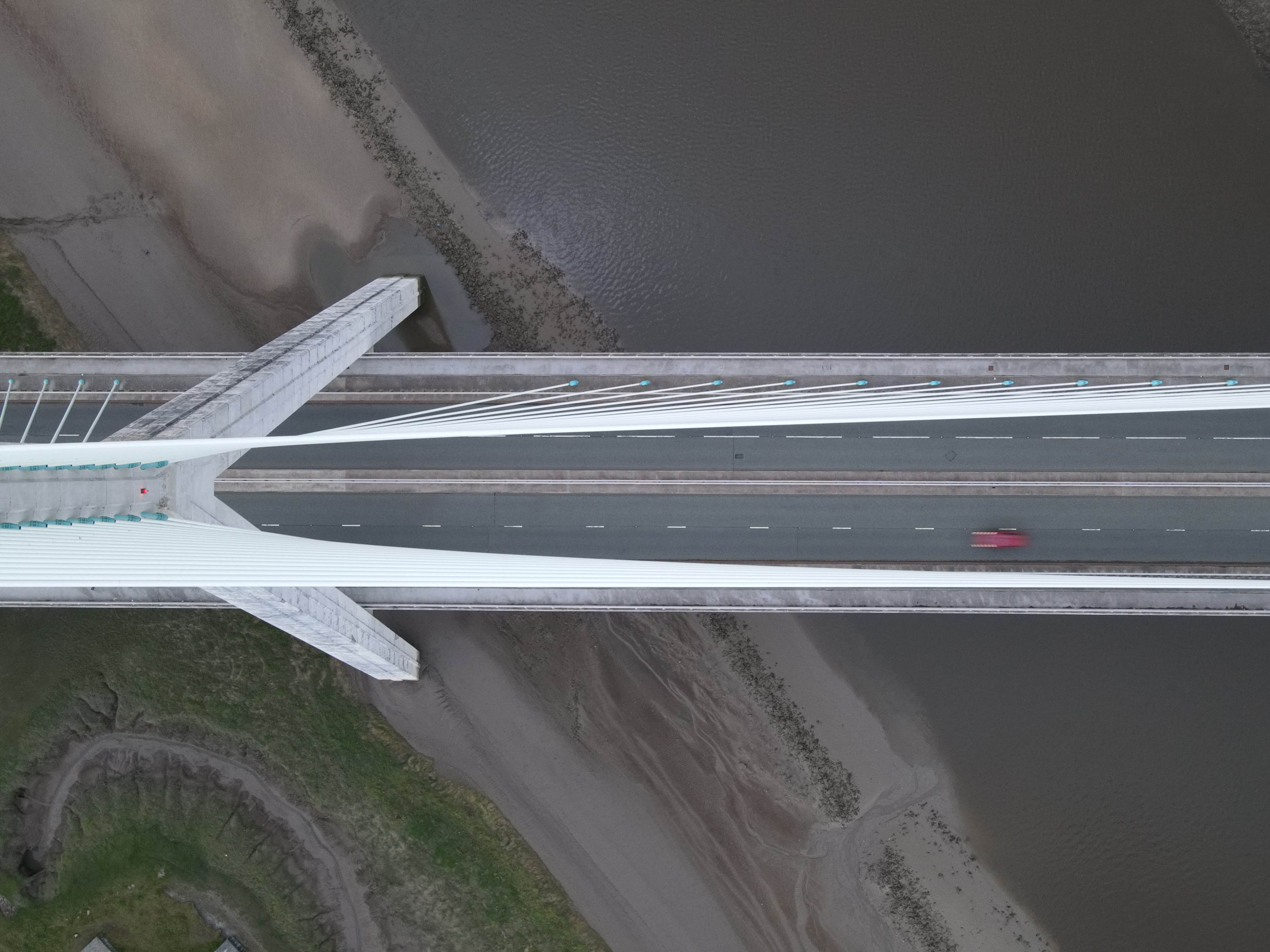
Aerial view

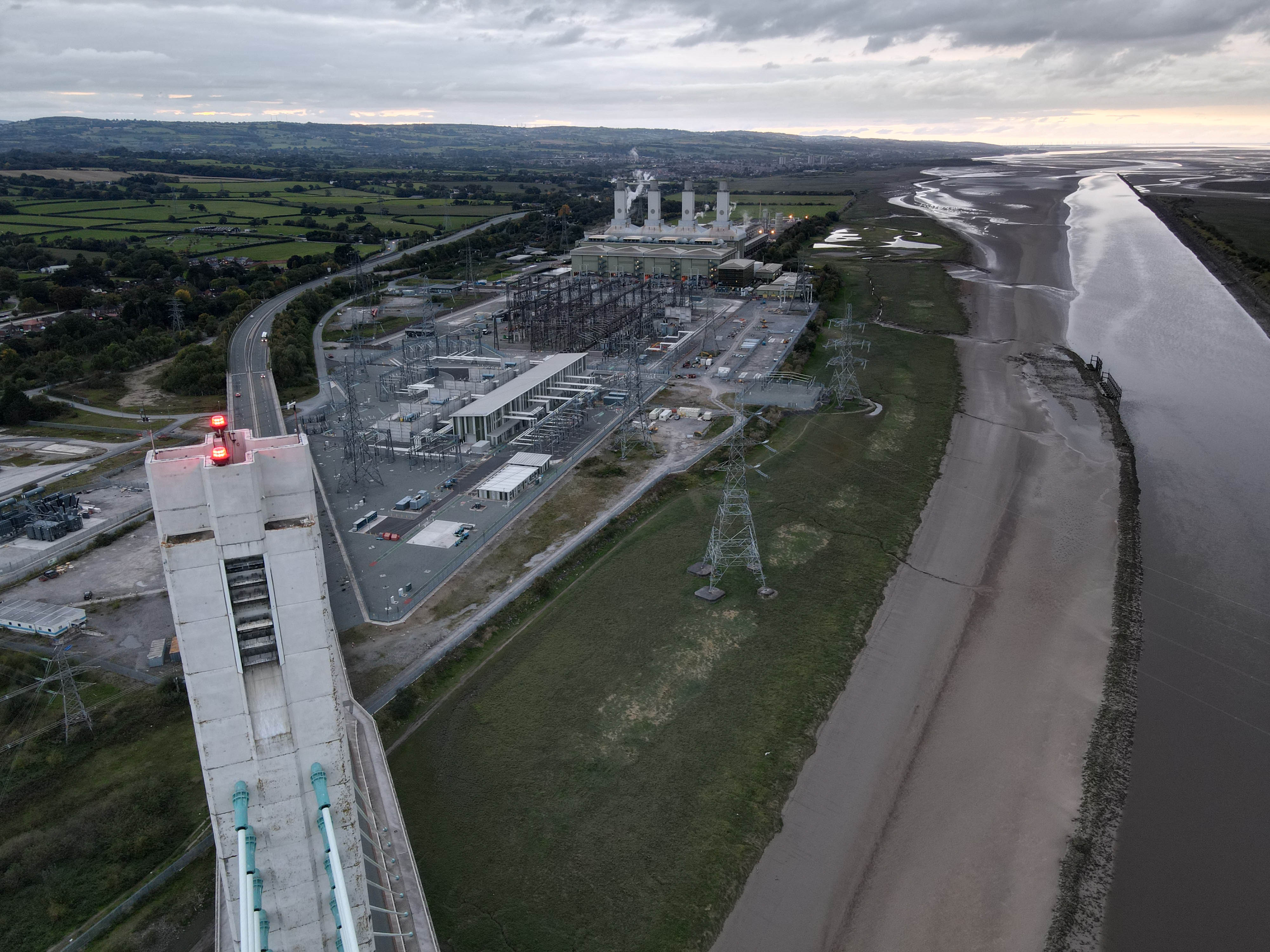
The tower shown with Connah's Quay Power Station

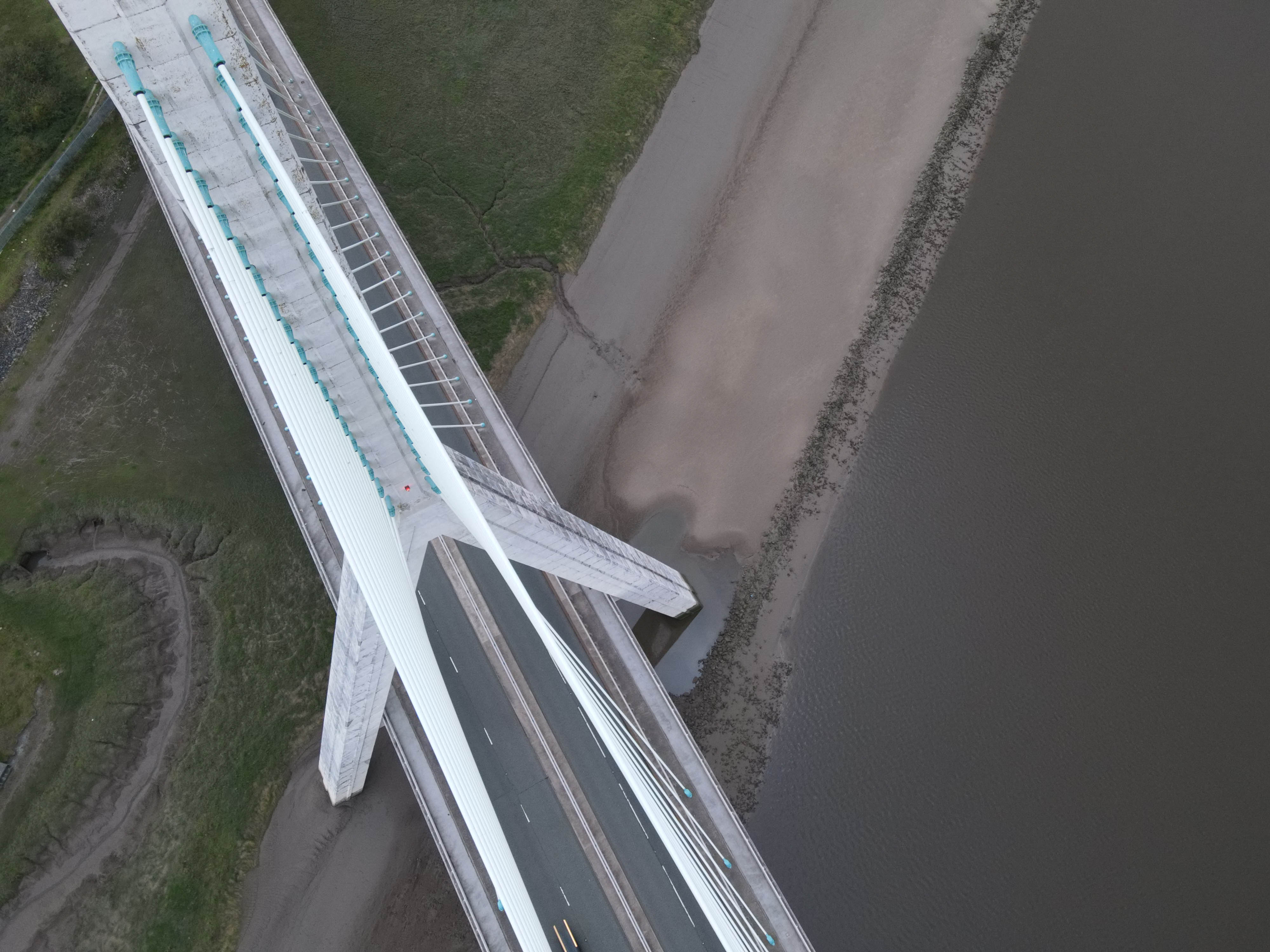
Aerial view

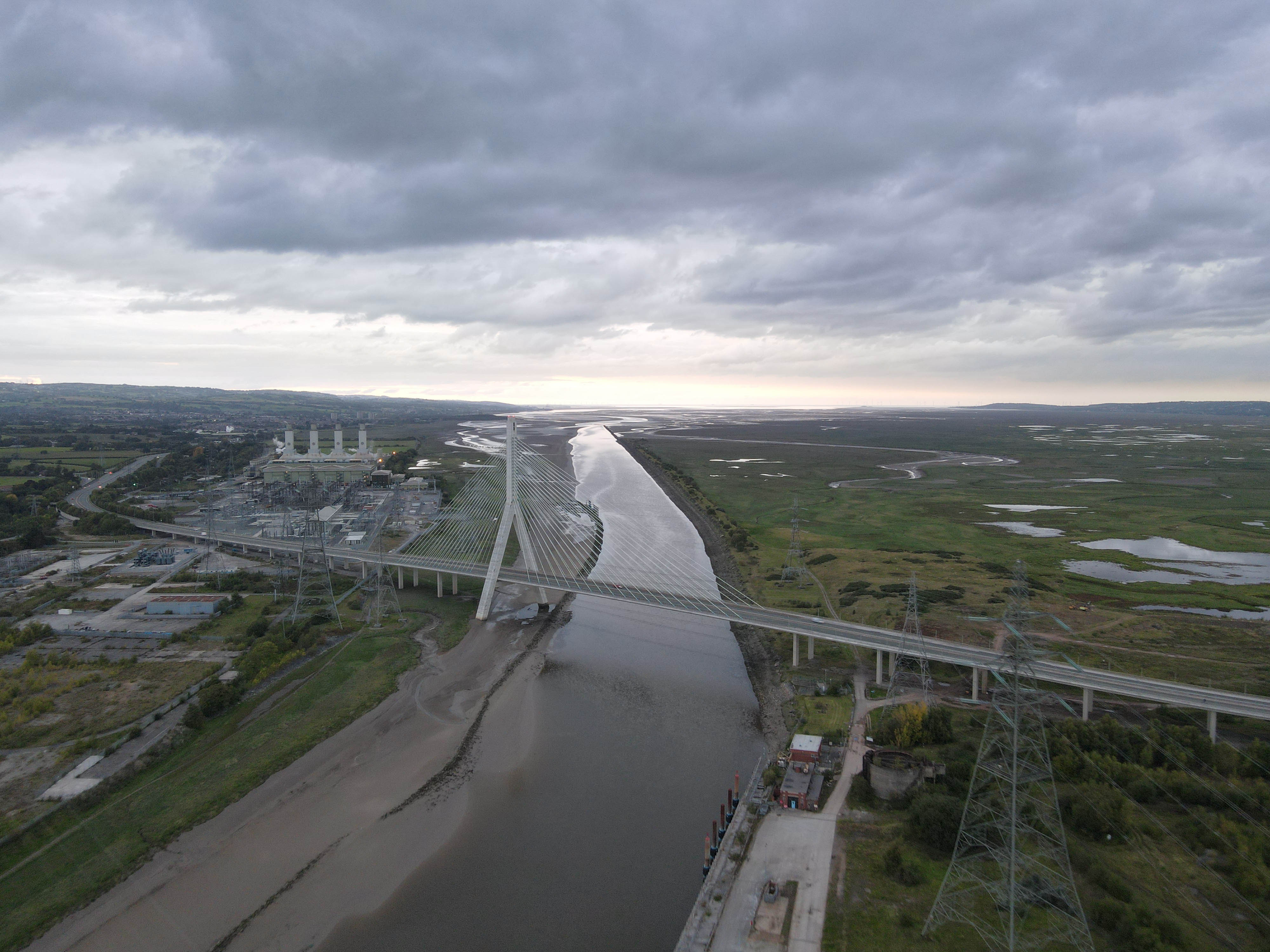
Bridge from afar showing River Dee estuary

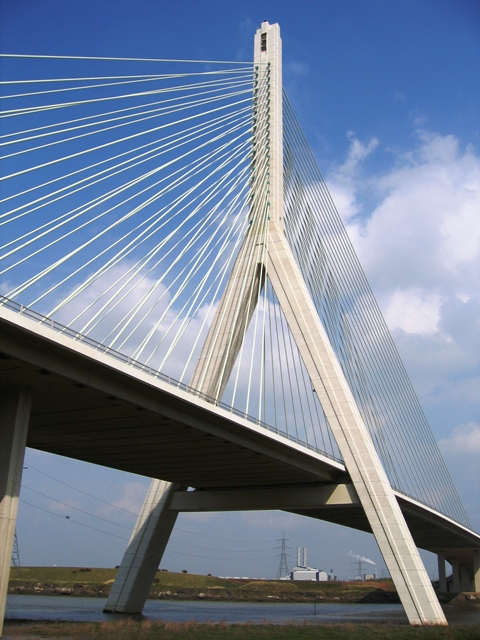
The tower supporting the bridge decking from River Dee

== See also ==
- List of bridges in Wales
