= Liverpool Bay =

Bay in the Irish Sea

Coordinates: 53°32′N 3°12′W

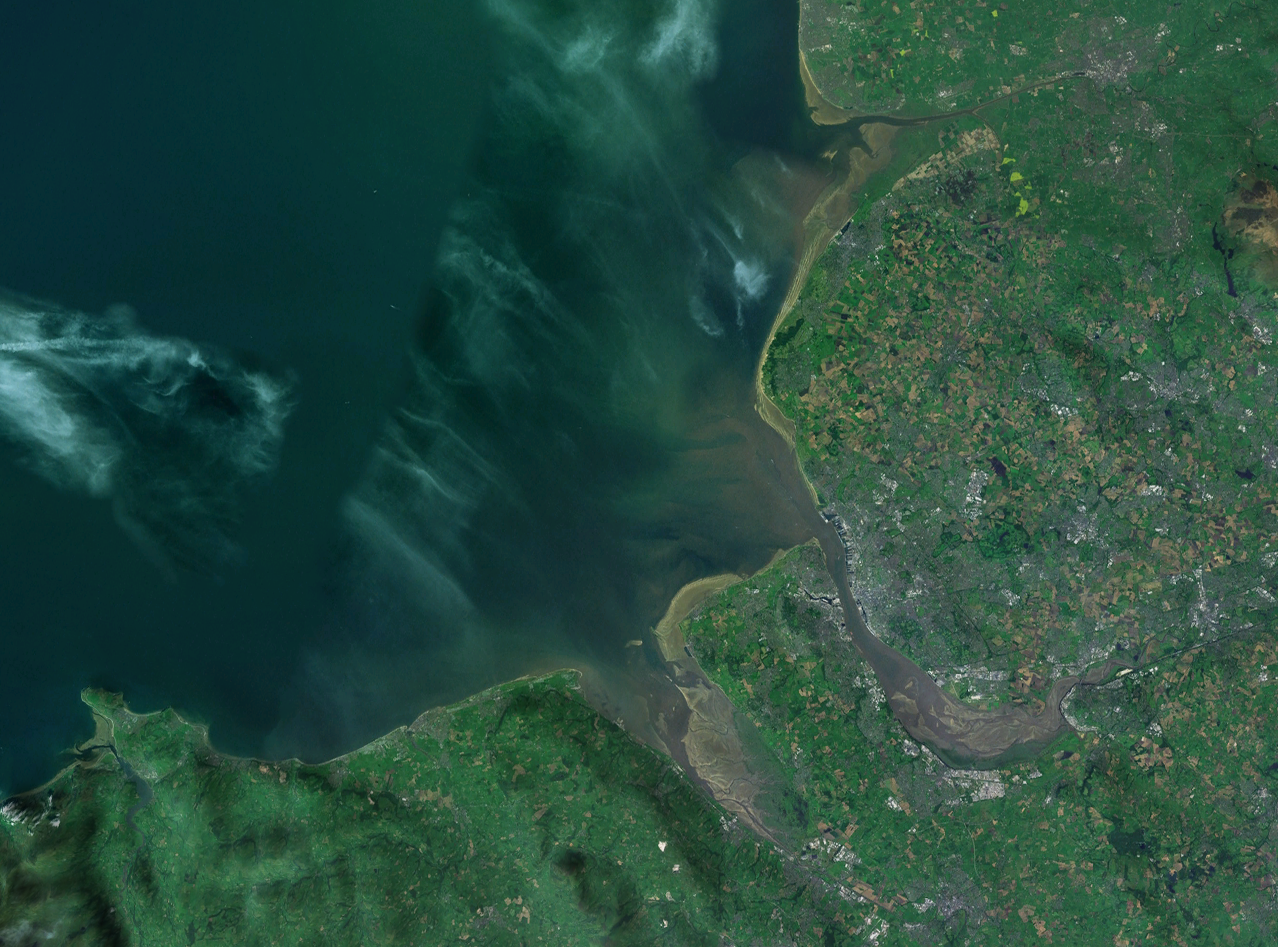
NASA Landsat images of Liverpool Bay, showing (clockwise) the Ribble, Mersey, Dee and River Clwyd.

Liverpool Bay is a bay of the Irish Sea between northeast Wales, Cheshire, Lancashire and Merseyside to the east of the Irish Sea. The bay is a classic example of a region of freshwater influence. Liverpool Bay has historically suffered from reduced oxygen content from prior massive discharges of sewage sludge, according to C. Michael Hogan.

The rivers Alt, Clwyd, Dee, Ribble and Mersey drain into the bay. The bay is littered with wrecks and has many dive sites. The bay also contains several oil and gas fields including the Douglas Complex, with a combined daily capacity (January 2008) of 60,000 barrels. The UK's first major offshore wind farm, North Hoyle, is located in the south of the bay, which is a busy shipping route to the Mersey Docks.

The land area around the bay is occasionally referred to as the "Liverpool Bay Area". Though the term is seen by some as a possible official alternative to Merseyside, it is more often used to describe a much wider area which may include the West Lancashire towns of Ormskirk and Skelmersdale to the north, St Helens and Warrington to the east and Chester plus North Wales to the south. In this sense, it is often promoted by local thinkers and urbanists to encourage regional co-operation in both economic and cultural terms. It is not recognised by the British Government as a strategic economic sub-region, however. Despite having its advocates, the term is still not particularly common in the area.

The English portion of the Liverpool Bay land area is one of the 120 natural areas into which England is divided by Natural England for nature conservation purposes.

== Wind power ==
Wind turbines which are the biggest in the world as of 2017 have been installed in Liverpool Bay.

== Notable ships lost in Liverpool Bay ==
- SS City of Brussels
- Ellan Vannin
- PS Lelia
- Ocean Monarch
- Resurgam
- HMS Thetis

== See also ==
- Douglas Complex
- Offshore Storage Installation (Liverpool Bay)
