= List of scheduled monuments in Flintshire =

The county of Flintshire is on the north-east coast of Wales, and two ancient border earthworks run through the length of the county. There are 131 scheduled monuments in the post-1996 county of Flintshire. (The historic county of Flintshire, with its unusual separate exclave, is now split between the unitary areas of Flintshire, Wrexham and Denbighshire, so would have had considerably more scheduled sites). There are a great many prehistoric sites for such a small county. With only one confirmed Neolithic site, it is the Bronze Age and Iron Age sites that dominate, 67 of them found mainly on the north-west of the county. In the main these are burial mounds with eight hillforts and other enclosures. From the early medieval period, Offa's Dyke has ten notable sections in the county, whilst the older Wat's Dyke has nineteen scheduled sections. From the post-Norman medieval period, Flintshire offers a very diverse range of monument types: twenty sites, with ten different site types, including castles, castle mounds, moated sites, chapels and a holy well, field systems, a deserted village and an abbey. In the post-medieval period, there is a packhorse bridge and a lockup, but it is the industrial sites that stand out, especially the water-powered industries in the Greenfield Valley and the pottery sites in Buckley. Flintshire lies wholly within the historic county of Flintshire.

Scheduled monuments have statutory protection. It is illegal to disturb the ground surface or any standing remains. The compilation of the list of sites is undertaken by Cadw Welsh Historic Monuments, which is an executive agency of the National Assembly of Wales. The list of scheduled monuments below is supplied by Cadw with additional material from RCAHMW and Clwyd-Powys Archaeological Trust.

== Scheduled monuments in Flintshire ==
Image	Name	Site type	Community	Location	Details	Period	SAM No & Refs
	Penbedw Park Stone Circle & Standing Stone	Stone circle	Nannerch	53.2019°N 3.2457°W, SJ168679	Five stones form part of a circle. Oaktrees complete the ring. Earliest record is 1784 but it is suspected that it may be an 18th-century fake. Nearby standing stone is Bronze Age.	Prehistoric	FL008
Cave entrance, Gop Hill	Gop Caves	Cave	Trelawnyd and Gwaenysgor	53.3097°N 3.3726°W, SJ086800	14 Neolithic skeletons, plus late Neolithic artifacts of northern English origin. The cave system extends into the hillside, and there is some occupation evidence dating back to Palaeolithic	Prehistoric (Neolithic)	FL067
	Carreg-y-llech standing stone	Standing stone	Treuddyn	53.117°N 3.124°W, SJ248583	1.9m high, possibly set into a tumulus mound, but now the mound has gone.	Prehistoric (Bronze Age)	FL207
	Circle & Two Round Barrows on Southern Portion of Holywell Golf Course	Round barrow	Brynford	53.2654°N 3.2389°W, SJ174749	Circular earth bank, now much disturbed by mineshafts and a golf tee.	Prehistoric	FL031
	Gatehouse Farm round barrow	Round barrow	Brynford	53.2541°N 3.2575°W, SJ162737		Prehistoric	FL204
	Round Barrow 400m SE of Smithy Gate	Round barrow	Brynford	53.2679°N 3.2301°W, SJ180752		Prehistoric	FL032
	Round Barrow at Naid y March, Holywell Common	Round barrow	Brynford	53.2688°N 3.2527°W, SJ165753		Prehistoric	FL033
	Two Round Barrows 90m NE of Eosfan	Round barrow	Brynford	53.2562°N 3.2303°W, SJ180739		Prehistoric	FL046
	Coed Bron-Fawr Round Barrow	Round barrow	Caerwys	53.253°N 3.348°W, SJ101737		Prehistoric	FL104
	Coed Glyn-Bach Round Barrow	Round barrow	Caerwys	53.2501°N 3.3422°W, SJ105734		Prehistoric	FL036
	Coed Shepherd Round Barrow	Round barrow	Caerwys	53.2536°N 3.3344°W, SJ110737		Prehistoric	FL183
	Ffrith y Garreg-Wen Round Barrow	Round barrow	Caerwys	53.273°N 3.2974°W, SJ135759		Prehistoric	FL110
	Pant Ifan Round Barrow	Round barrow	Caerwys	53.2557°N 3.352°W, SJ098740		Prehistoric	FL105
	Pen-y-graig round barrow	Round barrow	Caerwys	53.2675°N 3.3147°W, SJ124753		Prehistoric	FL198
	Round Barrow 153m NW of Plas yn Rhos	Round barrow	Caerwys	53.2591°N 3.3265°W, SJ116743		Prehistoric	FL039
	Round Barrow 225m E of Minffordd Cottage	Round barrow	Caerwys	53.2713°N 3.3229°W, SJ118757		Prehistoric	FL037
	Plas-Yw Round Barrows	Round barrow	Cilcain	53.1936°N 3.2557°W, SJ162670		Prehistoric	FL169
	Rhual-Isaf Round Barrow	Round barrow	Gwernaffield	53.1761°N 3.1603°W, SJ225649		Prehistoric	FL052
	Hen-y-Fail Round Barrow	Round barrow	Halkyn	53.2173°N 3.2045°W, SJ196695		Prehistoric	FL168
	Round Barrow 180m E of Mwccwd	Round barrow	Halkyn	53.2245°N 3.2288°W, SJ180704		Prehistoric	FL040
	Round Barrow at Pentrehobin	Round barrow	Leeswood	53.1544°N 3.1263°W, SJ247625		Prehistoric	FL051
	Barrows 378m E of Berthen-Gam School	Round barrow	Llanasa	53.3069°N 3.32°W, SJ121796		Prehistoric	FL117
	Berthen-Gam Round Barrow	Round barrow	Llanasa	53.3066°N 3.3281°W, SJ116796		Prehistoric	FL107
	Round Barrow 270m E of Axton Baptist Chapel	Round barrow	Llanasa	53.3108°N 3.3402°W, SJ108801		Prehistoric	FL045
	Round Barrows North West of Axton Baptist Chapel	Round barrow	Llanasa	53.3121°N 3.3467°W, SJ103803		Prehistoric	FL114
	St Elmo's Summer House Round Barrows	Round barrow	Llanasa	53.3254°N 3.3781°W, SJ083818		Prehistoric	FL113
	Tyn-y-caeau round barrow	Round barrow	Llanasa	53.3267°N 3.3505°W, SJ101819		Prehistoric	FL201
	Tynewdd round barrow	Round barrow	Llanasa	53.3256°N 3.3555°W, SJ098818		Prehistoric	FL200
	Plas Maen Cottage round barrow	Round barrow	Llanfynydd	53.0955°N 3.0447°W, SJ301558		Prehistoric	FL203
	Round Barrow 450m E of Penbedw Hall	Round barrow	Nannerch	53.2043°N 3.244°W, SJ170681		Prehistoric	FL134
	Nercwys Mountain Cairn	Cairn circle	Nercwys	53.1136°N 3.1652°W, SJ221580		Prehistoric	FL194
	Barrow on E Slope of Gop Hill	Round barrow	Trelawnyd and Gwaenysgor	53.31°N 3.3697°W, SJ088801		Prehistoric	FL042
	Bryn yr Odyn Round Barrow	Round barrow	Trelawnyd and Gwaenysgor	53.3126°N 3.3585°W, SJ095803		Prehistoric	FL191
The cairn at Gop Hill	The Gop	Cairn	Trelawnyd and Gwaenysgor	53.3104°N 3.3723°W, SJ086801	Largest cairn in Wales, 12m high and 100m across. No internal finds, and dated to the Bronze Age, but the possibility remains that it is a Neolithic passage grave .	Prehistoric (Bronze Age or earlier)	FL007
	Hen-dy round barrow	Round barrow	Trelawnyd and Gwaenysgor	53.3045°N 3.3739°W, SJ085795		Prehistoric	FL202
	Round Barrow 225m E of Village	Round barrow	Trelawnyd and Gwaenysgor	53.3175°N 3.3845°W, SJ078809		Prehistoric	FL044
	Round Barrow on Coed Yr Esgob	Round barrow	Trelawnyd and Gwaenysgor	53.3219°N 3.3963°W, SJ070814		Prehistoric	FL043
	Bryntirion round barrow	Round barrow	Treuddyn	53.1153°N 3.1301°W, SJ244581		Prehistoric	FL208
	Pen-y-stryt round barrow	Round barrow	Treuddyn	53.1123°N 3.1333°W, SJ242578		Prehistoric	FL206
	Pentre round barrow	Round barrow	Treuddyn	53.1087°N 3.1366°W, SJ240574		Prehistoric	FL205
	Bryn Digrif Round Barrows	Round barrow	Whitford	53.3005°N 3.3134°W, SJ125789		Prehistoric	FL116
	Coed-y-bryn round barrow	Round barrow	Whitford	53.3018°N 3.3068°W, SJ130791		Prehistoric	FL209
	Crown Wood Round Barrow	Round barrow	Whitford	53.2746°N 3.3135°W, SJ125760		Prehistoric	FL111
	Groesffordd round barrows	Round barrow	Whitford	53.2887°N 3.3039°W, SJ131776		Prehistoric	FL199
	Round Barrow 135m NW of Rosehill Farm Gorsedd	Round barrow	Whitford	53.2807°N 3.2804°W, SJ147767		Prehistoric	FL050
	Round Barrow 350m SW of Glol Farm	Round barrow	Whitford	53.2951°N 3.3197°W, SJ121783		Prehistoric	FL187
	Round Barrow 450m South West of Glol Farm	Round barrow	Whitford	53.2936°N 3.3198°W, SJ121782		Prehistoric	FL074
	Y Gorseddau Round Barrows	Round barrow	Whitford	53.2798°N 3.2776°W, SJ149766		Prehistoric	FL075
	Bryn y Cosyn Round Barrows	Round barrow	Ysceifiog	53.2444°N 3.2305°W, SJ179726		Prehistoric	FL096
	Groes Faen Bach round barrow	Round barrow	Ysceifiog	53.2456°N 3.2798°W, SJ147728		Prehistoric	FL195
	Llyfanod round barrow	Round barrow	Ysceifiog	53.2495°N 3.285°W, SJ143732		Prehistoric	FL196
	Llyn Du Round Barrow	Round barrow	Ysceifiog	53.2653°N 3.2725°W, SJ152750		Prehistoric	FL189
	Nook round barrow	Round barrow	Ysceifiog	53.2516°N 3.2905°W, SJ139735		Prehistoric	FL197
	Round Barrow 180m NW of Groesfaen	Round barrow	Ysceifiog	53.2483°N 3.2821°W, SJ145731		Prehistoric	FL056
	Round Barrow 225m SE of Parc y Prysau	Round barrow	Ysceifiog	53.2433°N 3.2249°W, SJ183725		Prehistoric	FL053
	Round Barrow 225m SE of Plas Newydd	Round barrow	Ysceifiog	53.2586°N 3.2705°W, SJ153742		Prehistoric	FL076
	Round Barrow 270m NW of Waen Isaf	Round barrow	Ysceifiog	53.2507°N 3.2706°W, SJ153733		Prehistoric	FL077
	Round Barrow 450m SSW of Llynfanod	Round barrow	Ysceifiog	53.2447°N 3.2906°W, SJ139727		Prehistoric	FL055
	Round Barrow 495m SE of Parc y Prysau	Round barrow	Ysceifiog	53.2417°N 3.2223°W, SJ185723		Prehistoric	FL054
	Round Barrow WSW of Llyfanod	Round barrow	Ysceifiog	53.2482°N 3.2899°W, SJ140731		Prehistoric	FL190
	Moel y Gaer Camp	Hillfort	Halkyn	53.2124°N 3.1826°W, SJ211690		Prehistoric	FL011
	Caer Estyn Hillfort	Hillfort	Hope	53.1101°N 3.0262°W, SJ314574		Prehistoric	FL066
	Moel Arthur Camp	Hillfort	Nannerch, (also Llandyrnog), (see also Denbighshire)	53.1846°N 3.2806°W, SJ145660		Prehistoric	FL010
	Glol Camp	Enclosure	Whitford	53.2929°N 3.3218°W, SJ119781		Prehistoric	FL071
	Bron Fadog Enclosure	Enclosure	Ysceifiog	53.2391°N 3.2886°W, SJ140721		Prehistoric	FL173
	Bwrdd y Rhyfel Camp	Enclosure	Ysceifiog	53.2686°N 3.2899°W, SJ140754		Prehistoric	FL072
	Coed Trefraith Enclosure	Enclosure	Ysceifiog	53.2479°N 3.2983°W, SJ134731		Prehistoric	FL161
	Pen-y-Cloddiau Camp	Hillfort	Ysceifiog, (also Llandyrnog), (see also Denbighshire)	53.1986°N 3.3054°W, SJ128676		Prehistoric	FL009
	Pentre Bridge Roman Site	Unclassified site	Flint	53.2405°N 3.1181°W, SJ254720		Roman	FL131
	Ffrith Roman Site	Unclassified site	Llanfynydd	53.0901°N 3.0679°W, SJ286552		Roman	FL164
	Wat's Dyke: Section from Bod Offa to Whitehouse Farm	Linear earthwork	Argoed	53.1634°N 3.1012°W, SJ264634		Early Medieval	FL086
	Wat's Dyke: Section W of Garreg-Lwyd	Linear earthwork	Argoed	53.1549°N 3.0894°W, SJ272625		Early Medieval	FL087
	Wat's Dyke: Sections S of Bryn y Bal	Earthwork (unclassified)	Argoed	53.1726°N 3.1104°W, SJ258645		Early Medieval	FL121
	Wat's Dyke: Section in Fron Tydyr	Linear earthwork	Bagillt	53.256°N 3.1972°W, SJ202738		Early Medieval	FL081
	Wat's Dyke: Section in Wern Sirk Wood	Linear earthwork	Bagillt	53.2601°N 3.2011°W, SJ199743		Early Medieval	FL080
	Wat's Dyke: Section NE of Hen-Dy Farm	Linear earthwork	Buckley	53.1518°N 3.0744°W, SJ282621		Early Medieval	FL088
	Wat's Dyke: Section SE of Meadow Mills	Linear earthwork	Holywell	53.2809°N 3.2148°W, SJ191766		Early Medieval	FL079
	Wat's Dyke: Section E of Hope	Linear earthwork	Hope	53.1173°N 3.0312°W, SJ310582		Early Medieval	FL120
	Wat's Dyke: Section N of Bryn Estyn	Linear earthwork	Hope	53.1217°N 3.0333°W, SJ309587		Early Medieval	FL118
	Wat's Dyke: Section N of Carlton Grange	Linear earthwork	Hope	53.1234°N 3.0347°W, SJ308589		Unknown	FL172
	Wat's Dyke: Section N of Rhydyn Farm	Linear earthwork	Hope	53.1135°N 3.0301°W, SJ311578		Early Medieval	FL119
	Wat's Dyke: Section N of the Rectory, Hope	Linear earthwork	Hope	53.119°N 3.032°W, SJ310584		Early Medieval	FL171
	Wat's Dyke: Section E and SE of Dyke Farm	Linear earthwork	Leeswood	53.1464°N 3.0619°W, SJ290615		Early Medieval	FL089
	Wat's Dyke: Section from Chester-Holywell Road to Soughton Farm	Linear earthwork	Northop	53.204°N 3.1476°W, SJ234680		Early Medieval	FL083
	Wat's Dyke: Section from Coed Llys to Chester-Holywell Road	Linear earthwork	Northop	53.2157°N 3.1513°W, SJ232693		Early Medieval	FL082
	Wat's Dyke: Section N & E of New Brighton	Linear earthwork	Northop	53.184°N 3.12°W, SJ252657		Early Medieval	FL085
	Wat's Dyke: Section SE of Clawdd Offa	Linear earthwork	Northop	53.1938°N 3.1335°W, SJ243669		Early Medieval	FL084
	Wat's Dyke: Section NW of Clawdd Offa	Linear earthwork	Penyffordd	53.1381°N 3.0496°W, SJ298606		Early Medieval	FL090
	Wat's Dyke: Two sections between Clawdd Offa & Pigeon House Farm	Linear earthwork	Penyffordd	53.1308°N 3.0429°W, SJ303598		Early Medieval	FL091
	Downing Hall Inscribed Stone (now in Whitford Church)	Inscribed stone	Whitford	53.294°N 3.2817°W, SJ146782		Early Medieval	FL013
	Maen Achwyfan Cross	Cross	Whitford	53.2987°N 3.3085°W, SJ128787		Early Medieval	FL005
	Offa's Dyke: Section extending 117m NW of Church	Linear earthwork	Llanfynydd	53.1025°N 3.0789°W, SJ278566		Early Medieval	FL022
	Offa's Dyke: Section E of Trelawnyd	Linear earthwork	Trelawnyd and Gwaenysgor	53.3053°N 3.3589°W, SJ095795		Early Medieval	FL122
	Offas Dyke: Section North of Crown Inn	Linear earthwork	Trelawnyd and Gwaenysgor	53.3067°N 3.364°W, SJ092797		Early Medieval	FL124
	Offas Dyke: Section North West of Tre Abbot-Fawr	Linear earthwork	Trelawnyd and Gwaenysgor	53.2988°N 3.3417°W, SJ106788		Early Medieval	FL123
	Offas Dyke: Section South East of Gop Farm	Linear earthwork	Trelawnyd and Gwaenysgor	53.3068°N 3.3741°W, SJ085797		Early Medieval	FL125
	Offas Dyke: Section extending 477m from Coed Talon Banks	Linear earthwork	Treuddyn	53.1107°N 3.0927°W, SJ269576		Early Medieval	FL021
	Brynbella Mound, and sections of Offa's Dyke adjoining it.	Linear earthwork	Whitford	53.2788°N 3.2999°W, SJ134765		Early Medieval	FL103
	Offas Dyke: Section from Rhydwen-Fach to Coed Pen-y-Gelli	Linear earthwork	Whitford	53.2788°N 3.2999°W, SJ134765		Early Medieval	FL109
	Offas Dyke: Tan-y-Graig Section	Linear earthwork	Whitford	53.286°N 3.3119°W, SJ126773		Early Medieval	FL108
	Offas Dyke:Section N & S of the Circle on Holywell Racecourse, and Circle and Round Barrow	Linear earthwork	Ysceifiog	53.2676°N 3.2734°W, SJ151752		Early Medieval	FL006
	Tyddyn Castle Mound	Motte	Argoed	53.1614°N 3.119°W, SJ252632		Medieval	FL126
	Bryn Castell Castle Mound	Motte	Bagillt	53.2532°N 3.1642°W, SJ224735		Medieval	FL061
	Hen Blas Castle Site	Castle	Bagillt	53.2522°N 3.1684°W, SJ221734		Medieval	FL062
	Bretton Hall Moated Site	Moated Site	Broughton and Bretton	53.1669°N 2.9499°W, SJ365637		Medieval	FL185
	Green Lane Farm Moated Site	Moated Site	Broughton and Bretton	53.1673°N 2.9979°W, SJ333638		Medieval	FL176
	Spon Chapel	Chapel	Buckley	53.1568°N 3.0735°W, SJ283627		Medieval	FL193
	Enclosure, Field System & Hollow-ways North of Pant	Enclosure	Caerwys	53.2608°N 3.2874°W, SJ142745		Medieval	FL163
	Hen Caerwys Deserted Village Site	Deserted Rural Settlement	Caerwys	53.2581°N 3.2933°W, SJ138742		Medieval	FL162
	Bryn y Cwm Mound & Bailey Castle	Motte & Bailey	Flint	53.2344°N 3.1428°W, SJ238714		Medieval	FL064
The entrance bridge to Flint castle	Flint Castle	Castle	Flint	53.2511°N 3.1301°W, SJ246732	Built from 1277 during King Edward I's campaigns, it has a fortress design used in France but is unique within the British Isles.	Medieval	FL003
	Hafod Wood Moated Site	Moated Site	Halkyn	53.241°N 3.1827°W, SJ211722		Medieval	FL179
Ewloe Castle	Ewloe Castle	Castle	Hawarden	53.2°N 3.0672°W, SJ288675	Built by the Welsh Princes, it was captured by the English in 1277. Now within Wepre Park, it is open to the public	Medieval	FL002
Hawarden medieval Castle	Hawarden Castle	Castle	Hawarden	53.1811°N 3.0201°W, SJ319653	With possible Iron Age origins and Norman remains, Hawarden Castlewas slighted by Cromwell. Now on the private Hawarden Estate.	Medieval	FL016
	Trueman's Hill motte	Motte & Bailey	Hawarden	53.1864°N 3.0301°W, SJ313660		Medieval	FL030
Basingwerk Abbey	Basingwerk Abbey	Abbey	Holywell	53.288°N 3.2074°W, SJ196774	Cistercian Abbey Ruins. Open to the public within Greenfield Valley Heritage Park	Medieval	FL001
	Holywell Castle Mound	Motte	Holywell	53.2774°N 3.2225°W, SJ185762		Medieval	FL029
St Winefride's Well and Chapel, Holywell	St Winifrede's Chapel and Holy Well	Chapel	Holywell	53.2771°N 3.2236°W, SJ185762	Claims to be the oldest continually-visited pilgrimage site in Great Britain. A hand pump still provides drinkable water.	Medieval	FL101
Caergwrle Castle	Caergwrle Castle	Castle	Hope	53.1076°N 3.0367°W, SJ306572	Last castle to be built under Welsh independent rule. Rebuilding began under the English, but a fire in 1283 end all plans of completing it. It is now open to the public, in the care of Caergwrle Community Council	Medieval	FL020
	The Bailey Hill, Mold	Motte & Bailey	Mold	53.1706°N 3.1456°W, SJ235643		Medieval	FL014
	Llys Edwin Medieval Fortified House Site	House (domestic)	Northop	53.2157°N 3.1443°W, SJ236693		Medieval	FL023
	Trelawnyd Churchyard Cross	Cross	Trelawnyd and Gwaenysgor	53.3057°N 3.3685°W, SJ089796		Medieval	FL115
	The 'Lock-Up', Hawarden	Lock-up	Hawarden	53.1842°N 3.0228°W, SJ317657		Post-Medieval/Modern	FL078
Caergwrle Packhorse Bridge	Caergwrle Packhorse Bridge	Bridge	Hope	53.1112°N 3.0378°W, SJ306576		Post-Medieval/Modern	FL133
Ffrith Packhorse Bridge	Bridge 157m E of Ffrith Village	Bridge	Llanfynydd	53.0904°N 3.067°W, SJ286553		Post-Medieval/Modern	FL132
	Industrial Tramway, Near Buckley	Industrial monument	Buckley	53.1704°N 3.0637°W, SJ289642		Post-Medieval/Modern	FL181
	Pinfold Lane Pottery, Site of	Pottery kiln	Buckley	53.1819°N 3.086°W, SJ275655		Post-Medieval/Modern	FL166
	Taylor's Pottery	Pottery kiln	Buckley	53.1801°N 3.0952°W, SJ269653		Post-Medieval/Modern	FL165
Spillway at Bryn Celyn, Greenfields Valley Heritage Park.	Greenfield Valley Mills	Industrial building	Holywell	53.2836°N 3.2147°W, SJ191769	18th century mills producing wire, copper sheets and cotton, powered by water from the Holywell river, Now an industrial heritage park.	Post-Medieval/Modern	FL160
	Kelsterton Brewery	Industrial building	Connah's Quay	53.2274°N 3.0836°W, SJ277705		Post-Medieval/Modern	FL180
	Ministry of Supply Valley Site	Ordnance factory	Cilcain	53.1861°N 3.1908°W, SJ205661		Post-Medieval/Modern	FL210

Scheduled monuments in Flintshire, Wales.
=Prehistoric =Roman =Early Medieval
=Medieval =Post-Medieval/Modern

== See also ==
- List of Cadw properties
- List of castles in Wales
- List of hill forts in Wales
- Historic houses in Wales
- List of monastic houses in Wales
- List of museums in Wales
- List of Roman villas in Wales
