= List of walls =

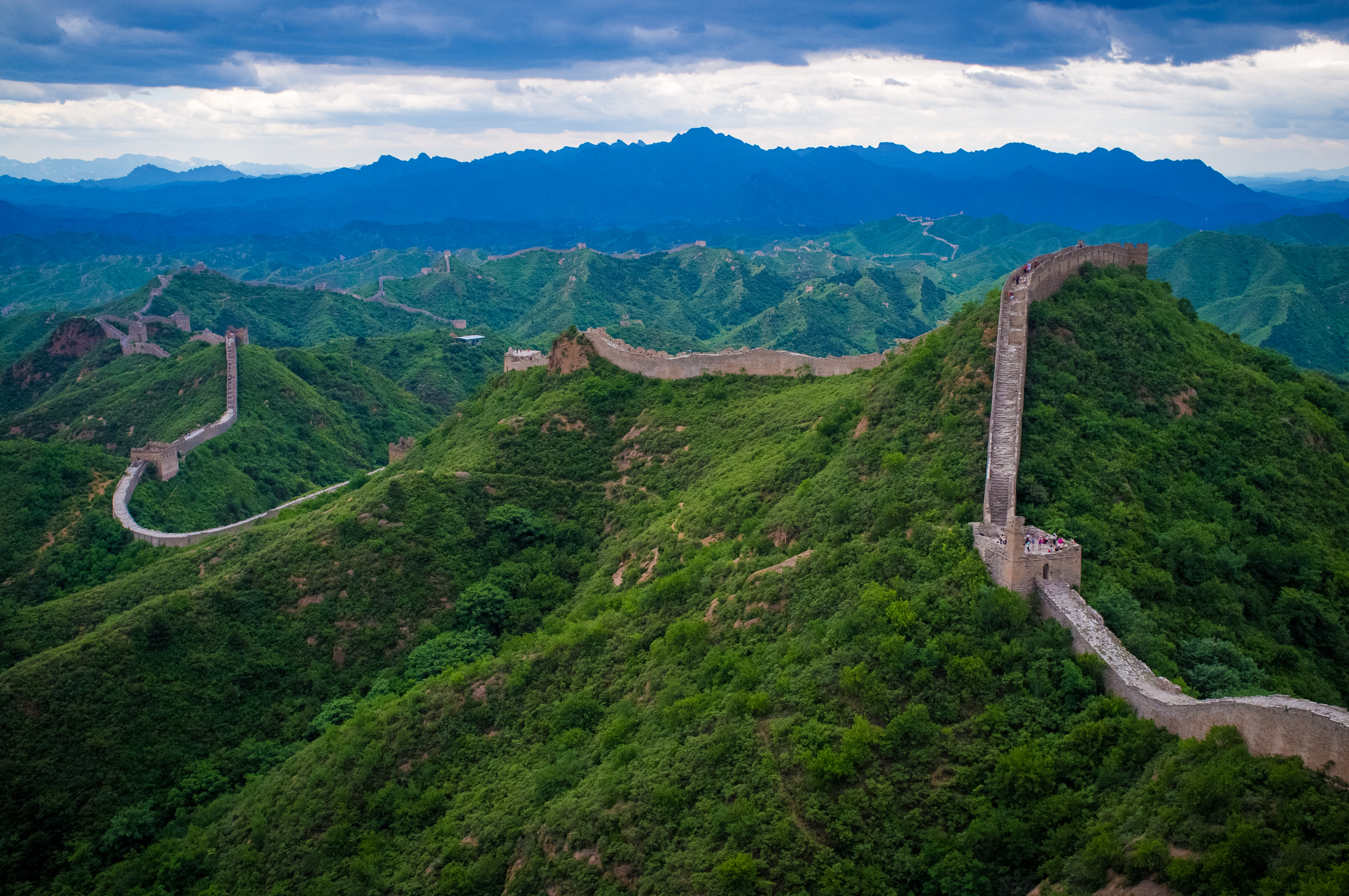
The Great Wall of China is the world's longest wall

See List of fortifications for a list of notable fortified structures. For city walls in particular, see List of cities with defensive walls.

== Pre-modern fortifications ==
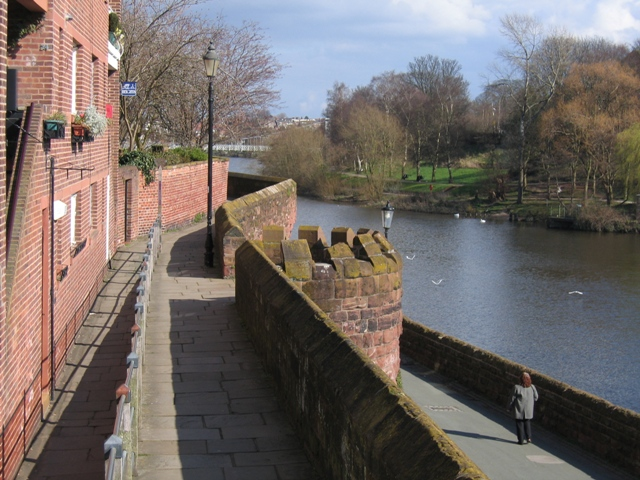
Part of the southern section of the Chester city walls showing the base of a former drum tower and the River Dee

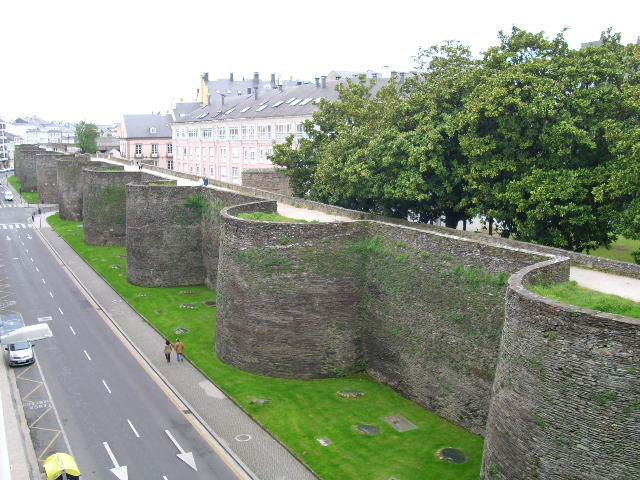
The Roman walls of Lugo are a UNESCO World Heritage Site

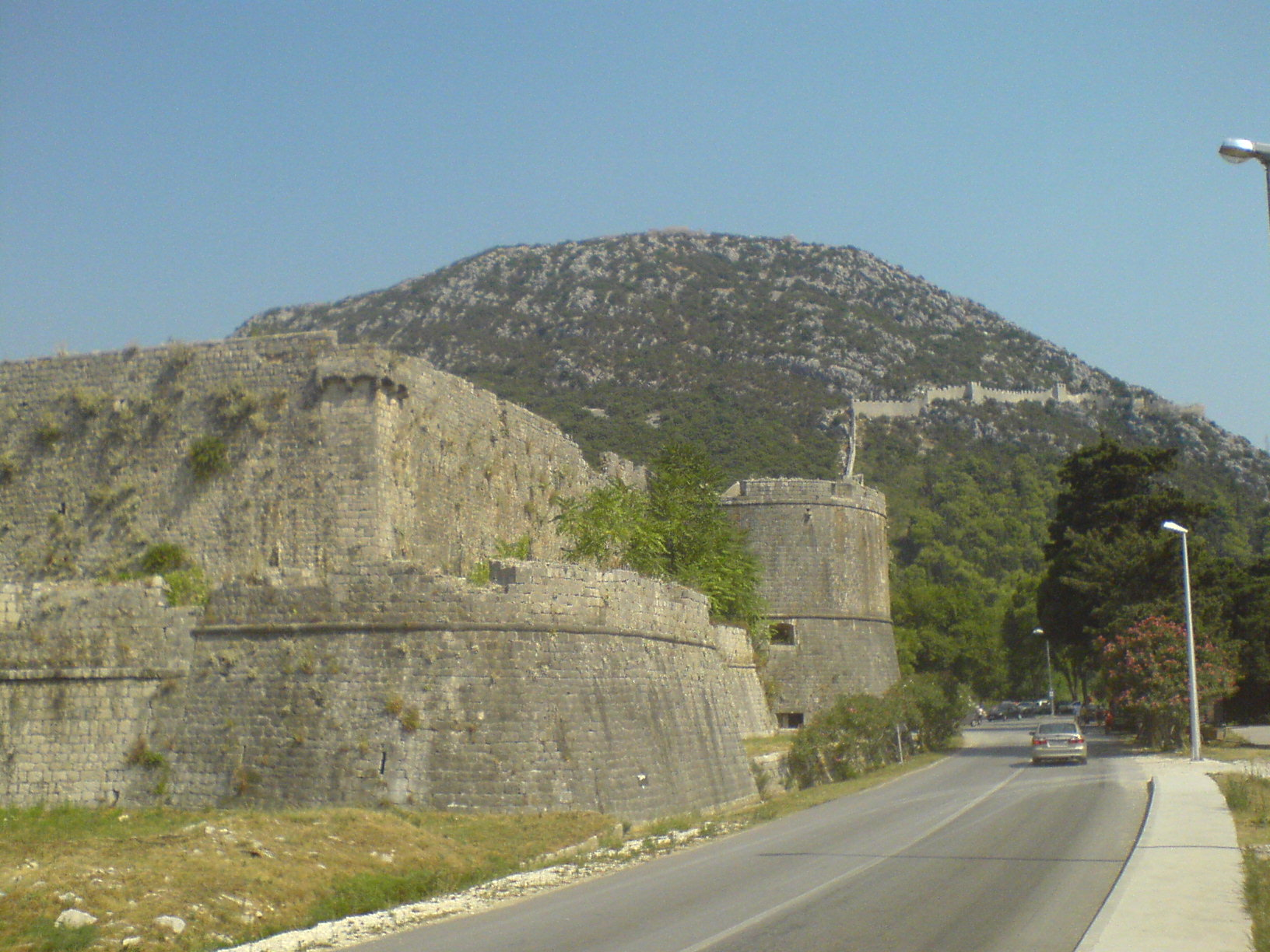
The Walls of Ston are a series of defensive stone walls, originally more than 7 kilometres (4.3 mi) long, that surrounded and protected the city of Ston, in Dalmatia, part of the Republic of Ragusa, in what is now southern Croatia.

=== Africa ===
- (Algeria) (Tunisia) Fossatum Africae
- Sungbo's Eredo, built during 800–1000 AD in Ijebu Ode in Ogun State, southwest Nigeria

=== Americas ===
- (Mexico) Great Wall of Tlaxcala, mentioned in the history of Bernal Díaz del Castillo
- (Peru) Walls of Lima
- (Peru) Wall of Trujillo
- Walls of Old San Juan, Puerto Rico

=== Asia ===
- Great Wall of China, China – part of UNESCO site 438. This is mostly used to refer to the Ming Great Wall, built from 1368 to 1644, measures 8,850 km long.
- (China) Great Wall of Qi, the oldest of the Chinese Great Walls.
- (China) Great Wall of Yan (state)
- (China) Great Wall of Zhongshan (state)
- (China) Great Wall of Zhao (state)
- (China) Great Wall of Qin dynasty
- (China) Great Wall of Han dynasty (206 BC–220 AD), the longest Great Wall in history.
- (China) Great Wall of Northern Wei dynasty
- (China) Great Wall of Northern Qi dynasty
- (China) Great Wall of the Jurchen Jin Dynasty (1115–1234), built to defend against northern nomadic tribes, once spanning over 2,500 kilometers long.
- (China) (Mongolia) Great Wall of Western Xia
- (China) (Mongolia) Great Wall of the Khitan Liao dynasty
- Ranikot Fort, Also called 'The Great Wall of Pakistan', second largest wall of South Asia after Kumbhalgarh fort in India
- Cheolli Jangseong, North Korea and China
- Great Wall of Gorgan in Iran, (World's second longest wall)
- Long Wall of Quảng Ngãi in Quảng Ngãi, Vietnam.
- Kumbhalgarh, in Rajasthan, India
- (Armenia) Smbat Walls
- (China) Miaojiang_Great_Wall
- Sasanian defense lines

=== Europe ===
- Walls of Constantinople in Turkey
- Anastasian Wall in Turkey
- Antonine Wall in Scotland, United Kingdom – part of UNESCO site 430
- (Italy) Aurelian Walls of Rome
- Walls of Ston in Croatia
- Danevirke, Germany
- (Republic of Ireland) Famine walls in Ireland & Scotland
- Roman limes in Upper Germania, Lower Germania and Rhaetia, Germany – part of UNESCO site 430
- (United Kingdom) Hadrian's Wall in England – part of UNESCO site 430
- (Turkey) Long Wall (Thracian Chersonese)
- (Greece) Long_Walls
- Roman_military_frontiers_and_fortifications
- (United Kingdom) Offa's Dyke between Mercia (England) and Powys (Wales)
- Serpent's Wall, the ancient walls in Ukraine
- (United Kingdom) Wall of Severus, between Roman Britain and [not recorded]
- Silesia Walls, Poland
- Trajan's Wall, in Dobruja, Romania
- Athanaric's Wall, Romania
- (United Kingdom) Wat's Dyke parallel, for part of the distance, to Offa's Dyke, England:Wales.
- Great_Zasechnaya_cherta

== Modern defensive walls or border barriers ==
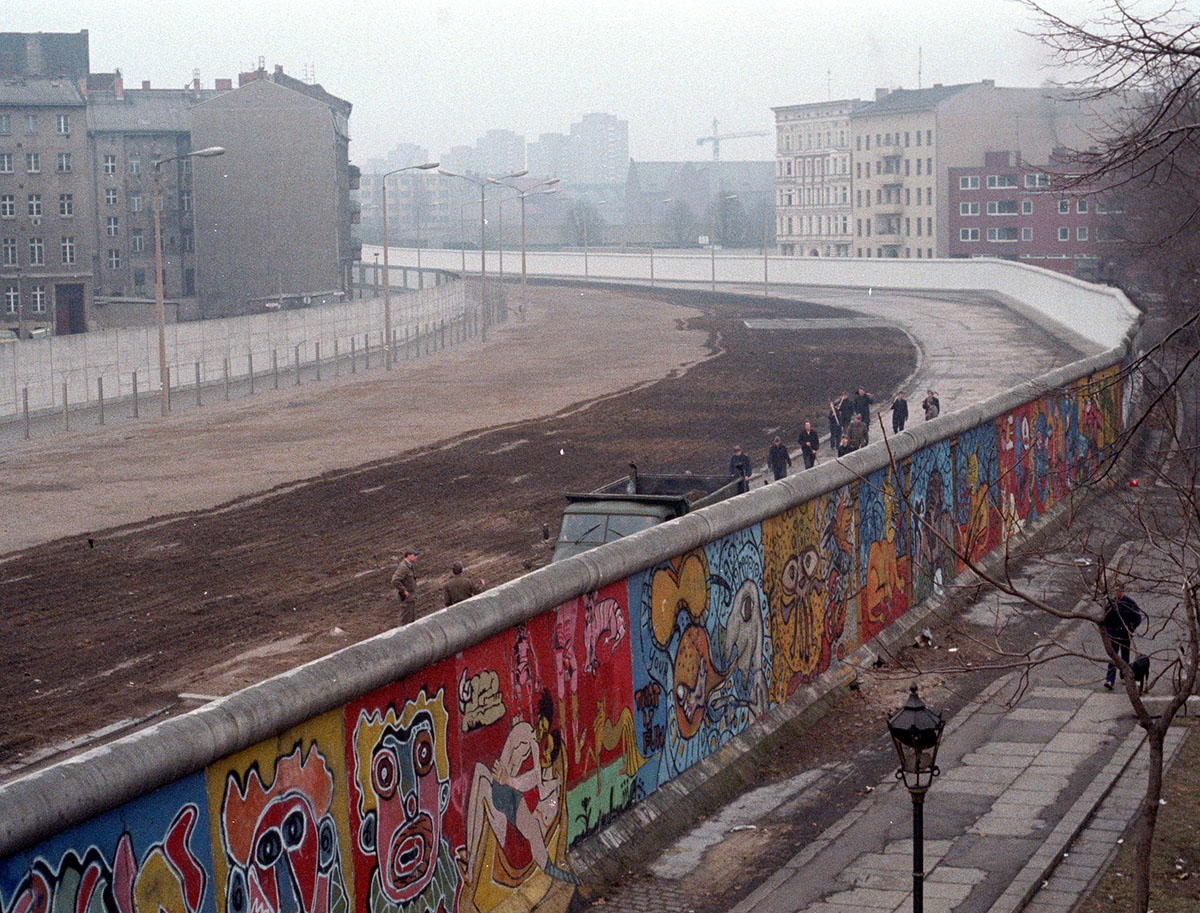
View from the West Berlin side of graffiti art on the Berlin Wall in 1986. The wall's "death strip", on the east side of the wall, here follows the curve of the Luisenstadt Canal (filled in 1932).

- (Vichy France) (Nazi Germany) Atlantic Wall in Nazi-occupied France
- Berlin Wall in Berlin separating West Berlin from East Germany 1961–1989 (in concrete: 1975–1989)
- (South Australia) (Queensland) (New South Wales) Dingo Fence
- (Mongolia) Great Green Wall (China)
- (Pakistan) Inland Customs Line 2,500 miles (4,000 km) built 1843 onward in British India
- India–Pakistan barrier
- Bangladesh–India border
- (Israel) Sections of the Israeli West Bank barrier, West Bank
- Sections of the Blue Line between Lebanon and Israel
- (United Kingdom) Belfast Peace Lines in Belfast, Northern Ireland, UK
- (North Korea) (South Korea) Korean Wall (alleged by DPRK), Korean Demilitarized Zone
- (Morocco) Ceuta border fence, in Ceuta, Autonomous city of Spain
- (Nazi Germany) Maginot Line, in Interwar France
- (Morocco) Melilla border fence in Melilla, Autonomous city of Spain
- (United States) US-Mexico Border, including the Tortilla Wall
- Frontier Closed Area along Hong Kong-China border
- Hungary-Serbia Barrier
- (Western Australia) Rabbit-proof Fence
- Turkey-Syria Barrier
- Turkey-Iran Barrier
- (Slovenia) (Croatia) Slovenian border Barrier
- Pakistan–Afghanistan barrier
- Myanmar-Bangladesh Border Fence
- India–Myanmar Barrier
- Poland–Belarus barrier
- (Sahrawi Arab Democratic Republic) (Morocco) Moroccan Western Sahara Wall

== Memorial walls ==
- Communards' Wall in the Père Lachaise Cemetery, in Paris, France
- (China) Democracy Wall, in Beijing (1978–1979)
- (Czech Republic) Lennon Wall in Prague
- (United States) Vietnam Veterans Memorial, often called the Wall, in Washington, D.C.
- (United States) Pine Grove Cemetery, second-longest contiguous stone wall in the world, in Lynn, Massachusetts
- Lennon Wall in Hong Kong

== Walls in contemporary art and sports ==
- Die Gelbe Wand, Westfalenstadion in Dortmund
- Green Monster, Fenway Park, Boston
- Tsoi Wall in Arbat Street, Moscow
- The Wall in SoHo, New York City
- The Wall In Concert (theatrical) – While based on a figment of a main character's imagination, the concerts in the tour for the Pink Floyd album The Wall featured a real wall of giant cardboard bricks between the band and the audience which was constructed, completed, spoliated and finally destroyed during the course of each show.

== See also ==
- Gum Wall
- Separation barrier
- List of cities with defensive walls
- List of town walls in England and Wales
- List of fortifications
- Great Wall (astronomy)
- List of Egyptian castles, forts, fortifications and city walls
