= Gwaenysgor =

Village in Flintshire, Wales

Coordinates: 53°19′07″N 3°23′23″W

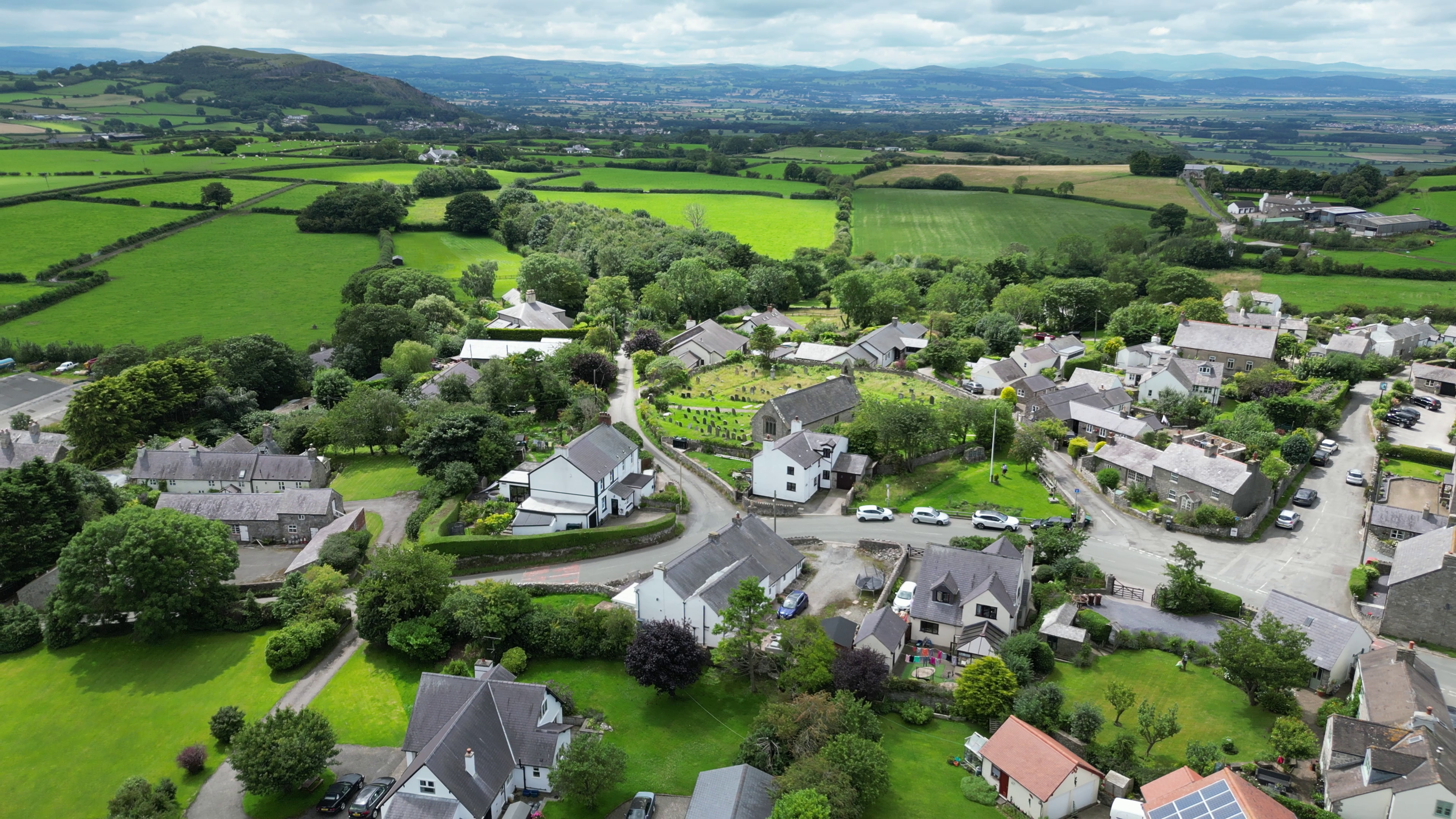
Gwaenysgor

Gwaenysgor is a small village in Flintshire, Wales. Located near Prestatyn in north Wales, it lies at an elevation of 600 feet, 183 metres. There is one pub, the Eagle and Child. The remnants of RAF Prestatyn lie on the hill nearby. (St. Elmo's Summerhouse). It is in the community of Trelawnyd and Gwaenysgor.

== Description ==
Betws Gwaenysgor (grid ref SJ 075 810) perches on the limestone rim of the Clwydian Range, 2 km south-east of Prestatyn at about 183 m (600 ft). Lanes drop north to the coast and south to Dyserth, but the settlement itself is a tight cluster around St Mary Magdalene's church and the Eagle and Child inn. Domesday Book (1086) lists a manor and a ruinous church at "Wenescol". Place-name analysis derives the modern Welsh form from gwaun "moor" and ysgor "fort", giving "marsh by a fort", an echo of the prehistoric occupation attested on nearby Gop Hill. The same survey notes continuous farming on the spur for at least 5,000 years.

St Mary Magdalene's preserves Norman masonry in its south doorway and a thirteenth-century font; the single-cell building gained a Perpendicular east window and an arch-braced roof in the later Middle Ages and retains seventeenth-century fittings, including an oak altar table and a sundial pedestal dated 1663.

A kilometre north-west the summit known locally as Gwaenysgor Mountain holds RAF Prestatyn, an R11 ROTOR radar station completed in 1956 and abandoned in the late 1960s; its Type 14 plinth, operations block and perimeter fencing still dominate the skyline beside modern communication masts. The hilltop also covers the Bronze-Age barrow known as St Elmo's Summerhouse, while the 177-mile Offa's Dyke Path climbs past the site from Prestatyn before dropping east toward Trelawnyd, its way-markers inviting walkers into Betws Gwaenysgor for refreshment.

== History ==
Mentioned in the Domesday Book of 1086 (then referred to as Wenescol), people have lived on this ancient settlement for more than 5000 years.
