= Great Wall of Mexico =

Great Wall of Mexico may refer to:

- The Great Wall of Mexico (short story), a short story written by John Sladek
- A nickname for Tortilla Wall
