= Roman invasion of Caledonia (208–211) =

Campaign of Septimius Severus in Britain

Severan invasion of Caledonia
- Part of Roman conquest of Britain
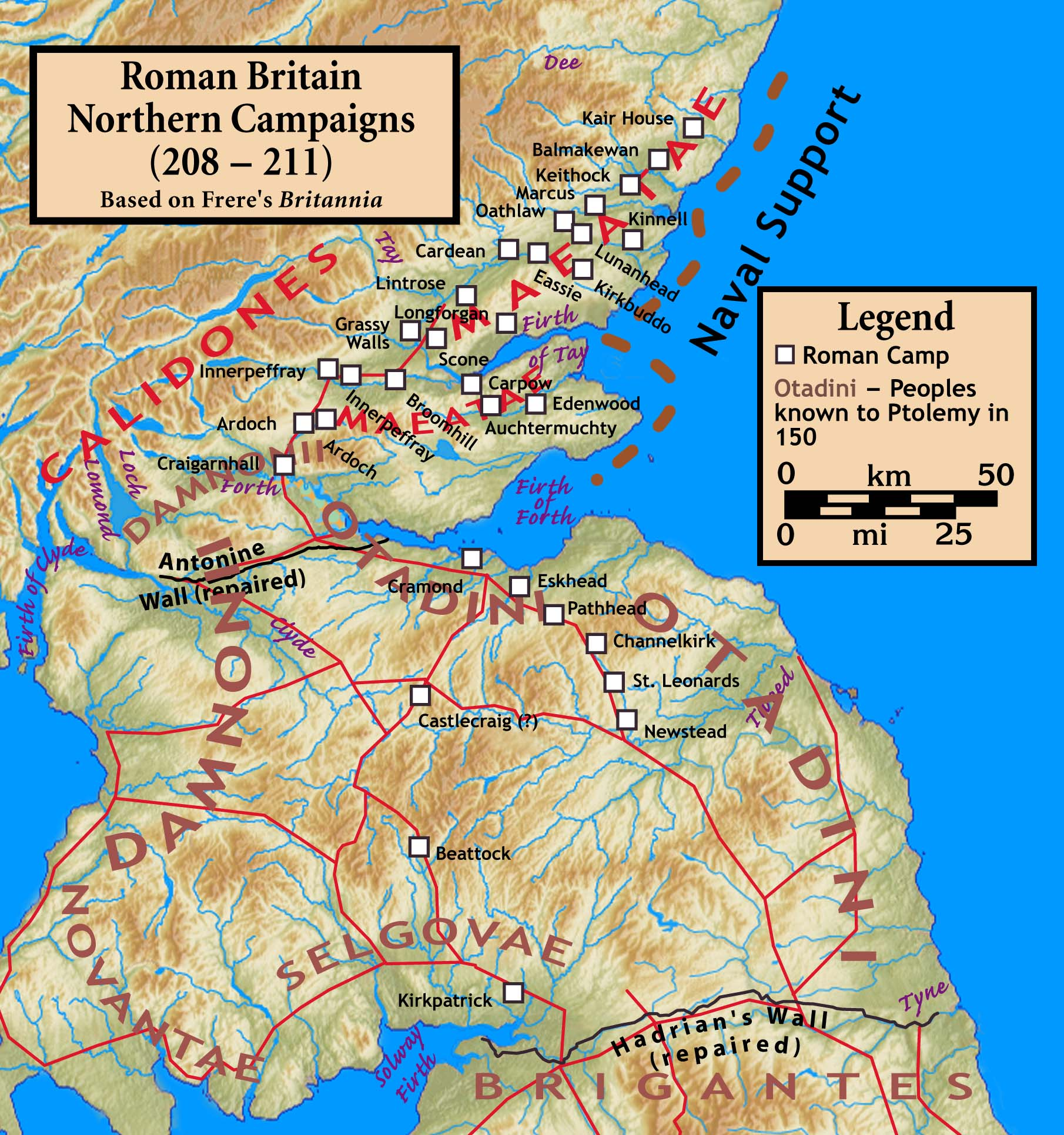
Date	208–211 CE
Location	Caledonia (present-day Scotland)
Result	Roman withdrawal to Hadrian's Wall

Belligerents
Roman Empire	Caledonians

Commanders and leaders
Septimius Severus; Caracalla	Unknown

Casualties and losses
50,000 dead (mostly from disease and exhaustion)	Unknown

The Roman invasion of Caledonia was launched in 208 by the Roman emperor Septimius Severus. The invasion lasted until late 210, when the emperor became ill and died at Eboracum (York) on 4 February 211. The war started well for the Romans with Severus managing to quickly reach the Antonine Wall, but when Severus pushed north into the highlands he became bogged down in a guerrilla war and he was never able to fully subjugate Caledonia. He reoccupied many forts built by Agricola over 100 years earlier, following the Battle of Mons Graupius, and crippled the ability of the Caledonians to raid Roman Britain.

The invasion was abandoned by Severus' son Caracalla and Roman forces once again withdrew to Hadrian's Wall.

== Background ==
The cause of Severus' invasion of Caledonia (modern day Scotland) was a massive increase in raids and attacks on Roman Britain. This was possible because in 195 Clodius Albinus, the Roman Governor of Britain, had led most of the British legions into Gaul during his revolt against Severus. Severus had sent them back to their posts after defeating Albinus, but they had suffered large casualties at the Battle of Lugdunum. This left Hadrian's Wall undermanned and made it easy for the Caledonians to raid into Roman Britain. The Caledonians were also able to gather more men for these raids than before as there is evidence of increased cooperation among the different northern tribes.

== Invasion of Caledonia ==
In 208, Severus arrived in Britain with around 40,000 men and marched north to Hadrian's Wall. Once at Hadrian's Wall Severus initiated a massive rebuilding project which finally made the whole wall into stone (before the western portion had been mostly turf and timber), and served as a barrier against more attacks. After starting the project Severus marched north and occupied all the land between Hadrian's Wall and the Antonine Wall. After completing the occupation Severus began another reconstruction project but this time on the Antonine Wall.

In 209, Severus led his army north into the highlands and roughly marched the same way Agricola had invaded over 100 years before. Severus suffered heavy casualties due to the guerrilla tactics used by the Caledonians. Because of this Severus began a plan of holding down all the territory he could by the reoccupation of many of Agricola's old forts and devastating all the territory he couldn't. This led to many of the tribes attempting to reach a peace agreement with Severus because of fear of extinction through Roman genocide. Peace talks failed and it looked as if the war would continue until all the tribes had submitted to Rome or been exterminated.

In early 210 Severus' son Caracalla led a punitive expedition north of the Antonine wall with the intention of killing everyone he came across and looting and burning everything of value. The plan was for Severus to follow his son's army and permanently occupy all of Caledonia. In 210, Severus became ill and went to York to rest and recover. He kept getting worse until 4 February 211 when he died. Caracalla then called off the war against the Caledonians and headed back to Rome to consolidate his power. Although forts erected by the Roman army of the Severan campaign were placed near those established by Agricola and were clustered at the mouths of the glens in the Highlands, the Caledonians were again in revolt in 210–211 and these were overrun.

The Romans never campaigned deep into Caledonia again because they lacked spare forces to continue dealing with attacks as most manpower was redirected to secure other occupied lands. They soon withdrew south permanently to Hadrian's Wall.

Some epigraphical evidence exists for these military campaigns that show an anticipation of victory against northern tribes. The inscription is presented to the goddess Victoria Brigantia.

== Cassius Dio's account of the invasion ==
Severus, accordingly, desiring to subjugate the whole of it, invaded Caledonia. But as he advanced through the country he experienced countless hardships in cutting down the forests, levelling the heights, filling up the swamps, and bridging the rivers; but he fought no battle and beheld no enemy in battle array. The enemy purposely put sheep and cattle in front of the soldiers for them to seize, in order that they might be lured on still further until they were worn out; for in fact the water caused great suffering to the Romans, and when they became scattered, they would be attacked. Then, unable to walk, they would be slain by their own men, in order to avoid capture, so that a full fifty thousand died. But Severus did not desist until he approached the extremity of the island. Here he observed most accurately the variation of the sun's motion and the length of the days and the nights in summer and winter respectively. Having thus been conveyed through practically the whole of the hostile country (for he actually was conveyed in a covered litter most of the way, on account of his infirmity), he returned to the friendly portion, after he had forced the Britons to come to terms, on the condition that they should abandon a large part of their territory.

== Legacy ==
Although Caracalla withdrew from all the territory taken during the war, the war did have some practical benefits for the Romans. These include the rebuilding of Hadrian's Wall, which once again became the border of Roman Britain. The war also led to the reinforcing of the British frontier, which had been in dire need of reinforcements, and to the weakening of the various Caledonian tribes. It would take many years for them to recover their strength and begin raiding in strength.

== See also ==
- Scotland during the Roman Empire
- Wall of Severus
