= Rushock, Herefordshire =

Coordinates: 52°13′08″N 3°00′55″W

Rushock
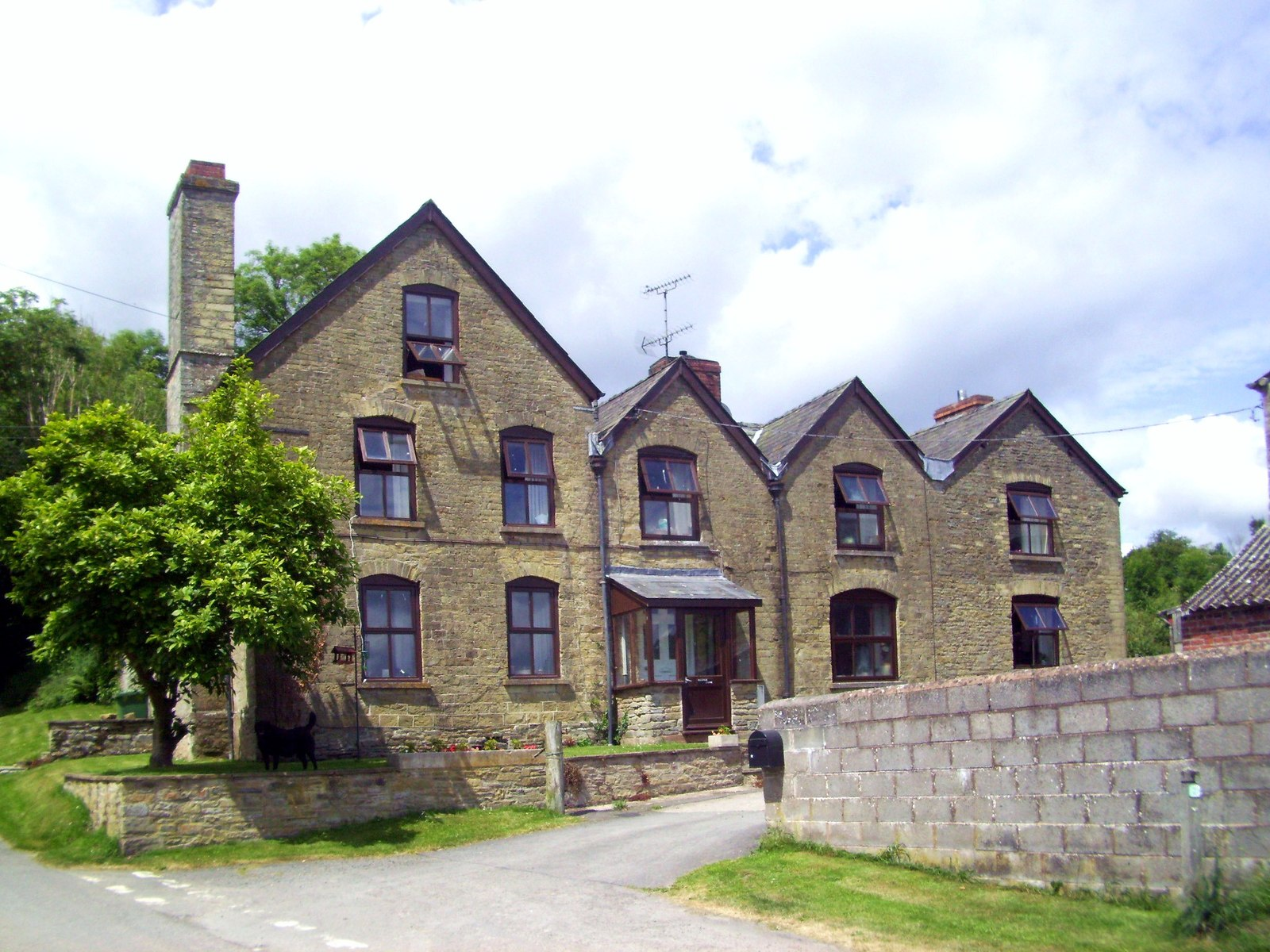
- Big House

- Location within Herefordshire
- Population: 131 (2011 Census)
- Unitary authority: Herefordshire
- Shire county: Herefordshire
- Region: West Midlands
- Country: England
- Sovereign state: United Kingdom
- Post town: Kington
- Postcode district: HR5
- Police: West Mercia
- Fire: Hereford and Worcester
- Ambulance: West Midlands
- UK Parliament: North Herefordshire

Rushock is a small village in Herefordshire, England. It lies about 1 mile north-east of Kington. The population of the civil parish was 131 at the 2011 census.

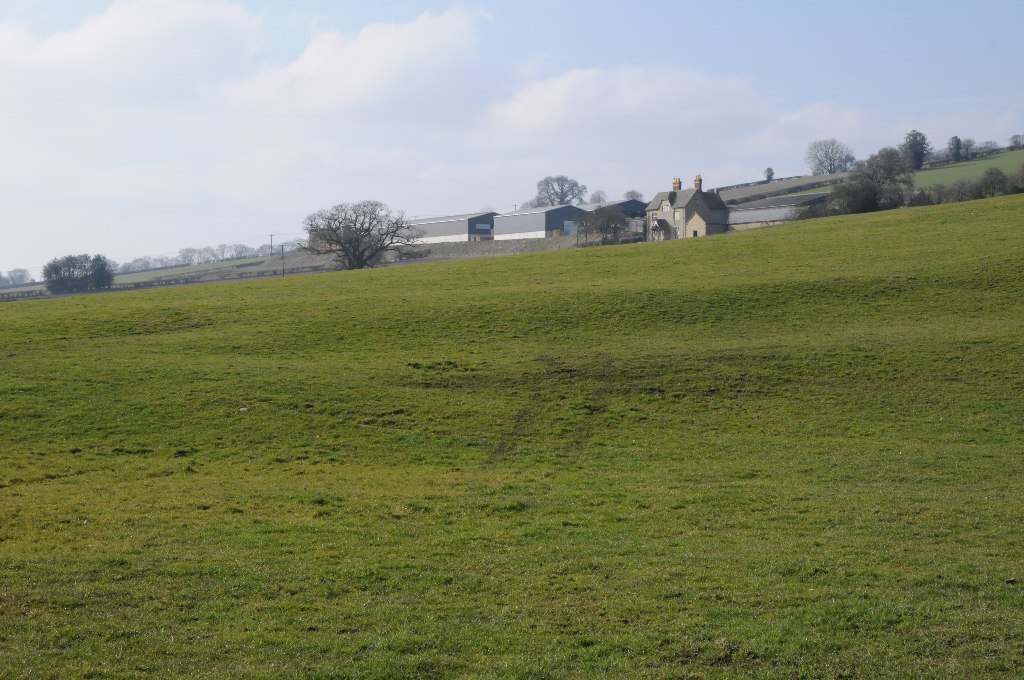
Bank Farm

Rushock was mentioned in the Domesday Book under the name of Ruiscop, when the place was said to be waste. It was later a hamlet in the parish of Kington, and since 1894 has been in the civil parish of Kington Rural.

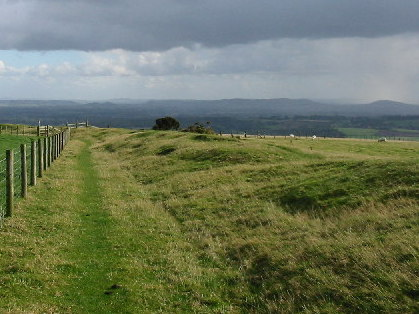
Rushock Hill

Rushock Hill rises to the north-west of the village. A well-preserved section of Offa's Dyke crosses the hill, which some scholars claim is the southern end of the dyke. Offa's Dyke Path also crosses the hill.

Rushock Hill has extensive evidence of ridge and furrow ploughing which extends into a lot of surrounding woodland. Other features include the uncommon site of dry stone walling (not a common local feature) and specimen trees and earthworks which suggest 18th century landscaping. Capability Brown is known to have visited Eywood House in the valley below in Titley and though no evidence of any work being done by him exists the substantial evidence of landscaping suggests that great wealth and imagination were used to greatly alter the hill and surrounding area and would benefit from some modern archaeological investigation.
