= Tortilla Wall =

Border barrier along the Mexico-United States border near San Diego, California

The Tortilla Wall

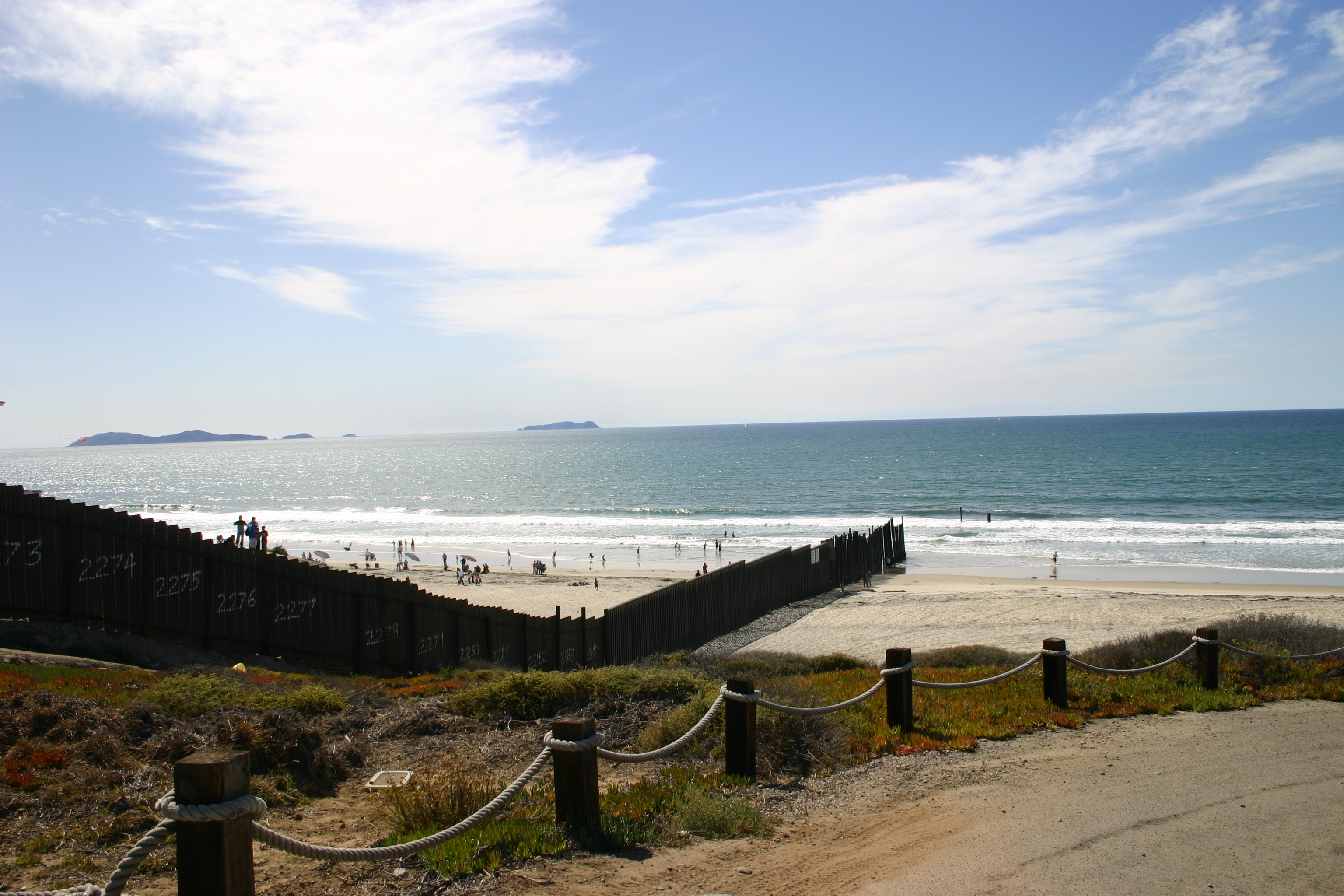
View of Tortilla Wall at the Pacific Ocean

Parts of the wall are built with concrete pillars (bollards) to prevent vehicle crash-throughs

The Tortilla Wall is a term given to a 14-mile (22.5 kilometer) section of United States border fence between the Otay Mesa border crossing in San Diego, California, and the Pacific Ocean.

This "San Diego wall" was completed in the early 1990s. While there are other walls at various points along the border, the Tortilla Wall is the longest to date. No other wall sections have evolved distinct names, so the name is often used to describe the entire set of walled defensive structures.

The Tortilla Wall is marked with graffiti, crosses, photos, pictures and remembrances of migrants who died trying to illegally enter the United States.

== Effectiveness ==
The effectiveness of the wall has been significant according to U.S. Congressional testimony by Representative Ed Royce:

...apprehensions along the region with a security fence dropped from 202,000 in 1992 to 9,000 in 1994.

The building of the Tortilla Wall is generally considered by Mexicans to be an unfriendly gesture. It is a symbol of the controversial immigration issue. It is argued that the wall simply forces illegal border crossings to be moved to the more dangerous area of the Arizona desert.

== Expansion of the wall ==
In 2006, the U.S. Congress passed the Secure Fence Act of 2006 which authorized spending $1.2 billion to build 700 miles (1,100 km) of additional fencing on the southern border facing Mexico.

== Anecdotal wall stories ==
Drug tunnel under the wall. The tunnel was pumped full of concrete after discovery

Tunnels under the wall are still a common way to illegally cross the border. Some tunnels are quite sophisticated. One such tunnel created by smugglers ran from Tijuana to San Diego, was 0.5-mile (0.80 km) long, and included a concrete floor as well as electricity. Other tunnels have included steel rails, while some tunnels are simply dirt passageways or connect to sewer or drain systems.

As a stunt, a circus cannon was placed on the south side of the wall and an acrobat was blasted over the wall into Border Field State Park in the U.S. He had his passport with him.

== See also ==
- List of walls
- Roosevelt Reservation
