= The Gop =

Neolithic mound in Denbighshire, North Wales

Coordinates: 53.3104°N 3.3722°W

The Gop (Welsh: Coparleni, also known as Gop Cairn or Gop-y-Goleuni) is a Neolithic monument lying within the Clwydian Range, northwest of Trelawnyd, in Flintshire, Wales.

== Description ==
Oval in form, it is the second-largest Neolithic mound in Britain after Silbury Hill, in Wiltshire. Sitting on top of Gop Hill (823 feet), a natural outcrop of Carboniferous Limestone, the cairn mound is 75-80m in diameter and 12m high. There is evidence that there was a considerable amount of stone on the top of hill, but excavations have not uncovered a burial chamber or other underground works, which may indicate that it was used as a look-out or hill fort. However prehistoric animal remains were found both in the mound itself and in Gop Cave below. The cave also contained human remains.

In the 17th century, its prominent position allowed a beacon to be placed there.

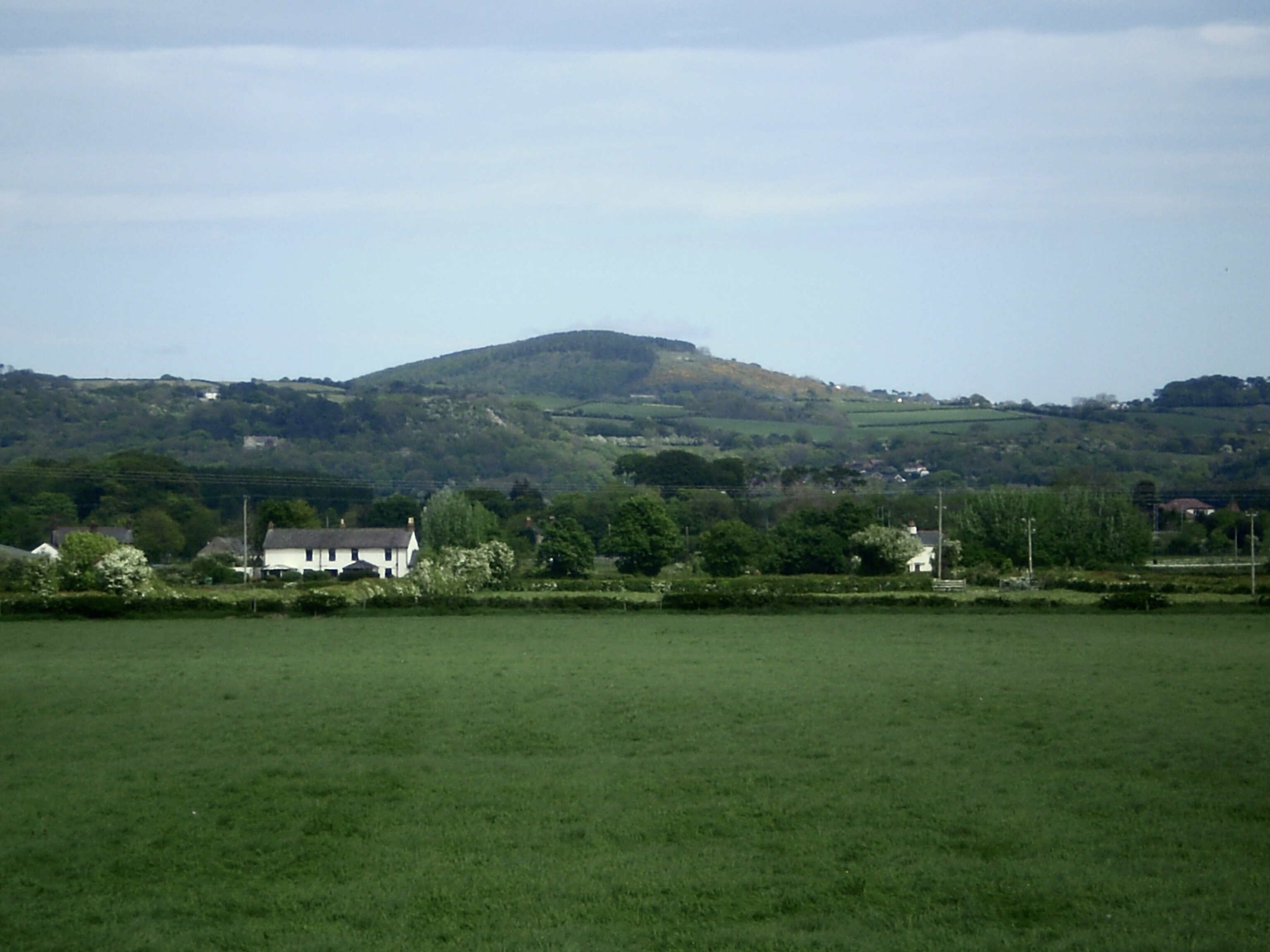
Gop Hill from the River Clwyd
