= Trelawnyd =

Village in Flintshire, Wales

Coordinates: 53.306°N 3.365°W

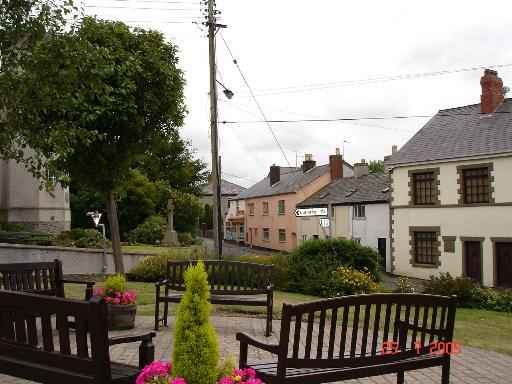
- Trelawnyd

- Location within Flintshire
- Population: 820 (2011)
- OS grid reference: SJ090796
- Community: Trelawnyd and Gwaenysgor
- Principal area: Flintshire
- Country: Wales
- Sovereign state: United Kingdom
- Post town: RHYL
- Postcode district: LL18
- Dialling code: 01745
- Police: North Wales
- Fire: North Wales
- Ambulance: Welsh
- UK Parliament: Clwyd East
- Senedd Cymru – Welsh Parliament: Delyn

Trelawnyd (known as Newmarket from 1710 to 1954) is a village in Flintshire, Wales. The village had a population taken at the 2011 census of 584. It is part of the community of Trelawnyd and Gwaenysgor.

== Governance ==
There is an electoral ward called Trelawnyd and Gwaenysgor. The total population of this ward taken at the 2011 Census was 1,838.

== History ==
Trelawnyd is one of Flintshire's ancient parishes, originally part of Dyserth parish. It became a separate parish between 1254 and 1291, and included the townships of Gop, Graig, Pentreffyddion and Rhydlyfnwyd.

The village was renamed Newmarket (Welsh: Marchnad Newydd) in 1710 by John Wynne who obtained a faculty from the Bishops Registry. Wynne had by then redeveloped much of the village, established several industries, a weekly market, and an annual fair, in an attempt to turn Newmarket into the area's market town. The plan failed as nearby Rhyl developed into the larger market town. The village was renamed back to Trelawnyd in 1954. One unscientific derivation of the name which is frequently found is "tref + llawn + ŷd", "town full of wheat". However, the earlier forms of the name need to be taken into account. Professor Melville Richards of Bangor University, who was Wales's foremost expert on its place names, proposed "tref + *Llyfnwyd", the settlement of a man called Llyfnwyd, but noted that some of the earlier forms also have "rhiw" (= hillside) and "rhyd" (= ford) instead of "tre": Rhiwlyfnwyd (= Llyfnwyd's hill), Rhydlyfnwyd (= Llyfnwyd's ford). The personal name is plausible from the earlier forms, but is not attested. In the “Place-Names of Flintshire” the first element of the name is shown to be originally “rhiw” and “Llyfnwyd” is a Cymricisation of an Anglo-Saxon name Leofnoth which occurs a number of times in the Cheshire and Flintshire section of the Domesday Book. The original meaning of the name Trelawnyd is therefore "slope of Leofnoth", and referred to nearby Gop Hill Leofnoth was a common name in the late Saxon period. “Leof” and “noth” are Old English for “friendly” and “strength” respectively.

Gop Hill ("Y Gop" in Welsh) has a prehistoric cairn mound, claimed to be the biggest in Wales and the second largest in Britain, as well as a cave or rock shelter, discovered in 1886–87.

== Trelawnyd Male Voice Choir ==
In March 1933, 35 villagers formed a choir (Côr Meibion Trelawnyd) to compete at the village Eisteddfod. Within a few months, it grew to 50 members, and has progressed to world renown with about 100 members in 2010.

In 1957, under conductor Neville Owen, a local schoolmaster, they won the National championships which were held at Bala.

In 1973, under conductor Dr. Goronwy Wynne, they again won the National choir championship at Ruthin.
