= Trelawnyd and Gwaenysgor =

Community in Flintshire, Wales

Coordinates: 53°18′50″N 3°22′26″W

Trelawnyd and Gwaenysgor: Welsh: Trelawnyd a Gwaenysgor
- Community
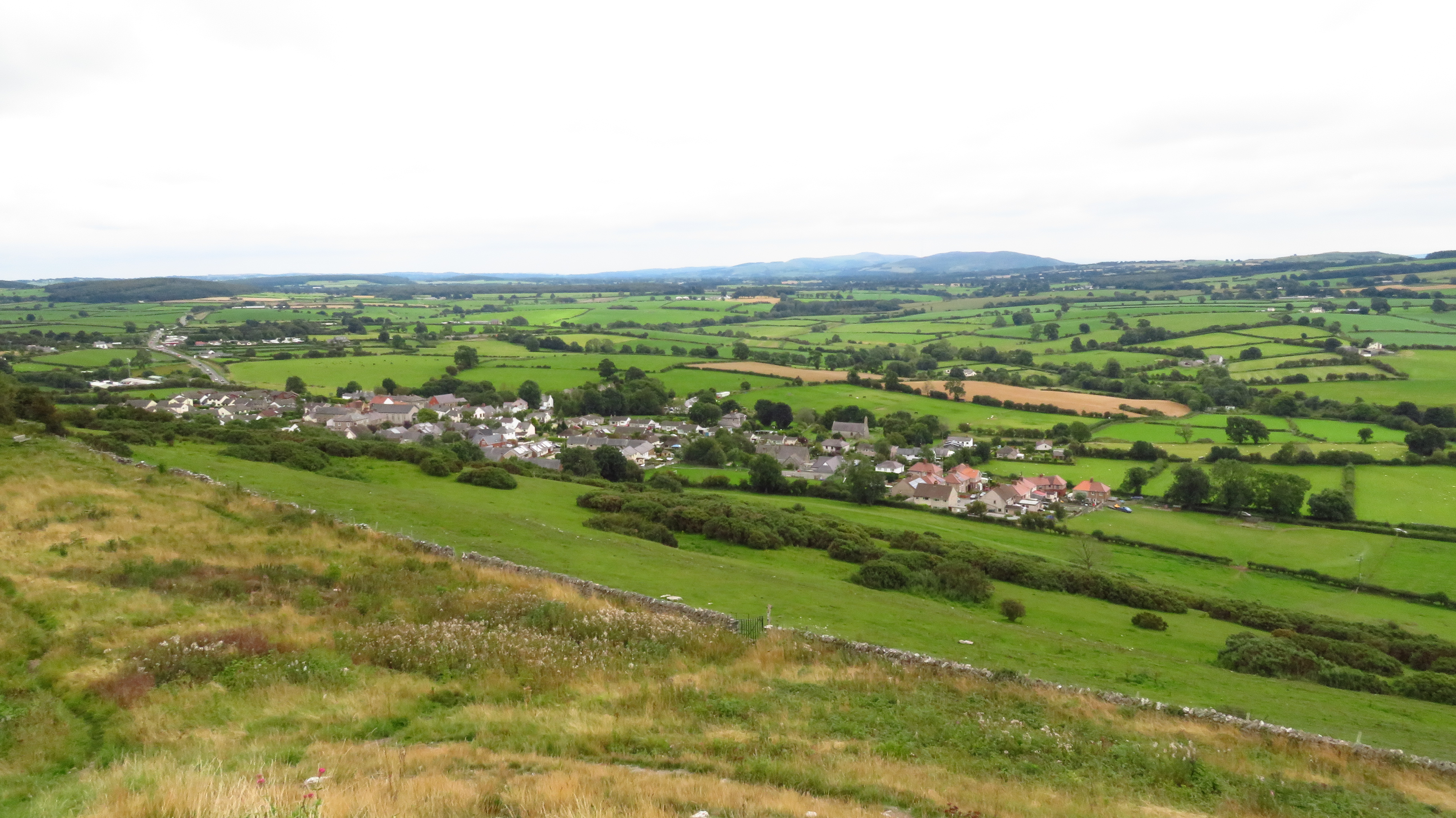
- Trelawnyd as seen from Gop Hill Cairn

- Location within Flintshire
- Population: 1,838 (2011)
- OS grid reference: SJ085805
- Principal area: Flintshire
- Preserved county: Clwyd
- Country: Wales
- Sovereign state: United Kingdom
- Settlements: List: Marian; Gwaenysgor; Trelawnyd
- Post town: Rhyl
- Postcode district: LL18
- Dialling code: 01745
- Police: North Wales
- Fire: North Wales
- Ambulance: Welsh
- UK Parliament: Clwyd East
- Senedd Cymru – Welsh Parliament: Delyn
- Website: Community website
- List of places UK Wales Flintshire Map of the community

Trelawnyd and Gwaenysgor (Welsh: Trelawnyd a Gwaenysgor) is a community in Flintshire, Wales. The community includes the villages of Trelawnyd and Gwaenysgor. The community council is made up of 9 councillors – 6 to represent the Trelawnyd ward and 3 to represent Gwaenysgor.

It is part of the Llanasa and Trelawnyd electoral ward on Flintshire County Council, which elects two councillors. According to the 2011 UK Census the population of the ward was 5,173.
