= RAF Prestatyn =

Former RAF airbase in Wales

RAF Prestatyn
- Prestatyn, Denbighshire in Wales

Site information
- Type: Royal Air Force station
- Owner: Ministry of Defence
- Operator: Royal Air Force

Location
- Shown within Denbighshire RAF Prestatyn (the United Kingdom)
- Coordinates: 53°19′31″N 003°23′10″W

Royal Air Force Prestatyn, or more simply RAF Prestatyn, is a former Royal Air Force radar post situated near Prestatyn, in Denbighshire, north-east Wales. The remains of some of the buildings are current. The rotor station is visible as a square building from most of Prestatyn, as it is situated on Gwaenysgor hill. The area around the post is fenced off as a TV satellite is alongside the buildings.

The radar site was last used in the late 1960s and is now used by Prestatyn Rifle and Pistol target shooting club as their home range

There was once a gun turret mounted out to sea that had a range of up to 5 km (3.1 mi).
