= Wall of Severus =

Roman fortification in northern Britannia

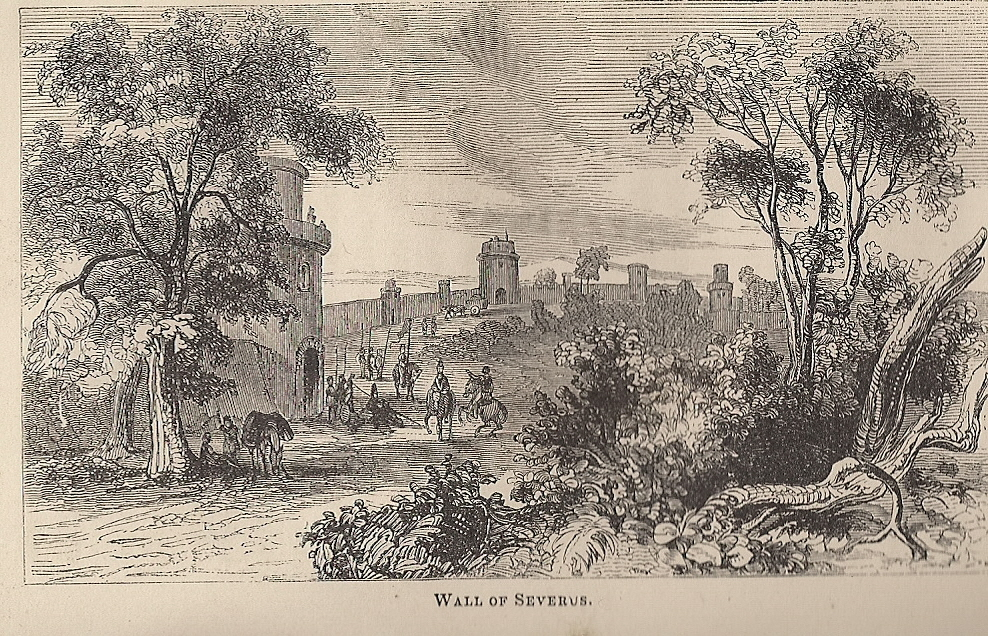
An engraving of the Wall of Severus that appeared in a 19th century American book entitled The History of Alfred the Great.

The Wall of Severus is believed to be a defensive fortification built by the Roman Emperor Septimius Severus (reigned AD 193–211) during his military campaigns in northern Britannia in the early 3rd century. Although the structure is mentioned in several classical texts, its precise location is academically disputed due to inconsistencies between sources. Scholarly consensus believes they are most likely referring to the Antonine Wall. However, Hadrian's Wall and Offa's Dyke have both been suggested as possible candidates. Archaeological evidence has been discovered showing parts of Offa's Dyke, on the England-Wales border, is at least as old as the mid 5th century, predating the 8th-century reign of the Saxon King Offa of Mercia by 300 years.

== Historiography ==
Septimius Severus arrived in Caledonia in 208 after Picts began making a series of attacks and incursions since 197. During these military operations in Scotland, the Wall of Severus was reportedly built. Cassius Dio, a Roman historian who lived at the time of Severus, makes no direct mention to any new fortification but does allude to the existing Antonine and Hadrian Walls. Late Roman historians interchange the name Severan Wall with the Antonine Wall. Other historical writers, such as Bede – an 8th-century English monk in the Anglic Kingdom of Northumbria –, link the fortification with Hadrian's Wall.

Texts that refer to the wall include:

1. Eutropius (late 4th century) writes: "He had his last war in Britain, and to fortify the conquered provinces with all security, he built a wall for 132 miles from sea to sea. He died at York, a reasonably old man, in the sixteenth year and third month of his reign." (Eutropius, Historiae Romanae Breviarium viii 19.1, written in AD 369)
2. Historia Augusta (probably late 4th century), within the Life of Severus, mentions: "He built a wall across the island of Britain from sea to sea, and thus made the province secure — the crowning glory of his reign; in recognition thereof he was given the name Britannicus." (Historia Augusta, Life of Severus, 18:2, written around AD 395)
3. Bede (8th century) writes: "In the year of our lord 189 (AD), Severus became emperor (of Rome)... being of a harsh disposition and engaged in many wars, he governed the state vigorously, but with much trouble, having been victorious in all the grievous civil wars that occurred in his time, he was drawn into Britain by a revolt of almost all the confederated tribes, and after many great and severe battles, he thought fit to divide that part of the island that he recovered from the other unconquered nations, not with a wall as some have imagined but with a rampart, for a wall is made of stones. A rampart for which camps are fortified to repel enemies is made of sods cut out of the ground and raised high above the ground like a wall, having in front of it a trench from whence the sods were taken, with strong stakes of wood afitted above it. Thus Severus drew a great trench and rampart fortified with several towers from sea to sea, and there at York afterwards he fell sick and died."
4. Asser (9th century), writing in The Life of King Alfred: "The wall was a good defence as long as Roman soldiers remained to guard it. But in process of time – about two centuries after Severus's day – the Roman empire itself began to decline, even in the very seat and centre of its power; and then, to preserve their own capital from destruction, the government were obliged to call their distant armies home."
5. Nennius, Historia Brittonum ("History of the Britons", 9th century), Chapter 23: "Severus was the third emperor who passed the sea to Britain, where, to protect the provinces recovered from barbaric incursions, he ordered a wall and rampart to be made between the Britons, the Scots, and the Picts, extending across the island from sea to sea, in length one hundred and thirty-three miles: and it is called in the British language Gwal. (*) Moreover, he ordered it to be made between the Britons, and the Picts, and Scots; for the Scots from the west, and the Picts from the north, unanimously made war against the Britons; but were at peace among themselves. Not long after Severus dies in Britain."
  (*) Or "the wall". One manuscript here adds: "The above-mentioned Severus constructed it of rude workmanship in length 132 miles; i.e. from Penguaul, which village is called in Scottish Cenail, in English Penteltun, to the mouth of the river Cluth and Cairpentaloch, where this wall terminates; but it was of no avail. The emperor Carausius afterwards rebuilt it, and fortified it with seven castles between the two mouths: he built also a round house of polished stones on the banks of the river Carun (Carron): he likewise erected a triumphal arch, on which he inscribed his own name in memory of his victory."
6. William of Malmesbury's Chronicle of the Kings of England (early 12th century), a translation of William of Malmesbury's Gesta regum Anglorum, and a reading of the original Latin both assert: "Severus and Constantius, two of their greatest princes, died upon the island, and were there interred with the utmost pomp. The former, to defend this province from the incursions of the barbarians, built his celebrated and well-known wall from sea to sea." (Chapter 1/Cap I) AD1096/IC CVI

== Existence ==
As the location of the wall remains undetermined, its existence was academically questioned in the early 20th century because there is no evidence that Severus built any fortifications during his time in Britain. Current academic consensus believes that Severus' campaigns involved repairing and strengthening the abandoned Antonine Wall before falling back to Hadrian's Wall.

== Sources ==
- Wall of Severus
- The literary sources for the ‘Wall of Severus’
