= Wat's Dyke =

Linear earthwork in Wales and England

Coordinates: 52°59′12″N 3°1′43″W

- Clawdd Wat
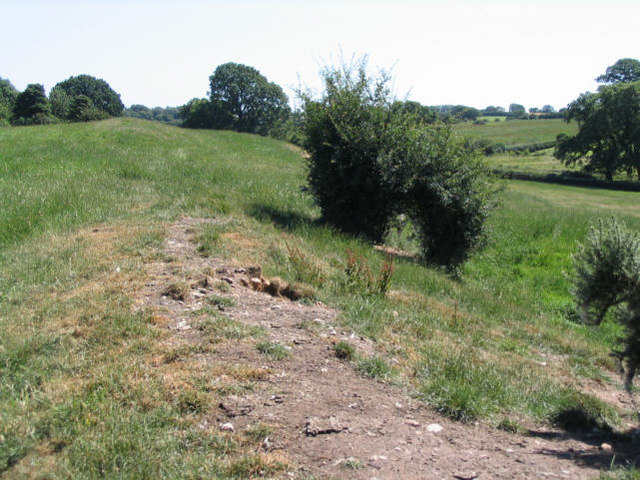
- Wat's Dyke near Northop, Wales
- Interactive map of Wat's Dyke
- Location: England–Wales border
- Type: Earthwork
- Material: Earth
- Length: Up to 40 mi (64 km)
- Completion date: 8th century

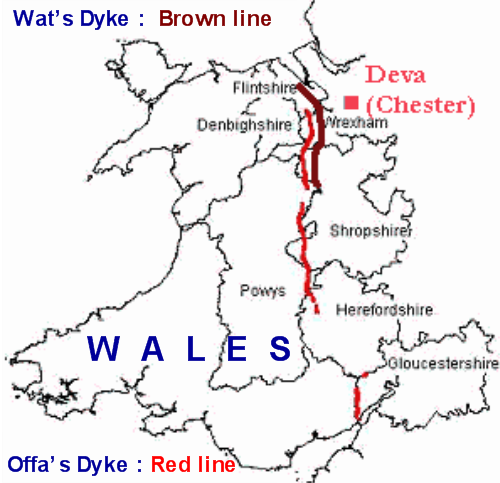
Wat's Dyke in brown; Offa's Dyke in red

Wat's Dyke (Welsh: Clawdd Wat) is a 40-mile (64 km) linear earthwork running through the northern Welsh Marches from Basingwerk Abbey on the River Dee estuary, passing east of Oswestry and on to Maesbury in Shropshire, England. It runs generally parallel to Offa's Dyke, sometimes within a few yards but never more than three miles (5 km) away. It now appears insignificant and is visible in some places as a raised hedgerow and in others no more than a cropmark. The ditch has long since been filled in and the bank ploughed away, but originally it was a considerable construction, considered to be strategically more sophisticated than Offa's Dyke. The date of construction is disputed, ranging from sub-Roman to the early ninth century.

== Construction and siting ==
It consists of the usual bank and ditch of an ancient dyke, with the ditch on the western side, meaning that the dyke faces Wales and by implication can be seen as protecting the English lands to the east. The placement of the dyke in the terrain also shows that care was taken to provide clear views to the west and to use local features to the best defensive advantage.

A section of the dyke extends north and south from Old Oswestry, an Iron Age hill fort.

== Dating controversy ==
The dyke was previously thought to date to the early 8th century, constructed by Æthelbald, king of Mercia, who reigned from 716 to 757. Æthelbald's successor, Offa, built the dyke which carries his name at some point during his reign (757 to 796).

Excavations in the 1990s at Maes-y-Clawdd near Oswestry uncovered the remains of a small fire site together with eroded shards of Romano-British pottery and quantities of charcoal, which have been dated to between 411 and 561 AD (centered around 446 AD). This evidence would seem to place the building of the dyke in the era of the post-Roman kingdom whose capital was at Wroxeter (just south of modern-day Shrewsbury) about 10 miles (16 km) to the east.

The dating of the fire site and hence the dyke has been disputed, and it has been suggested that owing to the difficulties inherent in radiocarbon dating, this single date cannot be fully trusted and also that the dyke could easily have been built on top of the fire site at a later date.

Excavations in 2006 suggested a much later date of 792–852, and the earlier date is now thought to relate to a fire site of a sub-Roman earthwork which preceded the actual dyke. It has been tentatively suggested that the likely context for construction is in the 820s, when the Mercian king Coenwulf was fighting against a resurgent Welsh threat.

== Wat's Dyke Way ==
The approximate line of the earthwork is followed by the Wat's Dyke Way, a waymarked long-distance path running for 61 miles (98 km) from Llanymynech in Powys to Basingwerk Abbey on the River Dee near Holywell. It was opened in 2007.

== See also ==
- Wansdyke, a similar earthwork created during sub-Roman decades in Wiltshire and Somerset
- Scots' Dike, a 3 1/2-mile (6 km) linear earthwork constructed in 1552 to mark the division of the Debatable Lands and thereby settle the exact boundary between the Kingdoms of Scotland and England, on the Anglo-Scottish border
- Black Pig's Dyke in Ireland
- Broadclough Dykes in Lancashire
