= Offa's Dyke =

Ancient earthwork in the United Kingdom

Coordinates: 52.344°N 3.049°W

- Clawdd Offa
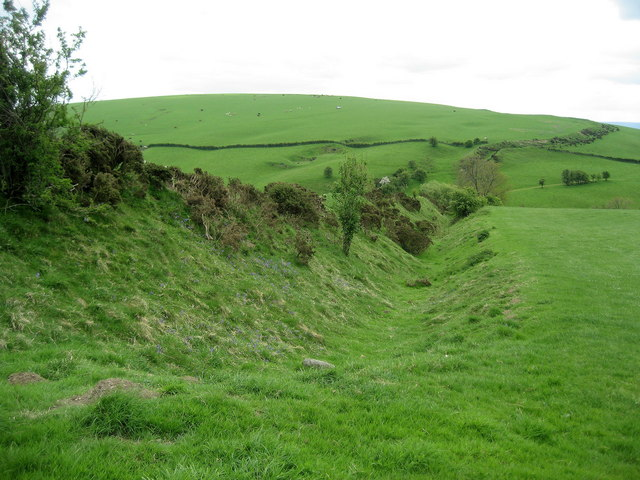
- Offa's Dyke near Clun, Shropshire, England
- Interactive map of Offa's Dyke
- Location: England–Wales border
- Designer: King Offa
- Type: Earthwork
- Material: Earth
- Length: 82 mi (132 km) but covers an area of up to 150 mi (240 km)
- Width: 20 m (66 ft)
- Height: 2.5 m (8 ft 2 in)
- Completion date: 784 CE

Offa's Dyke (Welsh: Clawdd Offa) is a large linear earthwork that roughly follows the border between England and Wales. The structure is named after Offa, the Anglo-Saxon king of Mercia from 757 to 796 CE, who is traditionally believed to have ordered its construction, although modern archaeological evidence shows far earlier origins and its original purpose is debated.

It delineated the border between Anglian Mercia and the Welsh kingdoms (such as Powys and Gwent), though a 2014 study indicated a roughly late 6th century date for one part of the dyke (Radiocarbon dates are 430–652 CE with 95% confidence) suggesting Offa expanded existing fortifications.

The earthwork, which was up to 65 feet (20 m) wide (including its flanking ditch) and 8 feet (2.4 m) high, traversed low ground, hills and rivers. Today, it is protected as a scheduled monument. Some of its route is followed by the Offa's Dyke Path, a 177-mile (285 km) long-distance footpath that runs between Liverpool Bay in the north and the Severn Estuary in the south.

Although the dyke has conventionally been dated to the Early Middle Ages of Anglo-Saxon England, research in recent decades—using techniques such as radiocarbon dating—has challenged the conventional historiography and theories about the earthwork and showed that construction was started in the late 6th century, during the sub-Roman period.

== History ==
=== Background ===
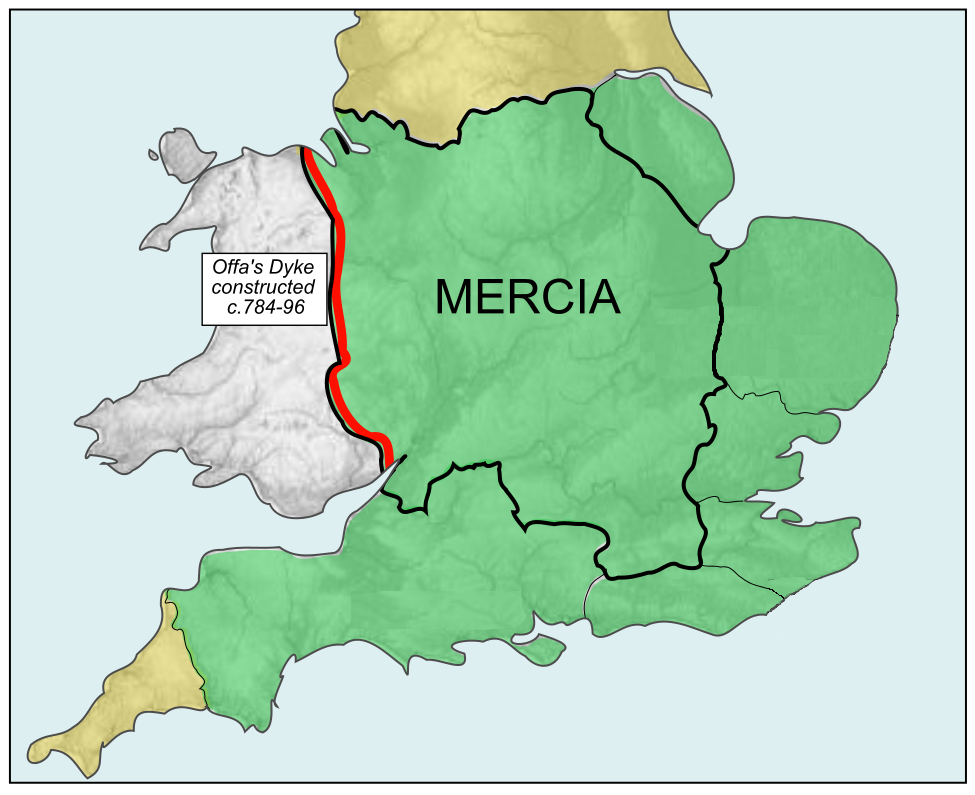
The extent of Mercia during the Mercian Supremacy, showing the line of Offa's Dyke (red)

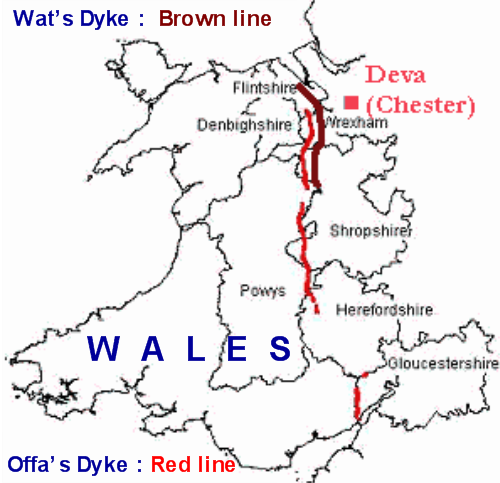
Wat's Dyke in brown; Offa's Dyke in red

Schematic cross-section of Offa's Dyke, showing the design intended to protect Mercia against attacks from Powys

The generally accepted theory of the earthwork attributes most of its construction to Offa, king of Mercia from 757 to 796 CE. The structure did not represent a mutually agreed boundary between the Mercians and the Kingdom of Powys. It had a ditch on the Welsh (western) side, with the displaced soil piled into a bank on the Mercian (eastern) side. This suggests that Mercians constructed it as a defensive earthwork, or to demonstrate the power and intent of their kingdom.

Throughout its entire length, the dyke provides an uninterrupted view from Mercia into Wales. Where the earthwork encounters hills or high ground, it passes to the west of them.

Although historians often overlook Offa's reign because of limitations in source material, he ranks as one of the greatest Anglo-Saxon rulers – as evidenced in his ability to raise the workforce and resources required to construct the dyke. Those requirements were immense – when Michael Wood approached motorway contractors in the late 1970s regarding potential costs in present terms they "threw up their hands in dismay ... impossible, they said." The construction of the earthwork probably involved a corvée system requiring vassals to build certain lengths of the earthwork for Offa in addition to performing their normal services to their king. The Tribal Hidage, a primary document, shows the distribution of land within 8th-century Britain; it shows that peoples were located within specified territories for administration.

=== Early scholarship ===
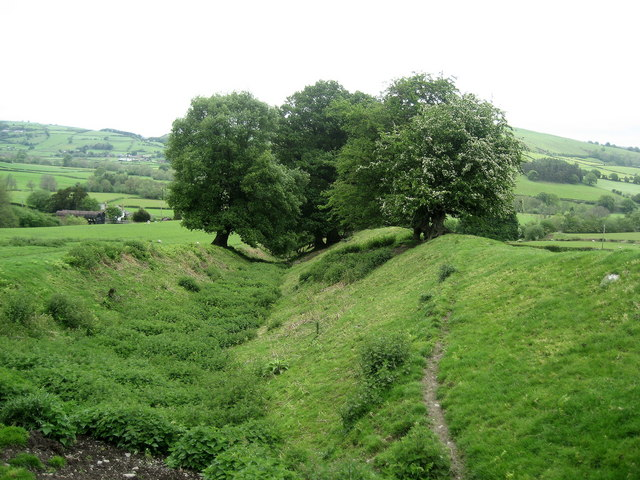
Offa's Dyke near Presteigne, Powys

The first historians and archaeologists to examine the dyke compared their conclusions with the late 9th-century writer Asser, who wrote, "there was in Mercia in fairly recent time a certain vigorous king called Offa, who terrified all the neighbouring kings and provinces around him, and who had a great dyke built between Wales and Mercia from sea to sea". In 1955, Cyril Fox published the first major survey of the dyke. He concurred with Asser that the earthwork ran "from sea to sea", theorising that the dyke ran from the River Dee estuary in the north to the River Wye in the south: approximately 150 miles (240 km). Although Fox observed that Offa's Dyke was not a continuous linear structure, he concluded that earthworks were raised in only those areas where natural barriers did not already exist.

Historian Frank Stenton accepts Fox's conclusions. He wrote the introduction to Fox's account of the dyke. Although Fox's work has now been revised to some extent, it still remains a vital record of some stretches of Offa's Dyke that still existed between 1926 and 1928, when his three field surveys took place, but have since been destroyed.

=== Later research ===
In 1978, Dr. Frank Noble challenged some of Fox's conclusions, stirring up new academic interest in Offa's Dyke. His thesis entitled "Offa's Dyke Reviewed" (1978) raises several questions concerning the accepted historiography of Offa's Dyke. Noble postulates that the gaps in the Dyke were not the incorporation of natural features as defensive barriers, but instead the gaps were a "ridden boundary", perhaps incorporating palisades, that left no archaeological trace. Noble also helped establish the Offa's Dyke Association, which maintains the Offa's Dyke Path. This long-distance footpath mostly follows the route of the dyke and is a designated British National Trail.

John Davies writes of Fox's study: "In the planning of it, there was a degree of consultation with the kings of Powys and Gwent. On the Long Mountain near Trelystan, the dyke veers to the east, leaving the fertile slopes in the hands of the Welsh; near Rhiwabon, it was designed to ensure that Cadell ap Brochwel retained possession of the Fortress of Penygadden." And for Gwent, Offa had the dyke built "on the eastern crest of the gorge, clearly with the intention of recognizing that the River Wye and its traffic belonged to the kingdom of Gwent".

Ongoing research and archaeology on Offa's Dyke has been undertaken for many years by the Extra-Mural Department of the University of Manchester. Interviews with Dr. David Hill, broadcast in episode 1 of In Search of the Dark Ages (aired in 1979), show support for Noble's idea. Most recently, Hill and Margaret Worthington have undertaken considerable research on the dyke. Their work, though far from finished, has demonstrated that there is little evidence for the dyke stretching from sea to sea. Rather, they claim that it is a shorter structure stretching from Rushock Hill north of the Herefordshire Plain to Llanfynydd, near Mold, Flintshire, some 64 miles (103 km). According to Hill and Worthington, dykes in the far north and south may have different dates, and though they may be connected with Offa's Dyke, there is as yet no compelling evidence behind this.

=== Contrary evidence ===
Ofer means 'border' or 'edge' in Old English, giving rise to the possibility of alternative derivations for some border features associated with Offa. Roman historian Eutropius in his book Historiae Romanae Breviarium, written around 369, mentions the Wall of Severus, a structure built by Septimius Severus, who was Roman Emperor between 193 and 211:

Novissimum bellum in Britannia habuit, utque receptas provincias omni securitate muniret, vallum per CXXXIII passuum milia a mari ad mare deduxit. Decessit Eboraci admodum senex, imperii anno sexto decimo, mense tertio. Historiae Romanae Breviarium, viii 19.1

Translation: He had his most recent war in Britain, and to fortify the conquered provinces with all security, he built a wall for 133 miles from sea to sea. He died at York, a reasonably old man, in the sixteenth year and third month of his reign.

This source is conventionally thought to be referring, in error, to either Hadrian's Wall, 73 miles (117 km), or the Antonine Wall, 37 miles (60 km), which were both shorter and built in the 2nd century. Recently, some writers have suggested that Eutropius may have been referring to the earthwork later called Offa's Dyke. Most archaeologists reject this theory.

Bede also mentions the barrier built by Septimus Severus, but Bede says that the rampart was made of earth and timber, a description which would closer match Offa's Dyke than Hadrian's Wall, though it would describe the Antonine Wall:

After many great and severe battles, (Severus) thought fit to divide that part of the island, which he had recovered, from the other unconquered nations, not with a wall, as some imagine, but with a rampart. For a wall is made of stones, but a rampart, with which camps are fortified to repel the assaults of enemies, is made of sods, cut out of the earth, and raised high above the ground, like a wall, having in front of it the trench whence the sods were taken, with strong stakes of wood fixed above it. Thus Severus drew a great trench and strong rampart, fortified with several towers, from sea to sea. Bede's Ecclesiastical History of England, Bk 1-5

However, the solution to the problem lies a few chapters later in Bede's account. In Book One Chapter Twelve of Bede's Ecclesiastical History, he writes that the Romans "built a strong wall of stone directly from sea to sea in a straight line between the towns that had been built as strong-points, where Severus had built his earthwork ... straight from east to west". The strong wall of stone cannot refer to the Antonine Wall or Offa's Dyke, so it clearly refers to Hadrian's Wall, especially as Offa's Dyke runs from north to south. Also, as Severus's earthwork is described as being in the same location as Hadrian's Wall, it cannot be Offa's Dyke either, so the earth rampart with a great trench that Bede refers to must be the Vallum, the adjoining earthen barrier immediately south of Hadrian's Wall. Bede inadvertently attributes the Vallum to Septimius Severus, saying that it predated the wall. In fact the Vallum was the work of Hadrian and slightly post-dated the wall.

Evidence has also been found that challenges the accepted date of the construction of Offa's Dyke. In December 1999, Shropshire County Council archaeologists uncovered the remains of a hearth or fire on the original ground surface beneath Wat's Dyke near Oswestry. Carbon dating analysis of the burnt charcoal and burnt clay in situ showed it was covered by earth around 446. Archaeologists concluded that this part of Wat's Dyke, so long thought of as Anglo-Saxon and a mid-8th-century contemporary of Offa's Dyke, was built 300 years earlier in the post-Roman period.

In 2014, excavations by the Clwyd-Powys Archaeological Trust focused on nine samples of the dyke near Chirk. Radiocarbon dating of redeposited turf resulted in a series of dates. In one section, these ranged from 430 to 652 and in another section from 887 to 1019: confirming that the bank is clearly post-Roman and that at least some rebuilding work took place after Offa's reign. It has been suggested that Offa's Dyke may have been a long-term project by several Mercian kings. Further excavations on the dyke at Chirk Castle found well-preserved remains of the ditch under later parkland; radiocarbon samples were recovered, but the results have not yet been made public.

== Current ==
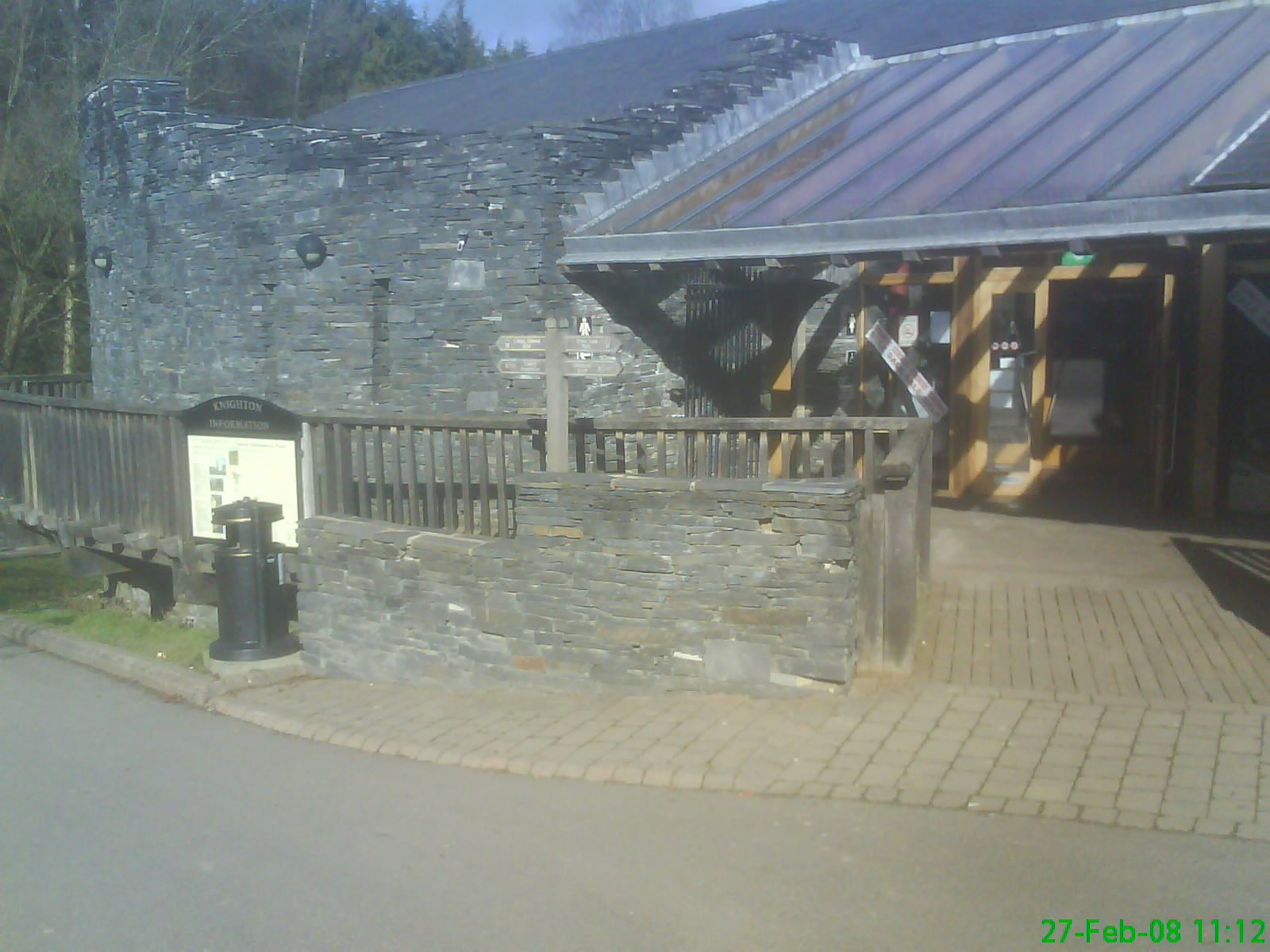
Offa's Dyke Centre at Knighton, Powys

The England–Wales border still mostly passes within a few miles of the course of Offa's Dyke through the Welsh Marches. The dyke has a cultural significance, symbolising the separation between England and Wales, similar to Hadrian's Wall between England and Scotland in the Scottish Marches. George Borrow, in his Wild Wales (1862), drawn from folklore, claimed that:

[It] was customary for the English to cut off the ears of every Welshman who was found to the east of the dyke, and for the Welsh to hang every Englishman whom they found to the west of it.

A three-mile (five-kilometre) section of the dyke which overlooks Tintern Abbey and includes the Devil's Pulpit near Chepstow is now managed by English Heritage. All sections of Offa's Dyke that survive as visible earthworks, or as infilled but undeveloped ditch, are designated as a scheduled monument. However, some parts of the dyke may also remain buried under later development. Some sections are also defined as Sites of Special Scientific Interest, including stretches within the Lower Wye Valley SSSI and the Highbury Wood National Nature Reserve. Parts are located within the Wye Valley and Shropshire Hills Areas of Outstanding Natural Beauty. Most of the line of Offa's Dyke is designated as a public right of way, including those sections which form part of the Offa's Dyke Path.

In August 2013, a 45-metre (148 ft) section of dyke, between Chirk and Llangollen, was destroyed by a local landowner. The destruction of the dyke to build a stable was said to be like "driving a road through Stonehenge", but the perpetrator escaped punishment.

The Offa's Dyke Centre is a purpose-built information centre in the town of Knighton, on Offa's Dyke on the border between England (Shropshire) and Wales (Powys). Some of the best remains of the earthworks can be seen within a two-minute walk from the centre. The Offa's Dyke Path (Welsh: Llwybr Clawdd Offa) is a long-distance footpath close to the England–Wales border. Although large sections are close to the dyke, the path is longer and in some places passes at some distance from the earthworks. Opened in 1971, the path is one of Britain's longest national trails, stretching for 283 km (176 mi) from the Severn estuary at Sedbury, near Chepstow, to Prestatyn on the north Wales coast.

== See also ==
- Wansdyke
- Danevirke (contemporary Danish dyke)

== Bibliography ==
- Asser (1957). Stevenson, William H. (ed.). Asser's Life of King Alfred. With an article by Dorothy Whitelock. Oxford: Clarendon Press. OCLC 3104691. "Standard edition of the Latin original."
- Fox, Cyril (1955). Offa's Dyke: A Field Survey of the Western Frontier Works of Mercia in the Seventh and Eighth Centuries AD. London: Oxford University Press for the British Academy. OCLC 656087884.
- Hill, David; Worthington, Margaret (2003). Offa's Dyke: History and Guide. Stroud: Tempus. ISBN 9780752419589.
- Ray, Keith; Bapty, Ian (2016). Offa's Dyke: Landscape and Hegemony in Eighth Century Britain. Oxbow Books. ISBN 978-1-905119-35-6.
- Noble, Frank (1978). Offa's Dyke Reviewed (MPhil thesis). Milton Keynes: Open University. "Partly published in Offa's Dyke Reviewed, ed. Margaret Gelling (Oxford: British Archaeological Reports, 1983)"
- Tyler, D. J. (2011). "Offa's Dyke: A Historiographical Appraisal". Journal of Medieval History. 37 (2): 145–161. doi:10.1016/j.jmedhist.2011.03.001.
