= List of scheduled monuments in Monmouthshire =

Monmouthshire has 200 scheduled monuments. The 46 prehistoric scheduled sites include burial sites, enclosures and 16 hill forts. Ten sites date from the Roman period, including four villas. There are four early Christian sites from early medieval times. The 101 sites from the medieval post-Norman period include castles and hidden castle mounds, remote dwellings, grand abbeys, holy wells, stones and churches. Finally the modern period has a 39 sites, including a very wide range of early industrial activities.

Scheduled monuments have statutory protection. The compilation of the list is undertaken by Cadw Welsh Historic Monuments, which is an executive agency of the Welsh Government. The list of scheduled monuments below is supplied by Cadw with additional material from RCAHMW and Glamorgan-Gwent Archaeological Trust.

== Scheduled monuments in Monmouthshire ==
Image	Name	Site type	Community	Location	Details	Historic County	Period (Note: The Cadw spreadsheet lists sites by very broad categories, for example, Prehistoric covers Paleolithic to Iron Age. Where possible, the Period has been changed, based on the (cited) records from Coflein and/or GGAT.)	SAM No & Refs
	Gray Hill Stone Circle	Stone circle	Caerwent	51.6379°N 2.8136°W, ST437935	Fourteen visible stones, nine of which lie on their sides end to end, forming a circle. Possibly curb stones for a burial mound, or a stone circle.	Monmouthshire	Bronze Age	MM031
Thornwell Farm Neolithic Burial Chamber	Thornwell Farm burial mounds	Chambered long barrow	Chepstow	51.6213°N 2.6673°W, ST539916	Two burial mounds now within a Chepstow housing estate. One may be a Neolithic long barrow, with stone chambers. The other is a Bronze Age round barrow.	Monmouthshire	Neolithic	MM206
St Peter's Cave	St Peter's Cave	Cave	Chepstow	51.6313°N 2.6677°W, ST538927	A very wet cave under the cliffs of the Chepstow Bulwarks	Monmouthshire	Prehistoric	MM160
	Llangibby Bottom Standing Stone	Standing stone	Llangybi	51.6628°N 2.8971°W, ST380963	The 1.7 m high stone is in 'Priest's Meadow', and is claimed to be the spot where St Cybi pitched his tent when arriving in the 6th century. Also known as Waen-y-'Ffeirad.	Monmouthshire	Bronze Age	MM106
	Heston Brake Long Barrow	Long barrow	Portskewett	51.5946°N 2.7154°W, ST505886	Evidence of a significant neolithic chambered tomb or long barrow. A small group of puddingstones mark the entrance of the site. Human skeletons, cattle bones and some pottery were discovered in the chamber when it was excavated in 1888.	Monmouthshire	Neolithic	MM018
Brown triangular stone at edge of grassy field near fence and bank of motorway	Llanfihangel Rogiet Standing Stone	Standing stone	Rogiet	51.586°N 2.8022°W, ST445877	A triangular tapered standing stone, 2.4 m high, and 1.6 m by 0.5 m at the base. Also known as The Devil's Quoit.	Monmouthshire	Bronze Age?	MM068
Three upright stones supporting a tilting large flat stone, with other stones nearby. All on a grassy mound next to a field hedge.	Gaerllwyd Burial Chamber	Chambered tomb	Shirenewton	51.6667°N 2.8°W, ST447967	A portal dolmen with eleven conglomerate stones, some standing and some upright, supporting a large capstone.	Monmouthshire	Neolithic	MM013
	Harold's Stones	Stone alignment	Trellech United	51.7427°N 2.7266°W, SO499051	Three large monoliths, made of puddingstone, aligned from northeast by east to southwest by west. Local legends say that the stones were thrown by Jack o' Kent from the summit of the Skirrid, over twelve miles away.	Monmouthshire	Bronze Age	MM017
	Crick Round Barrow	Round barrow	Caerwent	51.6088°N 2.7459°W, ST484902	A round barrow (41 m in diameter and 1.5 m high). Excavations in 1939 and 1979 found Bronze Age flint tools, funerary remains, and a stone kerb ring 29 m in diameter. Some of the cup stones may have been used for astronomical observations.	Monmouthshire	Bronze Age	MM151
	Foresters' Oaks round barrow	Round barrow	Caerwent	51.6428°N 2.8254°W, ST429941	A Bronze Age barrow approximately 16 m in diameter and 1 m high.	Monmouthshire	Bronze Age?	MM333
	Five Lanes Round Barrow	Round barrow	Caerwent	51.6144°N 2.7946°W, ST450909	One of a pair of Bronze Age barrows (the other is not scheduled). The barrow is 35 m in diameter but was probably smaller (25 m).	Monmouthshire	Bronze Age	MM179
	Cwm Bwchel Round Cairn	Round cairn	Llanvihangel Crucorney	51.9388°N 3.0548°W, SO275272		Monmouthshire	Prehistoric	MM343
	Garreg Las Round Cairns	Round cairn	Llanvihangel Crucorney	51.9249°N 3.0063°W, SO309256		Monmouthshire	Prehistoric	MM302
	Graig Ddu Round Cairn	Round cairn	Llanvihangel Crucorney	51.9387°N 3.0548°W, SO284264		Monmouthshire	Prehistoric	MM342
	Hatterrall Hill Enclosure	Enclosure	Llanvihangel Crucorney	51.9241°N 3.0083°W, SO308255		Monmouthshire	Prehistoric	MM261
A flat grassy mountain top with a piles of stones to the right and a small boundary stone or marker to the right	Loxidge Tump cairn	Round cairn	Llanvihangel Crucorney	51.9569°N 3.0363°W, SO288292		Monmouthshire	Prehistoric	MM304
	Rhiw Arw cairn	Round cairn	Llanvihangel Crucorney	51.9383°N 3.0089°W, SO307271		Monmouthshire	Prehistoric	MM299
	Three Wells Round Cairn	Round cairn	Llanvihangel Crucorney	51.908°N 2.9964°W, SH315237		Monmouthshire	Prehistoric	MM303
	Chepstow Park Wood Cairn	Round cairn	Devauden	51.6744°N 2.7376°W, ST490975		Monmouthshire	Prehistoric	MM286
A mound of stones on a grassy summit, next to a concrete trigonometry point	Carn Blorenge	Round cairn	Llanfoist Fawr	51.8006°N 3.0602°W, SO269118		Monmouthshire	Bronze Age	MM219
A mound of rough gritstone on a summit of stone and heather	Carn-y-Defaid Round Cairns	Round cairn	Llanfoist Fawr, (also Blaenavon), (see also Torfaen)	51.7842°N 3.0585°W, SO270100		Monmouthshire	Prehistoric	MM209
A grassy mound with trees and farmland in the background	Middle Hendre Round Barrow	Round barrow	Llangattock-Vibon-Avel	51.82°N 2.7936°W, SO453137		Monmouthshire	Prehistoric	MM112
	Round Barrow 180 m North of Ty-Canol	Round barrow	Llanover	51.767°N 2.9417°W, SO351080		Monmouthshire	Prehistoric	MM081
	Wentwood Lodge Round Barrows	Round barrow	Shirenewton	51.6467°N 2.8446°W, ST416945	Two round barrows 180 m north-west of Wentwood Lodge.	Monmouthshire	Prehistoric	MM167
	Lower Hale Wood Round Barrows	Round cairn	Tintern	51.7055°N 2.6951°W, SO520009	Three Round Barrows in Lower Hale Wood.	Monmouthshire	Prehistoric	MM191
	Gwehelog Camp	Enclosure	Gwehelog Fawr	51.7177°N 2.8743°W, SO397024	Also known as Gwernydd camp. 650 m South of Ty Freeman.	Monmouthshire	Prehistoric	MM178
	Defended Enclosure 350 m NNW of Ty-Uchaf	Enclosure - Defensive	Llanelly	51.8309°N 3.1262°W, SO224153		Brecknockshire	Prehistoric	BR405
	Buckholt Wood Hilltop Enclosure	Enclosure	Monmouth	51.8397°N 2.7241°W, SO502159		Monmouthshire	Prehistoric	MM258
	Sudbrook Camp and Sudbrook Chapel	Enclosure	Portskewett	51.5826°N 2.7154°W, ST505873		Monmouthshire	Prehistoric	MM048
	Bishop Barnet's Wood Camp	Enclosure	Mathern	51.6445°N 2.6957°W, ST519941		Monmouthshire	Prehistoric	MM139
A steep grassy bank to the right, with bare trees to the left	Llanmelin Wood Hill Fort	Hill fort	Shirenewton	51.6291°N 2.7794°W, ST461925	A roughly oval hilltop fort (140 m by 100 m), with an area of about 6.56 hectares. Originally univallate, but expansion in the 2nd century BC added further banks. Archaeological investigations have indicated occupation during Roman times and in the 12th and 13th centuries.	Monmouthshire	Iron Age	MM024
	The Larches Camp	Hill fort	Caerwent	51.6058°N 2.8202°W, ST432899	A roughly D-shaped hill top fort (140 m by 100 m), with an area of about 1.24 hectares. The north is protected by a steep slope, with a bank and ditch around the rest of the site.	Monmouthshire	Iron Age	MM069
	Bulwarks Camp	Hill fort	Chepstow	51.6312°N 2.6689°W, ST538927	A small defensive hill fort, on top of cliffs overlooking the River Wye, the Beachley peninsula and the Severn estuary. It was probably built around the first century BC or the first century AD.	Monmouthshire	Iron Age	MM093
	Pen-Twyn Earthwork	Hill fort	Llanvihangel Crucorney	51.9011°N 2.9874°W, SO321229	A roughly rectangular hill top fort (140 m by 70 m), with an area of about 4.17 hectares. The fort is at the south end of Hatterall Hill with the ground sloping away to the east, south and west. The site is divided by a West-East bank and ditch. This may indicate the northern part is the oldest and extended later to include the southern part. Offa's Dyke Path passes through the site.	Monmouthshire	Iron Age	MM064
An aerial view of a mountain top showing an large oval ditch and wall split horizontally into three areas by two ditches and walls	Twyn-y-Gaer Camp	Hill fort	Llanvihangel Crucorney	51.8916°N 3.0273°W, SO294219	An elongated oval summit hill fort (roughly 225 m by 85 m), with an area of about 2.97 hectares. The fort occupies the top of Gaer hill and is split into three enclosures. Excavations in the 1960s and 1970s discovered jewellery, tools, ovens, signs of metal working, and traces of timber housing.	Monmouthshire	Iron Age	MM148
A grassy hill topped by an autumnal wood of various trees.	Llancayo Camp	Hill fort	Gwehelog Fawr	51.7294°N 2.902°W, SO378038	An oval univallate hill fort, of roughly 2.00 hectares at the northern edge of a ridge. The fort includes a complex entrance, possibly a causeway, at the south-east of the site.	Monmouthshire	Iron Age	MM078
Ramparts of Iron Age hill fort covered in bluebells	Coed y Bwnydd Camp	Hill fort	Llanarth	51.7565°N 2.9203°W, SO365068	A large multivallate fort at the southern tip of Clytha Hill. The oval fort measures about 170 m by 114 m with an area of 6.39 hectares.	Monmouthshire	Iron Age	MM075
	Gaer Fawr hill fort	Hill fort	Llangwm	51.6853°N 2.8096°W, ST441988	A roughly oval multivallate hill fort on a spur with an area of 3.50 hectares. The hill fort is surrounded by steep slopes to the west, north, and east. The site is broken up by lanes and field boundaries.	Monmouthshire	Iron Age	MM062
	Great House Camp	Hill fort	Llangwm	51.7261°N 2.8231°W, SO432033	A roughly circular multivallate hill fort sited on a natural terrace. The internal dimensions are 140 m by 150 m with an area of 2.37 hectares.	Monmouthshire	Iron Age?	MM105
Hilly grazing farmland with trees and hedgerows with Cae Camp in the distance on the skyline	Cae Camp	Hill fort	Llanhennock	51.6398°N 2.9278°W, ST358938	An oval bivallate fort situated on a ridge, roughly 92 m by 86 m with an area of 1.59 hectares. The sites contains a disused quarry from much later times.	Monmouthshire	Iron Age	MM079
	Candwr Camp	Hill fort	Llanhennock	51.6357°N 2.9698°W, ST329934	Also known as Caerau Hill fort. The univallate fort is roughly circular (100 m by 75 m), sited on a natural prominence, with an area of 0.70 hectares.	Monmouthshire	Iron Age	MM135
	Wilcrick Hill Camp	Hill fort	Magor with Undy, (also Bishton), (see also Newport)	51.5859°N 2.8512°W, ST411877	A large, roughly oval (194 m by 134 m) multivallate hill fort with an area of 1.0 hectares. The fort is surrounded on all sides by steep slopes.	Monmouthshire	Iron Age	MM127
	Gaer Hill Camp, Penterry	Hill fort	St Arvans	51.6779°N 2.7002°W, ST516979	A hilltop fort with commanding views. The fort includes roughly rectangular inner area (46 m x 68 m), inside a larger, roughly circular enclosure (240 m x 254 m).	Monmouthshire	Iron Age	MM025
	Pierce Wood Camps	Hill fort	St Arvans	51.6604°N 2.6721°W, ST536959	Two hill forts on a steeply sided promontory of the River Wye, to the east of Piercefield House. The smaller (westerly) univallate fort is roughly rectangular (98 m x 82 m), with an area of 0.20 hectares. The Wye Valley Walk passes through the site. The larger (easterly) univallate fort is also roughly rectangular (388 m x 110 m).	Monmouthshire	Iron Age	MM020
A grassy ditch and bank shaded by mostly small trees	Blackcliff Wood Camp	Hill fort	Tintern	51.6878°N 2.6827°W, ST529990	A roughly oval fort (72 m x 46 m) with an area of 0.46 hectares. The Wye Valley Walk passes through the site. Also known as Porthcaseg Fort.	Monmouthshire	Iron Age	MM027
	Gaer hill fort, Trellech	Hill fort	Trellech United	51.7303°N 2.7356°W, SO492037	A roughly circular (diameter 33 m) bivallate fort with an area of 3.50 hectares.	Monmouthshire	Iron Age	MM077
	Abergavenny Roman Fort	Fort	Abergavenny	51.8204°N 3.019°W, SO298140		Monmouthshire	Roman	MM193
Caerwent Roman basillica and Forum remains	Caerwent Roman Town (Venta Silurum)	House (domestic)	Caerwent	51.6126°N 2.7683°W, ST469907	Extensively excavated Roman town. Much of the excavated remains are now open to the public.	Monmouthshire	Roman	MM001
	Church Farm Romano-British settlement	Enclosure	Caldicot	51.5993°N 2.7496°W, ST481892		Monmouthshire	Late Iron Age/Roman	MM334
	Stoop Hill Cropmark Enclosure	Enclosure	Caldicot	51.5828°N 2.7472°W, ST483873	Enclosure revealed by Aerial Photography.	Monmouthshire	Roman	MM169
	Portskewett Hill Roman Site	Unclassified site	Portskewett	51.5946°N 2.7264°W, ST497886		Monmouthshire	Roman	MM019
	Usk Roman Site	Fort	Usk	51.7014°N 2.8995°W, SO379006	The Roman legionary fortress of Burrium was founded on the site of Usk by the military commander Aulus Didius Gallus, around AD 55	Monmouthshire	Roman	MM155
	Five Lanes Roman Site	Villa	Caerwent	51.6153°N 2.8011°W, ST446910	Remains of a Roman villa comprising a winged corridor with five rooms and other structures. Near to the Roman town at Caerwent.	Monmouthshire	Roman	MM350
	Whitewall Brake Roman Site	Villa	Caerwent	51.6168°N 2.7592°W, ST475911	Rectilinear complex of building ranges and courts, where a Roman mosaic, along with characteristic Roman building debris was discovered	Monmouthshire	Roman	MM152
	Little Hadnock Roman Villa, Dixton Newtown	Villa	Monmouth	51.8338°N 2.6758°W, SO535152	Group of stone buildings, one with hypocaust. Finds indicate occupation in the 2nd-3rd century AD.	Monmouthshire	Roman	MM195
	Wyndcliff Roman Site	Villa	St Arvans	51.6751°N 2.6844°W, ST527975		Monmouthshire	Roman	MM351
	Hatterrall Hill Cross Ridge Dyke	Linear earthwork	Llanvihangel Crucorney	51.9202°N 3.0144°W, SO303251		Monmouthshire	Early Medieval	MM260
In the distance, A barren mountain ridge top viewed from the east. The ridge falls away to the north.	Skirrid Fawr hill fort	Hill fort	Llantilio Pertholey	51.8579°N 2.9731°W, SO330181	An elongated roughly oval multivallate hill fort at the northern end of a mountain ridge. The area of the hill fort includes the foundations of St Michael's Chapel.	Monmouthshire	Iron Age	MM182
The southern end of the foundations of a small rectangular chapel on a mountain ridge. The entrance to the chapel is marked by two stones. Beound the stones the ridge falls away gently. In the distance is a green flat valley.	St Michaels Chapel (remains)	Chapel	Llantilio Pertholey	51.8579°N 2.9731°W, SO330181	The foundations of a medieval chapel (4 m north-south by 7.5 m east-west) at the northern end of a mountain ridge. The chapel lies within the area of the Skirrid Fawr hill fort.	Monmouthshire	Early Medieval	MM182
A cross shaft and cross head carved from a single block	Croes Lwyd Farm Cross	Cross	Raglan	51.7584°N 2.8699°W, SO400069	An octagonal cross shaft and head carved from a single block. Marked on a 14th-century map.	Monmouthshire	Early Medieval	MM156
St Arvans church	St Arvan's Church Cross-slab	Cross-marked stone	St Arvans	51.6653°N 2.7004°W, ST516965		Monmouthshire	Early Medieval	MM355
Abergavenny Bridge over the Usk at Dolau Meadow	Abergavenny Bridge	Bridge	Abergavenny	51.8195°N 3.0292°W, SO291139	(also known as Tudor Bridge)	Monmouthshire	15th & 19th Century	MM010
Abergavenny Castle walls	Abergavenny Castle	Castle	Abergavenny	51.8197°N 3.0174°W, SO299139	Fortified site since prehistoric times. 11th century Norman motte, with major building during 13th and 14th centuries. The keep was rebuilt in the 19th century and now houses a museum.	Monmouthshire	Medieval	MM056
St Mary's Priory	St Mary's Priory	Priory	Abergavenny	51.8213°N 3.0157°W, SO300141	Area of Conventual Buildings.	Monmouthshire	Medieval	MM183
Crick Manor	Crick Medieval House	House (domestic)	Caerwent	51.6089°N 2.7376°W, ST490902		Monmouthshire	Medieval	MM053
	Crick Moated Site	Moated Site	Caerwent	51.6095°N 2.7378°W, ST490903		Monmouthshire	Medieval	MM051
Remains of a stone wall, covered by vegetation, in woodland	Dinham Castle	Castle	Caerwent	51.6274°N 2.7522°W, ST480923	Slight and overgrown remains of a small castle. One of six castles around Wentwood Forest. (Note: The six castles are Cas Troggy, Dinham, Llanvaches, Llanvair, Pencoed, and Penhow.)	Monmouthshire	Medieval	MM153
Masonry remains of corner of caste, surrounded by trees, on a bank overlooking a churchyard	Llanvair Castle	Castle	Caerwent	51.6278°N 2.802°W, ST445924	Remains of a small courtyard castle. One of six castles around Wentwood Forest.	Monmouthshire	Medieval	MM047
St Brides	St. Brides Netherwent Deserted Village	Deserted Medieval Village	Caerwent	51.6017°N 2.8276°W, ST427895	By tradition founded by Brochwael, the son of Meurig of Gwent, in the 10th century	Monmouthshire	Medieval	MM154
Caldicot Castle walls	Caldicot Castle (unoccupied parts)	Castle	Caldicot	51.5932°N 2.7432°W, ST486885	An extensive stone medieval castle (probably built on the site of an older earthwork castle) dated from the 13th and 14th century with some changes in the 15th century, and substantially restored and rebuilt in the 19th century.	Monmouthshire	Medieval	MM050
	The Berries Mound & Bailey Castle	Motte & Bailey	Caldicot	51.6022°N 2.7415°W, ST487895	Also known as Ballan Moor and Mount Ballan. A small motte with a large D-shaped bailey, in a low-lying, marshy area. Probably built by the Ballon family in the late 11th century or early 12th century.	Monmouthshire	Medieval	MM026
Chepstow Castle curtain wall	Chepstow Castle	Castle	Chepstow	51.6437°N 2.6755°W, ST533940	The castle is the most southerly of the Welsh Marches castles, overlooking the River Wye. Constructed in the late 11th century with 12th- and 13th-century additions.	Monmouthshire	Medieval	MM003
Chepstow Port Wall	Chepstow Port Wall	Town defences	Chepstow	51.6404°N 2.6762°W, ST533937		Monmouthshire	Medieval	MM002
Churchyard cross at St Martin	St Martin's Cwmyoy, Churchyard Cross	Cross	Llanvihangel Crucorney	51.9042°N 3.0202°W, SO299233		Monmouthshire	Medieval	MM142
Llanthony Abbey	Llanthony Priory	Priory	Llanvihangel Crucorney	51.9448°N 3.0364°W, SO289278		Monmouthshire	Medieval	MM004
	Pen-y-Clawdd Castle Mound	Motte	Llanvihangel Crucorney	51.8752°N 3.0037°W, SO310201	A low circular ditched mound.	Monmouthshire	Medieval	MM145
	Penbidwal Moated Site	Moated Site	Llanvihangel Crucorney	51.8942°N 2.9582°W, SO341221		Monmouthshire	Medieval	MM210
A recently mown field with a conical mound to the left which is surrounded by trees. In the distance is the Skirrid mountain.	Tre Fedw, Moat Mound and Bailey Castle	Motte & Bailey	Llanvihangel Crucorney	51.8905°N 2.9743°W, SO330217		Monmouthshire	Medieval	MM063
	Chepstow Park Wood Moated Site	Moated Site	Devauden	51.6783°N 2.7388°W, ST490979		Monmouthshire	Medieval	MM103
	Cwrt y Gaer Ringwork	Ringwork	Devauden	51.6949°N 2.799°W, ST448998		Monmouthshire	Medieval	MM067
A tail, plain, short-armed cross on a plain base in a graveyard overlooking a trees and a green valley	Holy Cross Kilgwrrwg, Churchyard Cross	Cross	Devauden	51.6822°N 2.7792°W, ST462984		Monmouthshire	Medieval	MM104
A stone cross on a chamfered column, on four stone square steps, with trees in the background	St Thomas a Becket's Wolvesnewton, Churchyard Cross	Cross	Devauden	51.6939°N 2.7909°W, ST454997		Monmouthshire	Medieval	MM330
	Goytre Wood Castle Mound	Motte	Grosmont	51.9045°N 2.9415°W, SO353233	Also known as Gwern Castle. A small damaged motte, 20 m in diameter and 4 m high. Remnants of a rectangular stone building on summit.	Monmouthshire	Medieval	MM138
Gated entrance to Grosmont Castle	Grosmont Castle	Castle	Grosmont	51.9154°N 2.8657°W, SO405244	The present ruins date from three building phases in the 11th and 12th centuries. One of 'The Three Castles' (Note: The Three Castles in the Monnow valley (Grosmont, Skenfrith and White castles) were brought together under a single lordship by King Stephen in 1138. The castles share many features of design and construction, and the existing remains all date from the 11th century, when under the control of Hubert de Burgh, with some later building. All three castles remained in common ownership until 1902, and are all now in state care, under the guardianship of Cadw. The castles are linked by the Three Castles Walk.) in the Monnow valley.	Monmouthshire	Medieval	MM007
	St Nicholas' Grosmont, Churchyard Cross	Cross	Grosmont	51.9143°N 2.8669°W, SO404243		Monmouthshire	Medieval	MM147
A square platform of three stone steps covered in lichen, with a carved stone block on top	St Cadoc's Llangattock Lingoed, Churchyard Cross	Cross	Grosmont	51.8754°N 2.9287°W, SO361200		Monmouthshire	Medieval	MM319
St James, Llanvetherine	St James's Llanvetherine, Churchyard Cross	Cross	Grosmont	51.8497°N 2.9244°W, SO364171		Monmouthshire	Medieval	MM317
A plain greystone cross, in a mounting block, on top of four stone steps, with a small stone church in the background	St David's Trostry, Churchyard Cross]]	Cross	Gwehelog Fawr	51.7347°N 2.9285°W, SO359044		Monmouthshire	Medieval	MM321
A stone cross mounted on three steps, also of stone, in a grassy churchyard. In the background is stone church and a large tree.	St Aeddan's Bettws Newydd, Churchyard Cross	Cross	Llanarth	51.7478°N 2.9251°W, SO362058		Monmouthshire	Medieval	MM122
St Teilo's Church	St Teilo's Churchyard Cross	Cross	Llanarth	51.7937°N 2.9066°W, SO375109		Monmouthshire	Medieval	MM116
The base of a cross with four stone steps, in the shade of a yew tree, with the stone church in the background	St Mabli's Llanvapley, Churchyard Cross	Cross	Llanarth	51.8217°N 2.9201°W, SO366140		Monmouthshire	Medieval	MM318
St Peter's Churchyard Cross	St Peter's Churchyard Cross	Cross	Bryngwyn,	51.7792°N 2.8847°W, SO390093		Monmouthshire	Medieval	MM323
	Twyn y Cregen Castle Mound	Motte	Llanarth	51.782°N 2.9252°W, SO362096	A 5 m high mound 20 m in diameter, and no traces of a ditch.	Monmouthshire	Medieval	MM080
	Wern-y-Cwrt Castle Mound	Motte	Llanarth	51.7746°N 2.8797°W, SO394088	A steep-sided mound (26 m in diameter and 4.5 m high) with traces of a surrounding ditch.	Monmouthshire	Medieval	MM099
	Graig Foel medieval ringwork	Ringwork	Llanbadoc	51.7046°N 2.9136°W, SO369010		Monmouthshire	Medieval	MM335
	Battle Tump	Mound	Llanelly	51.8341°N 3.0941°W, SO247156		Brecknockshire	Medieval	BR010
	St Peter's Churchyard Cross	Cross	Llanwenarth,	51.8271°N 3.0524°W, SO275147		Monmouthshire	Medieval	MM118
A square base of three stone steps supporting a stone octagonal shaft, with a church to the right and wooded hills in the background	St Faith's Llanfoist, Churchyard Cross	Cross	Llanfoist Fawr	51.8129°N 3.0365°W, SO288132		Monmouthshire	Medieval	MM306
	Skenfrith Deserted Medieval Settlement	Deserted Medieval Village	Llangattock-Vibon-Avel	51.8785°N 2.7942°W, SO454202		Monmouthshire	Medieval	MM215
	Newcastle Castle	Motte & Bailey	Llangattock-Vibon-Avel	51.8513°N 2.8038°W, SO447172		Monmouthshire	Medieval	MM085
A green field with trees and a small hill in the background	Grace Dieu Abbey	Abbey	Llangattock-Vibon-Avel	51.8142°N 2.7974°W, SO451131		Monmouthshire	Medieval	MM158
Skenfrith Castle	Skenfrith Castle	Castle	Llangattock-Vibon-Avel	51.8786°N 2.7904°W, SO456203	One of three castles brought under a single lordship in 1138, the present ruins date from the 12th century. One of 'The Three Castles' in the Monnow valley.	Monmouthshire	Medieval	MM088
	Llangwm Mound & Bailey Castle	Motte	Llangwm	51.694°N 2.8297°W, ST427997	A low oval (14 m-16 m) motte.	Monmouthshire	Medieval	MM061
	Rockfield Farm motte	Ringwork	Llangwm	51.7057°N 2.8345°W, SO424011	Ringwork north-east of New House.	Monmouthshire	Medieval	MM074
St Cybi's Well, Llangybi, Monmouthshire	Ffynnon Cybi (St Cybi's Well)	Well	Llangybi	51.6652°N 2.9058°W, ST374966		Monmouthshire	Medieval	MM074
Passageway out of castle with the remains of large masonry towers on each side	Llangibby Castle (Castell Tregrug)	Castle	Llangybi	51.6717°N 2.9211°W, ST364973	A roughly rectangular castle sited on the summit of a ridge. Probably built in the early 14th century. The castle is largely ruinous but parts of walls and towers remain. Replaced an earlier motte and bailey (Llangibby Castle Mound) 400 m to the east.	Monmouthshire	Medieval	MM109
A grassy field with a wooden gate, behind which is a grassy flat topped mound, with trees around it	Llangibby Castle Mound	Motte	Llangybi	51.6714°N 2.913°W, ST369973	Also known as Bowling Green. A large low flat-topped circular mound. The site was heavily landscaped in the 18th century. Generally supposed to pre-date the nearby Llangibby Castle, but may post-date the castle.	Monmouthshire	Medieval	MM110
	Castell Arnallt (Castle Arnold)	Motte	Llanover	51.7849°N 2.9873°W, SO319100	A fortified court house, or llys, of Seisyll ap Dyfnwal, lord of Over Gwent (Gwent Uwchcoed), before it was destroyed after Seisyll and some of his household were killed in 1175. Minor earthwork remains.	Monmouthshire	Medieval	MM086
A stone cross and steps next to a yew tree in a graveyard, with a field with sheep in the background	St Cadoc's Churchyard Cross	Cross	Llanover	51.7816°N 2.9722°W, SO330096	Parish is also known as Llangattock Juxta Usk.	Monmouthshire	Medieval	MM123
A square base of three stone steps supporting a mounting block and crucifix, also of stone, in the churchyard of a small church	St David's Churchyard Cross, Llanddewi Rhydderch	Cross	Llanover	51.8114°N 2.9444°W, SO349129		Monmouthshire	Medieval	MM117
The base of an old cross on a square base with three steps covered in lichen	St Michael's Llanvihangel Nigh Usk, Churchyard Cross	Cross	Llanover	51.7778°N 2.9491°W, SO346092	(also known as Llanfihangel Gobion)	Monmouthshire	Medieval	MM124
A flat topped grassy mound behind a barbed wire fence and hedgerow	St Mary's Yard Castle Mound	Motte	Llanover	51.7573°N 2.9434°W, SO349069	A low D-shaped mound near the village of Llanfair Kilgeddin.	Monmouthshire	Medieval	MM082
Part of the shaft of a stone cross and its mounting block on a square base of three steps	St Bartholomew's Churchyard Cross, Llanover	Cross	Llanover	51.7791°N 2.9901°W, SO317094		Monmouthshire	Medieval	MM307
A square stone base of three steps topped with a stone and part of the shaft of a now missing cross	St Bridget's Llansantffraed, Churchyard Cross	Cross	Llanover	51.7849°N 2.9331°W, SO357099		Monmouthshire	Medieval	MM312
A square stone base of four steps supporting a modern cross	St Mary's Llanfair Cilgedyn, Churchyard Cross	Cross	Llanover	51.7729°N 2.9351°W, SO355086		Monmouthshire	Medieval	MM326
Square grassed area surrounded by moat and some trees with a wooden bridge	Hen Gwrt Moated Site	Moated Site	Llantilio Crossenny	51.8315°N 2.8782°W, SO395151		Monmouthshire	Medieval	MM094
	Penrhos Mound & Bailey Castle	Motte & Bailey	Llantilio Crossenny	51.8146°N 2.8581°W, SO409132	A ditched motte, about 30 m in diameter and 6.0 m high, standing towards the south of an irregular oval enclosure defined by a ditch. It is possibly the castle mentioned as being demolished c.1252.	Monmouthshire	Medieval	MM097
White Castle, inner ward gatehouse and curtain wall	White Castle	Castle	Llantilio Crossenny	51.8461°N 2.9022°W, SO379167	Norman in origins, it was first known as Llantilio Castle, but called the White Castle (after its whitewashed walls) from the 13th century. One of 'The Three Castles' in the Monnow valley.	Monmouthshire	Medieval	MM006
	Coed-Cwnwr Moated Site	Moated Site	Llantrisant Fawr	51.6905°N 2.8511°W, ST412994	An earthwork comprising a ditch enclosing a roughly 30 m square area	Monmouthshire	Medieval	MM060
	Moated Site North West of Bertholey House (White Hall)	Moated Site	Llantrisant Fawr	51.6493°N 2.8839°W, ST389948		Monmouthshire	Medieval	MM040
	The Procurator's House	House (domestic)	Magor with Undy	51.579°N 2.8314°W, ST424870	Post Medieval building adjoining Magor Churchyard	Monmouthshire	Post Medieval	MM180
	Medieval Moated Site 400 m N of Undy Church	Moated Site	Magor with Undy	51.5823°N 2.81°W, ST439873	Courtfield is a domestic site comprising a central 'platform' measuring 60 m (NE-SW) by 45 m, embanked on the NE, surrounded by a ditch up to 1.2 m deep and an outer bank 0.5 m high; traces of bank and ditch projecting NW from the N corner are still visible.	Monmouthshire	Medieval	MM198
	Relict Seawall alongside Collister Pill Reen	Seawall	Magor with Undy	51.5759°N 2.801°W, ST445866	1.3 km stretch of embankment on the western side of Collister Pill Reen: thought to be an early feature in the landscape of the Caldicot levels	Monmouthshire	Medieval	MM226
St Mary's, Magor	St Mary's Magor, Churchyard Cross	Cross	Magor with Undy	51.5793°N 2.8306°W, ST425870		Monmouthshire	Medieval	MM314
St Mary's Church, Undy	St Mary's Churchyard Cross, Undy	Cross	Magor with Undy	51.5782°N 2.8096°W, ST439869		Monmouthshire	Medieval	MM126
	Moated Site South of Moynes Court	Moated Site	Mathern	51.6144°N 2.6948°W, ST519908		Monmouthshire	Medieval	MM187
Runston Chapel	Runston Chapel	Chapel	Mathern	51.6204°N 2.7293°W, ST496915	Runston Medieval Village Site & Runston Chapel	Monmouthshire	Medieval	MM095
Dingestow Castle mound	Dingestow Castle	Motte	Mitchel Troy	51.79°N 2.7902°W, SO455104	Two large roughly rectangular enclosures surrounded by ditches and the River Trothy. Constructed in 1184 but immediately raided. The shape and size are unusual for a motte and bailey in the region, and may have been the start of a masonry castle. Excavations in 1969 found no masonry remains. May have been abandoned, or built using wood pallisades, as the castle was noted in 1469. Possibly intended as a replacement for the nearby Mill Wood Castle Mound.	Monmouthshire	Medieval	MM113
A wooded hillside with river banks and car park in the foreground	Mill Wood Castle Mound	Motte	Mitchel Troy	51.7894°N 2.7846°W, SO459103	A ditched mound, roughly 32 m in diameter and 5 m high, with an enclosed bailey to the north. An early example of a motte and bailey.	Monmouthshire	Medieval	MM114
	St Michaels Mitchel Troy, Churchyard Cross	Cross	Mitchel Troy	51.7898°N 2.7375°W, SO492103	14th-century churchyard cross, 3.3 metres (11 ft) high, square sectioned with alternate ball flower and shield decorations, on a stepped base.	Monmouthshire	Medieval	MM111
	Moated Site at Coed-y-Fedw	Moated Site	Mitchel Troy	51.7751°N 2.8044°W, SO446088		Monmouthshire	Medieval	MM213
A square base of five steps made from large stones, supporting a base and a modern cross in front of a low stone church and tower	St Catwg's Cwmcarfan, Churchyard Cross	Cross	Mitchel Troy	51.7636°N 2.7587°W, SO477074		Monmouthshire	Medieval	MM328
St Dingad's Church Churchyard Cross	St Dingad's Churchyard Cross, Dingestow	Cross	Mitchel Troy	51.7895°N 2.7884°W, SO457103		Monmouthshire	Medieval	MM316
A square base of three stone steps supporting a stone block and simple cross, surrounded by gravestones and tombs	St Mary's Church, Churchyard Cross, Tregare	Cross	Mitchel Troy	51.7878°N 2.8455°W, SO417102		Monmouthshire	Medieval	MM320
	Clawdd Du	Town defences	Monmouth	51.8064°N 2.7219°W, SO503122	A mediaeval linear defensive earthwork or moat, constructed as protection for the faubourg of Overmonnow, on the opposite side of the River Monnow from the town and castle of Monmouth.	Monmouthshire	Medieval	MM036
A low earth mound with ditch shrouded in mist	Dixton Mound	Motte	Monmouth	51.82°N 2.7008°W, SO517137	A low earth mound (30 m by 40 m and 2 m high) surrounded by a ditch. Excavations found pottery indicating occupation in Roman times and the 11th and 12th centuries. No evidence of a motte or bailey. Possibly a moated site.	Monmouthshire	Medieval	MM125
Great Tower, Monmouth Castle	Monmouth Castle	Castle	Monmouth	51.8125°N 2.7167°W, SO506128	Built on the site of an early Norman border castle, the only parts now visible are parts of the Great Tower (11th - 12th century), Hall (13th century), and parts of walls.	Monmouthshire	Medieval	MM159
	Monnow Bridge	Bridge	Monmouth	51.809°N 2.72°W, SO504125	Medieval bridge over the River Monnow	Monmouthshire	Medieval	MM008
	St Peter's Dixton, Churchyard Cross	Cross	Monmouth	51.8186°N 2.6985°W, SO519135		Monmouthshire	Medieval	MM308
	Harold's House (site of)	House (domestic)	Portskewett	51.5891°N 2.7253°W, ST498880	An excavation was carried out for the TV programme Time Team, broadcast on 30 March 2008. The excavation revealed that a Norman fortified tower house had existed on the site, probably contemporaneous with the nearby church, and reached by a creek off the Severn	Monmouthshire	Medieval	MM029
Base of a cross with four stone steps and a socket stone above, in a churchyard	St Mary's Portskewett, Churchyard Cross	Cross	Portskewett	51.5899°N 2.7245°W, ST499881		Monmouthshire	Medieval	MM315
Raglan Castle's main entrance	Raglan Castle	Castle	Raglan	51.7702°N 2.8498°W, SO417085	An impressive late medieval (13th - 15th century) stone castle.	Monmouthshire	Medieval	MM005
A square platform of three stone steps supporting a carved cross base with a modern octagonal shaft, in the shade of a yew tree	St Cadoc's Raglan, Churchyard Cross	Cross	Raglan	51.7646°N 2.8514°W, SO414077		Monmouthshire	Medieval	MM100
A square base of four stone steps supporting a shaft topped with a carved figure	St Govan's Llangovan, Churchyard Cross	Cross	Raglan	51.7453°N 2.7882°W, SO456054		Monmouthshire	Medieval	MM327
A square base of three stone steps topped with a tapering shaft and ornate carved cross	St John's Llandenny, Churchyard Cross	Cross	Raglan	51.7309°N 2.8482°W, SO415039		Monmouthshire	Medieval	MM322
St Martin's Churchyard Cross	St Martin's Churchyard Cross, Pen-y-Clawdd	Cross	Raglan	51.7667°N 2.7943°W, SO452078		Monmouthshire	Medieval	MM329
A nursery with a woodend sheds with a breeze block wall, behind which is an earthern mound covered with trees	Trecastle Motte and Bailey	Motte and Bailey	Raglan	51.7594°N 2.7957°W, SO451070	An oval motte with bailey to the south surrounded by a moat.	Monmouthshire	Medieval	MM098
A square stone three step cross base, supporting a socket stone, in front of a small stone church and tower	St Michael's Llanfihangel Rogiet, Churchyard Cross	Cross	Rogiet	51.5869°N 2.7934°W, ST451878		Monmouthshire	Medieval	MM325
	Cas Troggy Castle	Castle	Shirenewton	51.6526°N 2.8469°W, ST415952	Small ruined fortified hunting lodge or manor house built by Roger Bigod around 1303. One of six castles around Wentwood Forest.	Monmouthshire	Medieval	MM015
A very weathered square stone block with a short shaft leaning to the right	St Mary's Penterry, Churchyard Cross	Cross	Tintern	51.6854°N 2.6962°W, ST519987		Monmouthshire	Medieval	MM331
Tintern Abbey South	Tintern Abbey Inner Precinct	Abbey	Tintern	51.6969°N 2.6768°W, SO533000		Monmouthshire	Medieval	MM102
	Tintern Abbey, Precinct Wall	Wall	Tintern	51.6971°N 2.6802°W, SO530000		Monmouthshire	Medieval	MM157
	Tintern Abbey, Watergate	Gatehouse	Tintern	51.6981°N 2.678°W, SO532001		Monmouthshire	Medieval	MM265
Medieval building platforms west of Trellech Church	Medieval House Sites W of Trellech Church	Shrunken Medieval Village	Trellech United	51.746°N 2.7261°W, SO499055		Monmouthshire	Medieval	MM194
St Mary's Penallt Churchyard Cross	St Mary's Penallt, Churchyard Cross	Cross	Trellech United	51.7931°N 2.6944°W, SO522107		Monmouthshire	Medieval	MM146
The Virtuous Well, Trellech	The Virtuous Well	Holy Well	Trellech United	51.7424°N 2.7212°W, SO503051		Monmouthshire	Medieval	MM171
Stone preaching cross in St. Nicholas Churchyard.	St Nicholas' Trellech, Churchyard Cross	Cross	Trellech United	51.7456°N 2.7249°W, SO500054	Five-stepped pedestal, large socketstone, with two sections of shaft and a modern cross-head, in St Nicholas' Churchyard, Trellech.	Monmouthshire	Medieval	MM107
Two stone steps on a roadside grassy bank	Trellech Cross Preaching Cross	Cross	Trellech United	51.733°N 2.7263°W, SO499040	Wayside cross. Two stone steps on a roadside grassy bank.	Monmouthshire	Medieval	MM108
Archaeological dig further south than the scheduled area.	Trellech Shrunken Medieval Village	Shrunken Medieval Village	Trellech United	51.7422°N 2.723°W, SO501050	From 1250 to its decline around 1600, Trellech was a booming iron-melting centre. The scheduled area is close to the present village centre but an ongoing archaeological dig further south has found many building foundations.	Monmouthshire	Medieval	MM272
Tump Terrett Castle Mound, Trellech	Tump Terrett Castle Mound	Motte	Trellech United	51.7447°N 2.7257°W, SO499053	A steep-sided ditched mound (36 m in diameter and 5.5 m high). Mentioned in 1231 and later referred to as "site of" in 1306. Recent excavations and investigation suggest a Motte and Bailey castle, built early in the period of the Norman conquest of the area.	Monmouthshire	Medieval	MM016
Garrison Tower, Usk Castle	Usk Castle (Unoccupied parts)	Castle	Usk	51.7052°N 2.9033°W, SO376011	A substantial masonry castle dating from around 1138 and now generally ruinous.	Monmouthshire	Medieval	MM012
	Usk Priory Gatehouse	Gatehouse	Usk	51.7024°N 2.9009°W, SO378007	A surviving fragment of a Benedictine priory founded around 1135 and dissolved in 1536	Monmouthshire	Medieval	MM090
Chepstow Town Slipway	Chepstow Town Slipway	Quay	Chepstow	51.6445°N 2.6686°W, ST538941	A well preserved post-medieval slip compromising of a cambered cobbled slipway some 25 m long by 2.6 m wide, sloping at an angle of 10 degrees. The final 5.0 m of the slipway forms a flight of shallow steps down to the low-tide mark in the River Wye	Monmouthshire	Post Medieval	MM301
A stone circular building with a conical roof and lantern cap at the top	Hygga Farm Dovecote	Dovecote	Trellech United	51.7292°N 2.7462°W, SO485036	A circular stone dovecote with mullion windows and a conical roof.	Monmouthshire	Post Medieval	MM150
A hillside covered in bracken and scrub with a grassy path going up the hill, first to the left then to the right	Disgwylfa Tramroads	Tramroad	Llanelly, (also Llangattock), (see also Powys)	51.8189°N 3.1371°W, SO217139		Brecknockshire	Post Medieval	MM340
Tintern lower wireworks	Lower or Abbey Wireworks, Tintern	Iron forge	Tintern	51.6977°N 2.6864°W, SO526001	Early industrial site, manufacturing wire from the 16th to the 19th centuries. It was part of an integrated iron production system, sited along the Angidy Valley. The manufacture of wire was the final stage in the process, closest to the River Wye, at the foot of the valley.	Monmouthshire	Post Medieval	MM266
	Tintern Upper Wireworks (New Tongs Mill)	Leat	Tintern	51.6997°N 2.7123°W, SO508003		Monmouthshire	Post Medieval	MM268
	Whitebrook Wireworks Leat	Leat	Trellech United	51.7567°N 2.6833°W, SO529066		Monmouthshire	Post Medieval	MM292
	Cewere Quarry and Limekiln, Llanvair-Discoed	Quarry	Caerwent	51.629°N 2.7874°W, ST455925	A well-preserved limekiln and quarry with associated earthworks. The kiln is of a Wye Valley type, roughly 4 m high and 6.5 m long, built into the bank to the south of the quarry.	Monmouthshire	19th Century	MM289
	Limekiln and Quarries at Craig-yr-Hafod	Limekiln	Llanfoist Fawr	51.7871°N 3.0558°W, SO272103		Monmouthshire	Post Medieval	MM278
	Pwll Du Limestone Quarry & Water Balance Lift	Industrial monument	Llanfoist Fawr	51.7974°N 3.0866°W, SO251115		Monmouthshire	Post Medieval	MM225
	Colwell Grove Limekiln and Quarry, Tintern	Limekiln	Tintern	51.6945°N 2.6768°W, ST533997		Monmouthshire	Post Medieval	MM290
A large six sided chimney made from cut brown stone, surrounded by woodland.	Clearwater Paper Mill	Mill	Trellech United	51.7575°N 2.6804°W, SO531067		Monmouthshire	Post Medieval	MM294
	Whitebrook Wireworks	Iron forge	Trellech United	51.7545°N 2.6805°W, SO531064		Monmouthshire	Post Medieval	MM270
	Tramway Embankment of Grosmont Railway	Tramway embankment	Llanvihangel Crucorney	51.885°N 2.9704°W, SO333211		Monmouthshire	Post Medieval	MM199
	Blorenge Quarries Tramroad	Tramroad	Llanfoist Fawr	51.8006°N 3.0703°W, SO262118		Monmouthshire	Post Medieval	MM288
	Blorenge Tunnel, Hill's Tramroad	Tramroad	Llanfoist Fawr	51.8098°N 3.0583°W, SO271128	Tunnel, length approximately 40 m, carrying Hill's Tramroad. On the north slope of the Blorenge.	Monmouthshire	Post Medieval	MM275
Path sloping up hill through trees. The path includes stone blocks that once supported iron rails.	Hill's Tramroad Inclines, Llanfoist	Tramroad	Llanfoist Fawr	51.8085°N 3.0478°W, SO278127		Monmouthshire	19th Century	MM276
	Pen-ffordd-goch Iron and coal patching, Blaenavon	Industrial monument	Llanfoist Fawr, (also Blaenavon), (see also Torfaen)	51.7882°N 3.0773°W, SO257104	Pen-ffordd-goch is also known as The Keepers. The site is connected with the Hanbury estate from the 17th century and Blaenavon Ironworks from about 1788. The remains of scouring and adit mining include leats, ponds, dams, scours, levels, tips, shaft mounds, tracks and tramroads.	Monmouthshire	17th Century	MM227
	Carreg Maen Taro Ironstone Quarries	Quarry	Llanfoist Fawr, (also Blaenavon), (also Llanelly), (see also Torfaen)	51.794°N 3.1056°W, SO238111		Monmouthshire	Post Medieval	MM295
	Pwll Du Tramroad Tunnel Northern Entrances & Site of Lower Bank	Industrial monument	Llanfoist Fawr	51.7987°N 3.0957°W, SO245116	Tunnel ran from near Blaenafon Iron works to link with the tramroad to the Brecon and Newport Canal at Llanfoist	Monmouthshire	19th Century	MM224
	Tramroad Bridge, Bailey's Tramroad, Govilon	Bridge	Llanfoist Fawr	51.8138°N 3.0754°W, SO259133	Also known as Cwm Llanwenarth bridge	Monmouthshire	19th Century	MM204
	Perth-hir House (Remains of)	House (domestic)	Llangattock-Vibon-Avel	51.8396°N 2.7463°W, SO486159		Monmouthshire	Post Medieval	MM144
	Blackcliff Wood Limekiln	Limekiln	Tintern	51.6803°N 2.6769°W, ST532981		Monmouthshire	Post Medieval	MM291
Angidy Old Blast Furnace	Abbey Tintern Furnace	Industrial monument	Tintern	51.6992°N 2.705°W, SO513002	Angidy Ironworks. Also known as 'The Old Blast Furnace', it smelted Iron from the 1590s to the 1820s. It was a key part of the industrial metalworking of the Angidy Valley, producing iron for the wireworks further down the valley.	Monmouthshire	Post Medieval	MM197
	Coed-Ithel Iron Furnace	Kiln	Trellech United	51.7199°N 2.6847°W, SO527025	Early iron furnace.	Monmouthshire	Post Medieval	MM164
	Woolpitch Wood Iron Furnace	Kiln	Trellech United	51.7402°N 2.7392°W, SO490048	Early iron furnace.	Monmouthshire	Post Medieval	MM177
	Clydach Ironworks (remains) and Smart's Bridge	Industrial monument	Llanelly	51.8126°N 3.1196°W, SO229132		Brecknockshire	18th Century (Ironworks) and 19th Century (Bridge)	BR161
	Gilwern Embankment	Industrial monument	Llanelly	51.8237°N 3.0982°W, SO244144		Monmouthshire	18th Century	MM251
	Iron Furnace SW of Clydach	Industrial monument	Llanelly	51.8179°N 3.1148°W, SO232138	Llanelly Furnace.	Brecknockshire	17th Century	BR160
	Garnddyrys Ironworks (Site of) and adjacent Tramway	Industrial monument	Llanfoist Fawr	51.7999°N 3.0774°W, SO258118		Monmouthshire	Post Medieval	MM189
	The Graig Settlement	Settlement	Llanfoist Fawr	51.8409°N 3.0808°W, SO256163		Monmouthshire	Post Medieval	MM273
	Redbrook Incline Bridge	Bridge	Monmouth	51.7892°N 2.6733°W, SO536102	Carried Redbrook tin plate tramway until closure in 1872	Monmouthshire	Post Medieval	MM203
	Royal Navy Propellant Factory, Caerwent, Nitro-glycerine Hill	Industrial building	Caerwent	51.6228°N 2.7487°W, ST482918	An extensive site chosen for development for propellant manufacture due to natural slope and availability of water.	Monmouthshire	20th Century	MM352
	Royal Navy Propellant Factory, Caerwent Guided Weapons Scheme Static Firing Bay	Royal Naval Depot	Caerwent	51.6253°N 2.7555°W, ST478921	Built in 1959 to research and test the rocket booster engines for the Royal Navy's Sea Slug surface-to-air missiles	Monmouthshire	20th Century	MM341
	Dyne Steel Incline	Incline	Llanfoist Fawr, (also Blaenavon), (see also Torfaen)	51.7933°N 3.1017°W, SO241110		Monmouthshire	Post Medieval	MM280
	The Alcove, Piercefield	Folly	St Arvans	51.6496°N 2.6811°W, ST529947	Semi-octagonal platform with a semi-circular stone seat with views of the Wye Valley and cliffs below Chepstow castle. The first of the viewpoints constructed in around 1850, for the Piercefield walk. Originally roofed with an arch.	Monmouthshire	18th Century	MM285
	The Cold Bath, Piercefield	Bath-house	St Arvans	51.6681°N 2.6884°W, ST524968	Remains of a small rectangular brick and stone building which housed a tile-lined plunge pool.	Monmouthshire	18th Century	MM281
The Giant's Cave at Piercefield	The Giant's Cave, Piercefield	Cave	St Arvans	51.6633°N 2.6888°W, ST524962	Curved tunnel cut into the rockface. One of the features of the Piercefield Walk.	Monmouthshire	18th Century	MM282
Grotto on the Piercefield Walk	The Grotto, Piercefield	Grotto	St Arvans	51.6584°N 2.6766°W, ST532957	A small domed alcove made of brick and built to provide a shaded seat with views across the Wye Valley, and originally lined with iron cinders, copper and quartz. One of the features on the Piercefield Walk.	Monmouthshire	18th Century	MM283
The Platform on the Piercefield Walks	The Platform, Piercefield	Folly	St Arvans	51.655°N 2.6767°W, ST532953		Monmouthshire	18th Century	MM284

Scheduled monuments in Monmouthshire, Wales.
=Prehistoric =Roman =Early Medieval
=Medieval =Post-Medieval/Modern

== See also ==
- List of Cadw properties
- List of castles in Wales
- List of hill forts in Wales
- Historic houses in Wales
- List of monastic houses in Wales
- List of museums in Wales
- List of Roman villas in Wales
- Grade I listed buildings in Monmouthshire
- Grade II* listed buildings in Monmouthshire
- List of Scheduled Monuments in Newport
- List of Scheduled Monuments in Torfaen
- List of hillforts in Monmouthshire

== Notes ==
The Cadw schedule on which this list is based makes no distinctions between different prehistoric periods. The following notes explain where period classifications have been refined, based on the (cited) records from RCAHMW and/or Glamorgan-Gwent Archaeological Trust.
