= List of places in Monmouthshire =

Map of places in Monmouthshire compiled from this list
See the list of places in Wales for places in other principal areas.

This is a list of places in Monmouthshire, Wales, sorted alphabetically.

== A ==
Abergavenny, Abersychan

== B ==
Bedwellty, Betws Newydd, Black Rock, Blackwood, Blaenawey, Blaenavon, Blaina, Bryngwyn, Buckholt, Botany Bay

== C ==
Catbrook, Caer Llan, Caerwent, Caldicot, Chapel Hill, Chepstow, Clydach, Coed Morgan, Coed-y-paen, Crick, Croes y pant, Croes Hywel, Cross Ash, Crossway, Cwmcarvan, Cwmyoy

== D ==
Devauden, Dingestow, Dixton

== E ==
Earlswood

== G ==
Gaerllwyd, Gilwern, Glascoed, Goytre, Govilon, Great Oak, Grosmont, Gwehelog, Gwernesney

== H ==
Highmoor Hill, Hoaldalbert

== I ==
Itton

== K ==
Kemeys Commander, Kilgwrrwg Common, Kingcoed

== L ==
Little Mill, Llamrei, Llanarth, Llanbadoc, Llancayo, Llanddewi Rhydderch, Llandewi Skirrid, Llandegveth, Llandenny, Llandevenny, Llandogo, Llanellen, Llanelly, Llanfair Kilgeddin, Llanfihangel Rogiet, Llanfoist, Llanfrechfa, Llangattock-Lingoed, Llangattock-Vibon-Avel, Llangovan, Llangua, Llangwm, Llangybi, Llanhennock, Llanishen, Llanllowell, Llanover, Llansoy, Llantarnam, Llanthony, Llantilio Crossenny, Llantilio Pertholey, Llantrisant, Llanvair-Discoed, Llanvapley, Llanvetherine, Llanwenarth, Llanvihangel-Ystern-Llewern, Llanvihangel Crucorney, Llanvihangel Gobion

== M ==
Magor, Mamhilad, Maindee, Mardy, Maryland, Mathern, Maypole, Mitchel Troy, Mitcheltroy Common, Monkswood, Monmouth, Mounton, Mynydd-bâch, Mynyddislwyn

== N ==
Nant-y-derry, New Inn, New Mills, Newbridge-on-Usk, Newcastle, Newchurch, Newton Green

== O ==
Oldcastle

== P ==
Pandy, Panteg, Parkhouse, Pen-croes-oped, Pen-how, Pen-yr-hoel, Pen-y-cae-mawr, Pen-y-clawdd, Pen-twyn, Penallt, Penperlleni, Penrhos, Pontllanfraith, Pontnewynydd, Pontypool, Portskewett, Pwllmeyric

== R ==
Raglan, Redwick, Rhymney, Rockfield, Rogiet

== S ==
Shirenewton, Skenfrith, St Arvans, St Brides Netherwent, St. Maughans, St. Woolas, Sudbrook Rumney

== T ==
Talywain, The Bryn, Tintern, Tredunnock, Tregagle, Tregare, Trelleck Grange, Trelleck, Twyn-y-Sheriff, The Narth, Tydee

== U ==
Undy, Upper Green, Usk

== W ==
Wainfelin, Wernyrheolydd, Whitebrook, Whitson, Wilcrick, Wolvesnewton, Wonastow, Wyesham
