= List of hillforts in Monmouthshire =

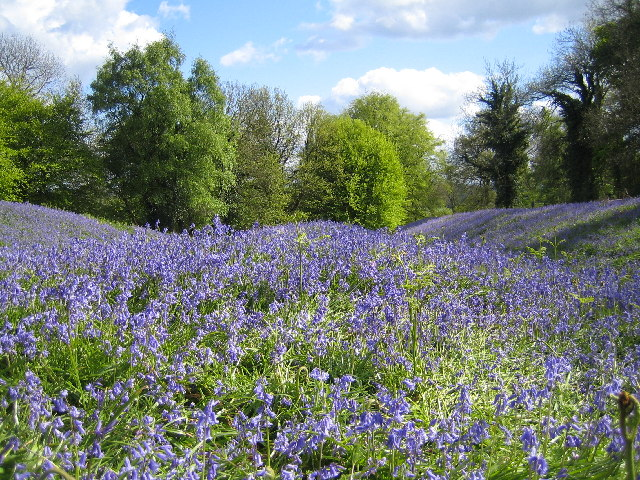
Coed y Bwnydd hillfort: in May.

This is a list of hillforts of Monmouthshire that have been registered with Cadw as historical monuments. Welsh names are in brackets.

Hillforts of Monmouthshire
Sam Number	Name	Community	OS Coordinates	Geographical coordinates
MM027	Blackcliff Wood	Tintern	ST529990	51°41′13″N 2°40′55″W
MM025	Gaer Hill Camp, Penterry (Allt y Gaer)	St Arvans	ST516979	51°40′37″N 2°42′00″W
MM069	The Larches	Caerwent	ST432899	51°36′18″N 2°49′12″W
MM079	Cae Camp (Bryngaer Colomendy)	Llanhennock	ST358938	51°38′20″N 2°55′37″W
MM077	Gaer hill fort, Trellech	Trellech	SO492037	51°43′48″N 2°44′06″W
MM078	Llancayo Camp (Llancayo)	Gwehelog Fawr	SO378038	51°43′44″N 2°54′07″W
MM105	Pen-rhiw or Great House hillfort	Llangwm	SO432033	51°43′34″N 2°49′23″W
MM020	Piercefield hillfort	St Arvans	ST536959	51°39′36″N 2°40′19″W
MM093	Bulwarks hillfort	Chepstow	ST538927	51°37′52″N 2°40′05″W
MM135	Candwr Camp (Bryngaer y Cawr)	Llanhennock	ST329934	51°38′06″N 2°58′08″W
MM075	Coed y Bwnydd hillfort	Llanarth	SO365068	51°45′22″N 2°55′12″W
MM062	Gaer Fawr, Llan-gwm	Llangwm	ST441988	51°41′06″N 2°48′32″W
MM024	Llanmelin Wood Camps (Coed Llanmelin)	Caerwent	ST461925	51°37′44″N 2°46′44″W
MM064	Pen-Twyn hillfort	Llanvihangel Crucorney	SO321229	51°54′04″N 2°59′13″W

== See also ==
- List of hill forts in Wales
- List of Scheduled Monuments in Monmouthshire
