= Monmouthshire County Council =

Local government of Monmouthshire, Wales

Monmouthshire County Council Cyngor Sir Fynwy (Welsh)

Type
- Type: Principal council of Monmouthshire

Leadership
- Chair: Tudor Thomas, Labour since 14 May 2026
- Leader: Mary Ann Brocklesby, Labour since 19 May 2022
- Chief Executive: Paul Matthews since 2009

Structure
- Seats: 46 councillors
- Graph of the party split among 46 seats.
- Political groups: Administration (19) Labour (18) Green (1) Other parties (27) Conservative (19) Independent (6) Plaid Cymru (2)
- Length of term: 5 years

Elections
- Voting system: First-past-the-post
- Last election: 5 May 2022
- Next election: 6 May 2027

Motto
- Utrique Fidelis (Faithful to both)

Meeting place
- County Hall, The Rhadyr, Usk, NP15 1GA

Website
- monmouthshire.gov.uk

Monmouthshire County Council (Welsh: Cyngor Sir Fynwy; or simply Monmouthshire Council) is the local authority for the county of Monmouthshire, one of the principal areas of Wales.

The current unitary authority was created in 1996 and covers the eastern three-fifths of the historic county of Monmouthshire. The county council is based at County Hall in the hamlet of The Rhadyr, near Usk.

Since the 2022 elections the council has been under no overall control, with Labour the largest party. The leader of the council since the 2022 elections has been Mary Ann Brocklesby of Labour.

== History ==
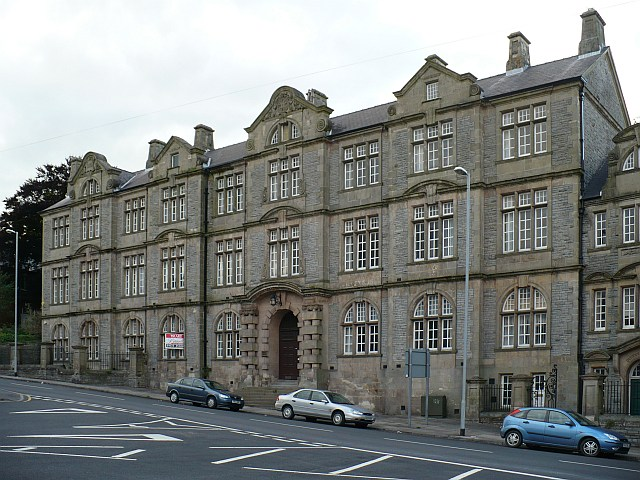
Shire Hall, Newport: Headquarters of the pre-1974 Monmouthshire County Council

The current Monmouthshire County Council is the second body of that name. The first Monmouthshire County Council was created in 1889 under the Local Government Act 1888, taking over the local government functions of the quarter sessions. That council was based in Newport, initially meeting at the town hall and later building itself headquarters at Shire Hall in 1902. In 1891, Newport was made a county borough, removing it from the administrative area of the county council, although the council continued to be based there.

The first Monmouthshire County Council was abolished in 1974 under the Local Government Act 1972, when the area was absorbed into the new county of Gwent. Gwent County Council moved its headquarters to a new County Hall at Croesyceiliog on the outskirts of Cwmbran, which was already under construction at the time of the 1974 reforms.

The current Monmouthshire County Council was created in 1996 under the Local Government (Wales) Act 1994, which abolished Gwent County Council and the area's five district councils, creating new unitary authorities. The new authorities in Gwent were based on the previous districts, with the new Monmouthshire authority covering the pre-1996 Monmouth Borough plus the community of Llanelly from Blaenau Gwent district.

== Political control ==
The council has been under no overall control since the 2022 election. Following that election a Labour minority administration formed to run the council. The Green Independent Group subsequently joined Labour to run the council as a coalition in May 2023.

The first election to the new council was held in 1995, initially operating as a shadow authority before coming into its powers on 1 April 1996. Political control of the council since 1996 has been as follows:

Party in control	Years
Labour	1996–1999
No overall control	1999–2004
Conservative	2004–2012
No overall control	2012–2017
Conservative	2017–2022
No overall control	2022–present

=== Leadership ===
The leaders of the council since 2002 have been:

Councillor	Party	From	To
Andrew Crump	Conservative		Jul 2002
David Waring	Labour	Jul 2002	Jun 2004
Andrew Crump	Conservative	Jun 2004	May 2008
Peter Fox	Conservative	May 2008	13 May 2021
Richard John	Conservative	13 May 2021	May 2022
Mary Ann Brocklesby	Labour	19 May 2022	

=== Composition ===
Following the 2022 election and subsequent changes up to October 2026, the composition of the council was:

Party	Seats
Conservative	19
Labour	19
Green	1
Independent	7
Total	46

Six of the independent councillors sit together as the "Independent Group", the other sits with the Green councillor as the "Green Independent Group". The latter group forms the part of the council's administration with Labour. The next election is due in 2027.

== Elections ==
Elections take place every five years. In the 2022 elections, Labour became the largest party, with 22 seats, and the Conservatives lost their overall majority, winning 18 of the 46 seats. The final result was decided by the toss of a coin after a tie between Conservative and Labour candidates in the ward of Llanfoist Fawr and Govilon; the seat was taken by the Conservatives. After the election, Labour formed a minority administration, with Mary Ann Brocklesby appointed as the first female leader of the council.

Year	Seats	Labour	Conservative	Others	Green	Liberal Democrats	Plaid Cymru	Notes
1995	42	**26**	11	4	0	1	0	Labour majority control
1999	42	18	**19**	4	0	1	0	No overall control; minority Labour administration
2004	43	9	**23**	5	0	4	2	Conservative majority control. New ward boundaries.
2008	43	7	**29**	1	0	5	1	Conservative majority control
2012	43	11	**19**	10	0	3	0	No overall control; Conservative-Liberal Democrat coalition
2017	43	10	**25**	5	0	3	0	Conservative majority control
2022	46	**22**	18	5	1	0	0	No overall control; minority Labour administration. New ward boundaries.

Party with the most elected councillors in bold. Coalition agreements in notes column.

== Premises ==
From 1996 until April 2012, the council's administrative headquarters were at the six-storey former Gwent County Hall at Croesyceiliog, Cwmbran – outside its own administrative area in the neighbouring borough of Torfaen and shared with Torfaen County Borough Council. It was closed because of "concrete cancer" and later demolished. In 2010 the authority had decided to relocate its headquarters functions to new offices at The Rhadyr in the community of Llanbadoc, just outside the town of Usk. Planning permission for the new building was granted in September 2011. The council moved to temporary offices in Magor while the new building was under construction.

A BBC television documentary "Carrying On at the Council" was broadcast in February 2012, after being filmed with Monmouthshire County Council over a period of seven months, in the lead up to their office move. The new county hall cost £6 million and was opened in 2013.

== Electoral districts, areas and communities ==
Electoral divisions in Monmouthshire

For the purposes of electing councillors, the principal area is divided into forty-two electoral divisions, each returning one councillor, except Llanelly, known as Llanelly Hill, which has two councillors. These divisions date from 2004.

The council operates a decentralised system of administration, with four area committees:

- Bryn y Cwm, covering the Abergavenny area
- Central Monmouthshire, centred on Monmouth
- Lower Wye, for the Chepstow area
- Severnside, the area around Caldicot

Although the council is described as a "unitary authority", there is in fact a second tier of government, with the entire area being divided into communities, all of which has either a town or community council.

=== Bryn y Cwm area ===
Electoral Division	Community	Other Places
Cantref	Abergavenny (Town) (part)	Knoll Estate
Castle	Abergavenny (Town) (part)	
Croesonen	Llantilio Pertholey (part)	Llwynu (part)
Crucorney	Crucorney and Grosmont	Campstone, Cupid's Hill, Cwmyoy, Forest Coal Pit, Grosmont, Henllan, Llangattock-Lingoed, Llangua, Llanthony, Llanvetherine, Llanfihangel Crucorney, Monmouth Cap, Pandy, Pedbidwal, Stanton, Wern Gifford
Goetre Fawr	Goetre Fawr	Little Mill, Mamhilad, Nant-y-derry, Pencroesoped, Penperlleni,
Grofield	Abergavenny (Town) (part)	
Lansdown	Abergavenny (Town) (part)	Llwynu (part), Major's Barn
Llanelly Hill	Llanelly	Blackrock, Clydach, Gellifelin, Gilwern, Maesygwartha, Waun Wen
Llanfoist Fawr	Llanfoist Fawr (part)	Belli-glas, Llanellen, Llanfoist
Llanover	Llanarth and Llanover	Aberffrwd, Betws newydd, Bryngwyn, Clytha, Croes Hywel, Llanarth, Llanddewi Rhydderch, Llanfair Kilgeddin, Llanvapley, Llanvihangel Gobion, Penpergwm, Pit Clytha, The Bryn, Upper Llanover, Wern-y-Cwrt,
Llanwenarth Ultra	Llanfoist Fawr (part)	Govilon, Llanwenarth
Mardy	Llantilio Pertholey (part)	Bryngwenin, Llanddewi Skirrid,
Priory	Abergavenny (Town) (part)	

=== Central Monmouthshire area ===
Electoral Division	Community	Other Places
Dixton with Osbaston	Monmouth (Town) (part)	Buckholt, Osbaston, Dixton, Dixton Road, Town Centre (part), Manson, Manson Cross, Leasbrook Lane, Newton Court
Drybridge	Monmouth (Town) (part)	Ancrehill, Brook Estate
Llanbadoc	Gwehelog Fawr and Llanbadoc	Glascoed, Gwehelog, Kemeys Commander, Llancayo, Monkswood, Rhadyr, Trostrey
Llangybi Fawr	Llangybi, Llanhennock and Llantrisant Fawr	Coed y paen, Gwernesney, Newbridge-on-Usk, Llandegveth, Llanllowell, Llangybi, Llantrisant, Tredunnock
Llantilio Crossenny	Llangattock-Vibon-Avel and Llantilio Crossenny	Bont, Caggle Street, Cross Ash, Llanvihangel-Ystern-Llewern, Norton, Rockfield, St. Maughans, Skenfrith, Tal-y-coed, Treadam, Walson
Mitchel Troy	Mitchel Troy	Cwmcarvan, Dingestow, Jingle Street, Wonastow, Tregare, Lydart (part)
Overmonnow	Monmouth (Town) (part)	Wonastow Road
Raglan	Raglan	Coed-y-fedw, Kingcoed, Llandenny, Llangovan, Pen-y-clawdd, Twyn y Sheriff
Trellech United	Trellech United	Catbrook, Hoop, Llandogo, Llanishen, Maryland, Penallt, The Narth, Treleck, Whitebrook
Usk	Usk (Town)	
Wyesham	Monmouth (Town) (part)	Wyesham, Hadnock, The Kymin

=== Lower Wye area ===
Electoral Division	Community	Other areas
Caerwent	Caerwent	Carrow Hill, Crick, Five Lanes, Llanvair Discoed, Trewen, St. Brides Netherwent, Carrow Hill, Highmoor Hill
Devauden	Devauden and Llangwm	Cobbler's Plain, Gaer Fawr, Howick, Itton, Llanfihangel Tor-y-Mynydd, Llangwm, Llansoy, Star Hill, Wolvesnewton
Larkfield	Chepstow (part)	Bulwark (part), High Beech, Hardwick Hill, Hardwick Court, Garden City (part)
St Arvans	St Arvans and Tintern	Barbadoes Green, Botany Bay, Chapel Hill, Porthcasseg, Parkhouse, The Cot
St Christopher's	Chepstow (part)	Bulwark (part), The Triangle
St Kingsmark	Chepstow (part)	St. Lawrence Park, The Danes, Bayfield Hamlet, The Bayfields, Crossway Green
St Mary's	Chepstow (part)	Chepstow Town Centre, Lower Chepstow, Garden City
Shirenewton	Mathern and Shirenewton	Bullyhole Bottom, Earlswood, Gaerllwyd, Mathern, Mounton, Mynydd-bâch, Newton Green, Pwllmeyric, Pen-y-Cae Mawr, Haysgate
Thornwell	Chepstow (part)	Bulwark (part), Thornwell

=== Severnside ===
Electoral Division	Community	Other areas
Caldicot Castle	Caldicot (Town) (part)	
Dewstow	Caldicot (Town) (part)	
Green Lane	Caldicot (Town) (part)	
Mill	Magor with Undy (part)	Knollbury, Llandevenny, Magor
Portskewett	Portskewett	Ifton, Leechpool, Mount Ballan, Sudbrook
Rogiet	Rogiet	Llanfihangel Rogiet
Severn	Caldicot (Town) (part)	Deepweir
The Elms	Magor with Undy (part)	St. Bride's Netherwent, Undy, Vinegar Hill
West End	Caldicot (Town) (part)	
