= Maypole (disambiguation) =

A maypole is a tall wooden pole.

Maypole may also refer to:

== People ==
- George M. Maypole (1883–1956), American politician

== Places ==
- Maypole, Birmingham, England
- Maypole, Isles of Scilly, Cornwall, England
- Maypole, Bromley, a district in the London Borough of Bromley
- Maypole, Canterbury, Kent, England, near Hoath
- Maypole, Dartford, Kent, England, within the Greater London Built-up Area
- Maypole, Monmouthshire, Wales, a place in Monmouthshire
- The Maypole, Salford, a former public house in Salford, England

== Other uses ==
- "The Maypole", a poem by Gruffudd ab Adda
- Maypole Dairy Company, an early chain of British dairies
- Maypole framework, a computer web development framework
- Maypole Group, a chain of Maltese bakeries
