= List of scheduled monuments in Torfaen =

The county borough of Torfaen is in the south-east corner of Wales, occupying the valley of the Afon Llwyd, from Cwmbran and Pontypool up to Blaenavon. With only 2 prehistoric and 5 medieval scheduled sites, the list, like the landscape, is dominated by the Industrial monuments of the 18th and 19th centuries. In particular, the Blaenavon Industrial Landscape is a World Heritage Site. Of the 25 monuments, 14 are found within the Blaenavon Community. All of the Torfaen administrative area lies within the historic county of Monmouthshire.

Scheduled monuments have statutory protection. The compilation of the list is undertaken by Cadw Welsh Historic Monuments, which is an executive agency of the National Assembly of Wales. The list of scheduled monuments below is supplied by Cadw with additional material from RCAHMW and Glamorgan-Gwent Archaeological Trust.

== Scheduled monuments in Torfaen ==
Image	Name	Site type	Community	Location	Details	Period	SAM No & Refs
	Carn-y-Defaid Round Cairns	Round cairn	Blaenavon, (also Llanfoist Fawr), (see also Monmouthshire)	51.7842°N 3.0585°W, SO270100		Prehistoric	MM209
	Cairns (4) West of Craig y Dyffryn	Round cairn	Henllys	51.6285°N 3.0835°W, ST251927		Prehistoric	MM045
	Capel Newydd, Blaenavon (site of)	Chapel	Blaenavon	51.763°N 3.0592°W, SO269076		Medieval	MM212
	Llanderfel Church	Church	Fairwater	51.6516°N 3.0653°W, ST263953		Medieval	MM271
	St. Peter's Churchyard Cross, Henllys	Cross	Henllys	51.6132°N 3.059°W, ST267910		Medieval	MM309
	Llantarnam Churchyard Cross	Cross	Llantarnam	51.6328°N 3.0028°W, ST306931	Socket and shaft of a medieval cross, with modern steps and cross-head.	Medieval	MM136
	Llantarnam Abbey Tithe Barn	Tithe barn	Llantarnam	51.6317°N 2.9954°W, ST312930	Long presumed to be an abbey building, this is now thought to be a 17th-century building	Medieval	MM137
	Abersychan Limestone Railway	Railway	Abersychan	51.7324°N 3.0519°W, SO274042	Built c 1830 to carry limestone from Cwm Lascarn quarry to the British Ironworks.	Post Medieval/Modern	GM597
	Air Furnace at British Ironworks	Ironworks	Abersychan	51.7262°N 3.0769°W, SO257036	Rare remains of a reverbatory air furnace used for re-melting cast iron. The furnace is in the courtyard of the derelict foundry buildings.	Post-Medieval/Modern	MM221
Disused pumping engine house at British Colliery	British Colliery Pumping Engine House	Engine house	Abersychan	51.7266°N 3.0751°W, SO258036	Cornish beam pumping engine house built by the British Iron Company. Built of sandstone with a slate roof, and retains several fixtures.	Post-Medieval/Modern	MM216
	Cwmbyrgwm Colliery	Coal Mine	Abersychan	51.7236°N 3.0858°W, SO252033	Site of former colliery including remains of a water-balance headgear, chimney, oval shafts, water power dams, tramroad routes, and waste tips.	Post-Medieval/Modern	MM163
	Aaron Brute's Level and Iron Bridge	Level	Blaenavon	51.7728°N 3.0909°W, SO248088		Post-Medieval/Modern	MM220
Two furnaces at Blaenafon Ironworks	Blaenavon Ironworks	Industrial monument	Blaenavon	51.777°N 3.0892°W, SO249092		Post-Medieval/Modern	MM200
	Blaenavon Upper Brick Yard	Quarry	Blaenavon	51.781°N 3.087°W, SO251097	Also known as Bunker Hill Brick Yard.	Post-Medieval/Modern	MM296
	Brake Engine on Hill Pits Tramroad Incline	Industrial monument	Blaenavon	51.7826°N 3.099°W, SO242098		Post-Medieval/Modern	MM222
	Coal and Iron Ore Workings West of Abergavenny Road, Blaenavon	Iron mine	Blaenavon	51.7869°N 3.084°W, SO253103		Post-Medieval/Modern	MM297
	Coity Sandstone Quarry and Incline	Quarry	Blaenavon	51.7699°N 3.1102°W, SO234084		Post-Medieval/Modern	MM279
Dyne Steel tramway above Pwll-du	Dyne Steel Incline	Incline	Blaenavon, (also Llanfoist Fawr), (see also Monmouthshire)	51.7933°N 3.1017°W, SO241110		Post-Medieval/Modern	MM280
	Engine Pit, Blaenavon	Coal Mine	Blaenavon	51.7747°N 3.0972°W, SO243090	Earliest Blaenafon shaft coalmine, sunk in 1806	Post-Medieval/Modern	MM277
	Iron and coal patching at Pen-ffordd-goch (Keeper's Pond), Blaenavon	Industrial monument	Blaenavon, (also Llanfoist Fawr), (see also Monmouthshire)	51.7882°N 3.0773°W, SO257104		Post-Medieval/Modern	MM227
	Ironstone Quarries at Carreg Maen Taro	Quarry	Blaenavon, (also Llanfoist Fawr and Llanelly), (see also Monmouthshire)	51.794°N 3.1056°W, SO238111		Post-Medieval/Modern	MM295
	Old Coal Pits, Blaenavon	Air Shaft	Blaenavon	51.7795°N 3.0974°W, SO243095		Post-Medieval/Modern	MM293
Pwll Du Tram Tunnel (south portal)	Pwll Du Tramroad Tunnel Southern Approach	Industrial monument	Blaenavon	51.7814°N 3.0905°W, SO248096		Post-Medieval/Modern	MM223
	Iron Ore Scours at Upper Race, Pontypool	Industrial monument	Pontymoile	51.6815°N 3.0486°W, ST276986		Post-Medieval/Modern	MM256
	Old Beam Pump & Winding Engine, Glyn Pits	Industrial building	Pontymoile	51.6924°N 3.0638°W, ST265998		Post-Medieval/Modern	MM192

Scheduled Monuments in Torfaen, Wales.
=Prehistoric =Roman =Early Medieval
=Medieval =Post-Medieval/Modern

== See also ==
- List of Cadw properties
- List of castles in Wales
- List of hill forts in Wales
- Historic houses in Wales
- List of monastic houses in Wales
- List of museums in Wales
- List of Roman villas in Wales
- Grade I listed buildings in Torfaen
- Grade II* listed buildings in Torfaen
