= Manor Farmhouse, Crick =

Historic building in Crick, Monmouthshire, Wales

Manor Farmhouse
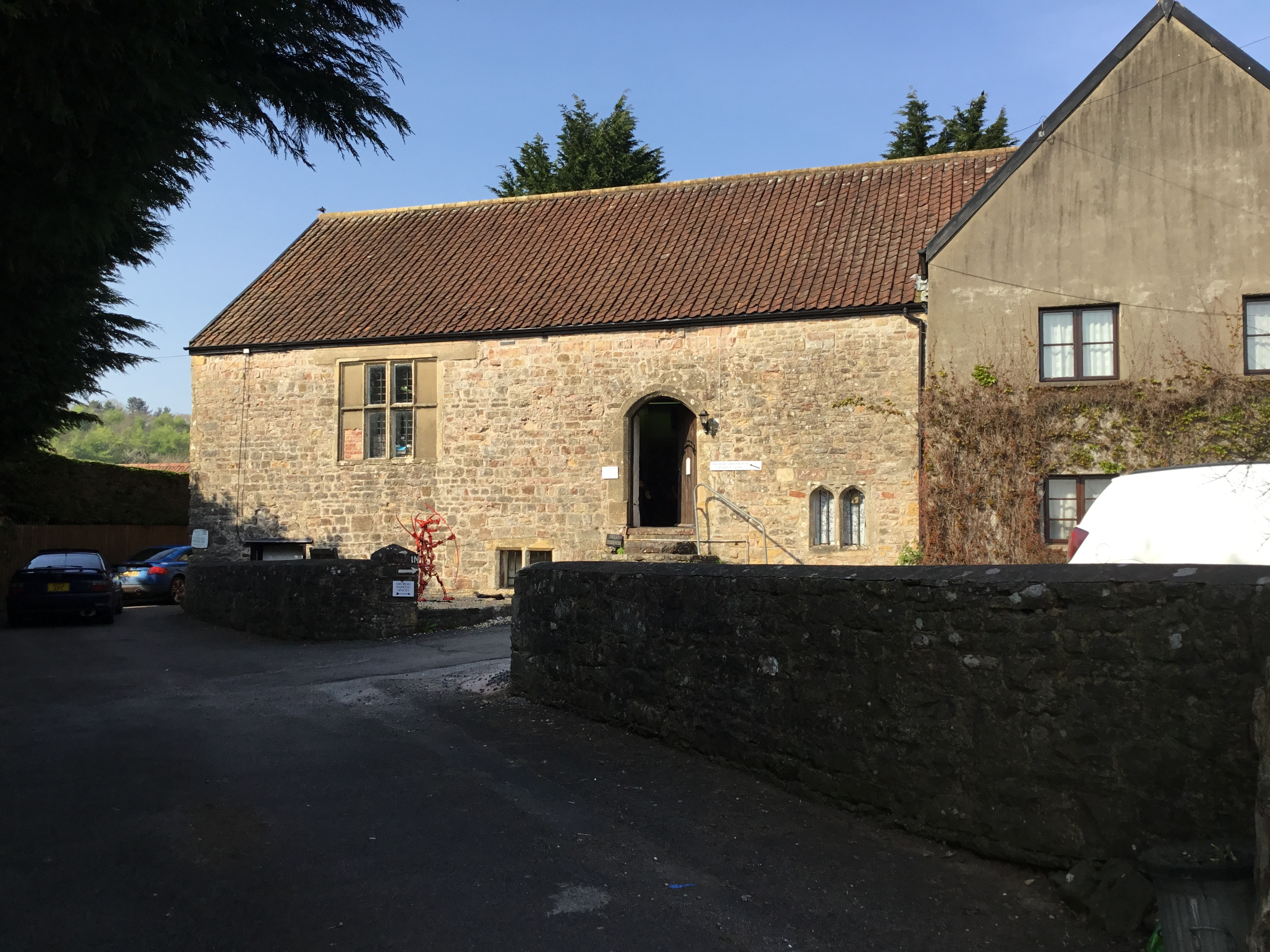
- "A badly compromised manorial group"

- Location within Monmouthshire
- 51.6088°N 2.7374°W
- Type: House
- Location: Crick, Monmouthshire

History
- Built: late 15th century onwards

Site notes
- Architectural style: vernacular
- Governing body: Privately owned

Listed Building – Grade II*
- Official name: Manor Farmhouse and Welsh Archery Centre
- Designated: 19 August 1955
- Reference no.: 2038

Scheduled monument
- Official name: Medieval hall at Manor Farmhouse
- Designated: 19 August 1955
- Reference no.: MON053

Listed Building – Grade II
- Official name: St Nyvern's Chapel Cottage
- Designated: 19 August 1955
- Reference no.: 2039

Manor Farmhouse, or Crick Manor, Crick, Monmouthshire is a late medieval manor house dating from the 15th century. The buildings comprise a chapel, of 13th century origins, now a separate house, the medieval, stone hall, and a 16th-century wing. The buildings were originally constructed for the Denefords, and extended by their descendants, the Moores. In the 17th century, Nicholas Moore, High Sheriff of Monmouthshire entertained Charles I at the manor. The grouping has been "badly compromised" in later centuries. The house, privately owned and accommodating an archery centre, is Grade II* listed.

== History ==
The earliest part of the grouping is the chapel of St Nyvern, constructed by Sir William Deneford or his son in the late 13th century. This was still in use as a chapel in the 16th century, when it was the site of Nicholas Moore's marriage on 13 January 1616. The chapel was subsequently converted to a barn and is now a private house. In the late medieval period the Moores, descendants of the Denefords, constructed the hall house that stands to the right of the chapel. At the end of the First English Civil War, in July 1645, Nicholas twice entertained Charles I at the house. In the 18th century, the manor was remodelled and extended. In the early 20th century, when owned by Monmouthshire County Council, further reconstruction was undertaken. Returned to private ownership in the late 20th century, the building now houses a commercial archery centre.

== Architecture and description ==
The manor is constructed of rubble with modern rendering. The building comprises the main range, largely 18th century in origin, with the medieval hall behind it. The roofs are modern, but the undercroft on which the hall stands is extant. The complex is listed Grade II* with the chapel having a separate Grade II listing. The hall is also a scheduled monument. The architectural historian John Newman describes the whole grouping as "badly compromised".
