= Govilon =

Village in Monmouthshire, Wales

Coordinates: 51°49′N 3°04′W

Govilon: Welsh: Gofilon
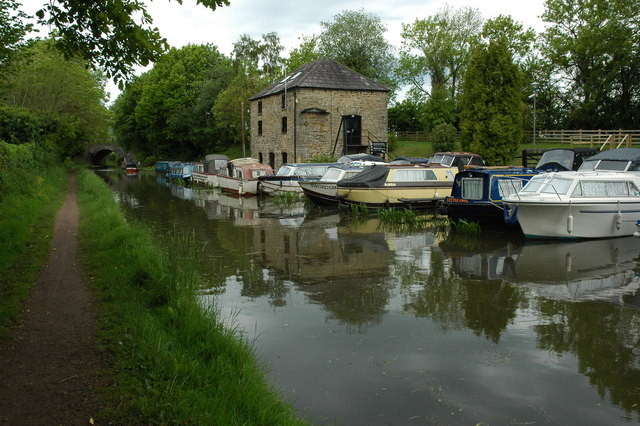
- Govilon Wharf on the Monmouthshire and Brecon Canal

- Location within Monmouthshire
- Population: 1,447 (2011)
- Principal area: Monmouthshire
- Preserved county: Gwent
- Country: Wales
- Sovereign state: United Kingdom
- Post town: ABERGAVENNY
- Postcode district: NP7
- Dialling code: 01873
- Police: Gwent
- Fire: South Wales
- Ambulance: Welsh
- UK Parliament: Monmouth

Govilon (Welsh: Gofilon) is a small Welsh village located between Llanfoist and Gilwern near Abergavenny in north Monmouthshire. It is part of the community of Llanfoist Fawr. The population was 1,447 in 2011.

== Attractions ==
The Monmouthshire and Brecon Canal passes through the village. The village has views overlooking the valley of the River Usk and up to the heights of the southern flank of the Black Mountains, Wales. Llanwenarth House, nearby, was built in the 16th century and is operated as a hotel.

== Governance ==
The Llanwenarth Ultra ward (covering Govilon) elects a county councillor to Monmouthshire County Council. Llanwenarth Ultra is also a community ward, electing or co-opting up to six of the twelve community councillors to Llanfoist Fawr Community Council.
