= Llanwenarth Ultra =

Coordinates: 51.813°N 3.073°W

- Electoral ward
- Location within Monmouthshire
- Population: 1,447 (2011 census)
- Community: Llanfoist Fawr
- Principal area: Monmouthshire
- Country: Wales
- Sovereign state: United Kingdom
- UK Parliament: Monmouth
- Senedd Cymru – Welsh Parliament: Monmouth
- Councillors: 1 (County), 6 (Community)

Llanwenarth Ultra is an electoral ward near Abergavenny, Monmouthshire. The ward elects councillors to Llanfoist Fawr Community Council and Monmouthshire County Council.

== History and description ==
The ward (previously a civil parish) is based around the main population centre of Govilon, a large village between Gilwern (to the west) and Llanfoist (to the east).

Llanwenarth Ultra was originally a civil parish, formed from 2,433 acres of the civil parish of Llanwenarth Citra in 1874. At the end of the 19th century Govilon had a population of 500 and its own railway station on the Abergavenny and Merthyr branch of the London and North Western Railway. Llanwenarth Ultra has been part of the Llanfoist Fawr community since the 1970s.

According to the 2001 UK Census the population of the Llanwenarth Ultra ward was 1,354, increasing to 1,447 by the 2011 UK Census.

== Community Council elections ==
Being part of the community of Llanfoist Fawr, Llanwenarth Ultra is a community ward electing or co-opting up to six of the twelve community councillors to Llanfoist Fawr Community Council. Prior to the May 2017 elections only two nominations were received, leading to four seats remaining vacant.

== County Council elections ==
The Llanwenarth Ultra ward has elected one county councillor to Monmouthshire County Council since 1995. Prior to 1995 Llanwenarth Ultra was part of the Llanover ward for elections to Gwent County Council.

Since the first elections to Monmouthshire County Council in 1995 the ward has been represented by the Labour Party.
