= Mardy, Monmouthshire =

Village in Monmouthshire, Wales

Coordinates: 51.83828°N 3.00868°W

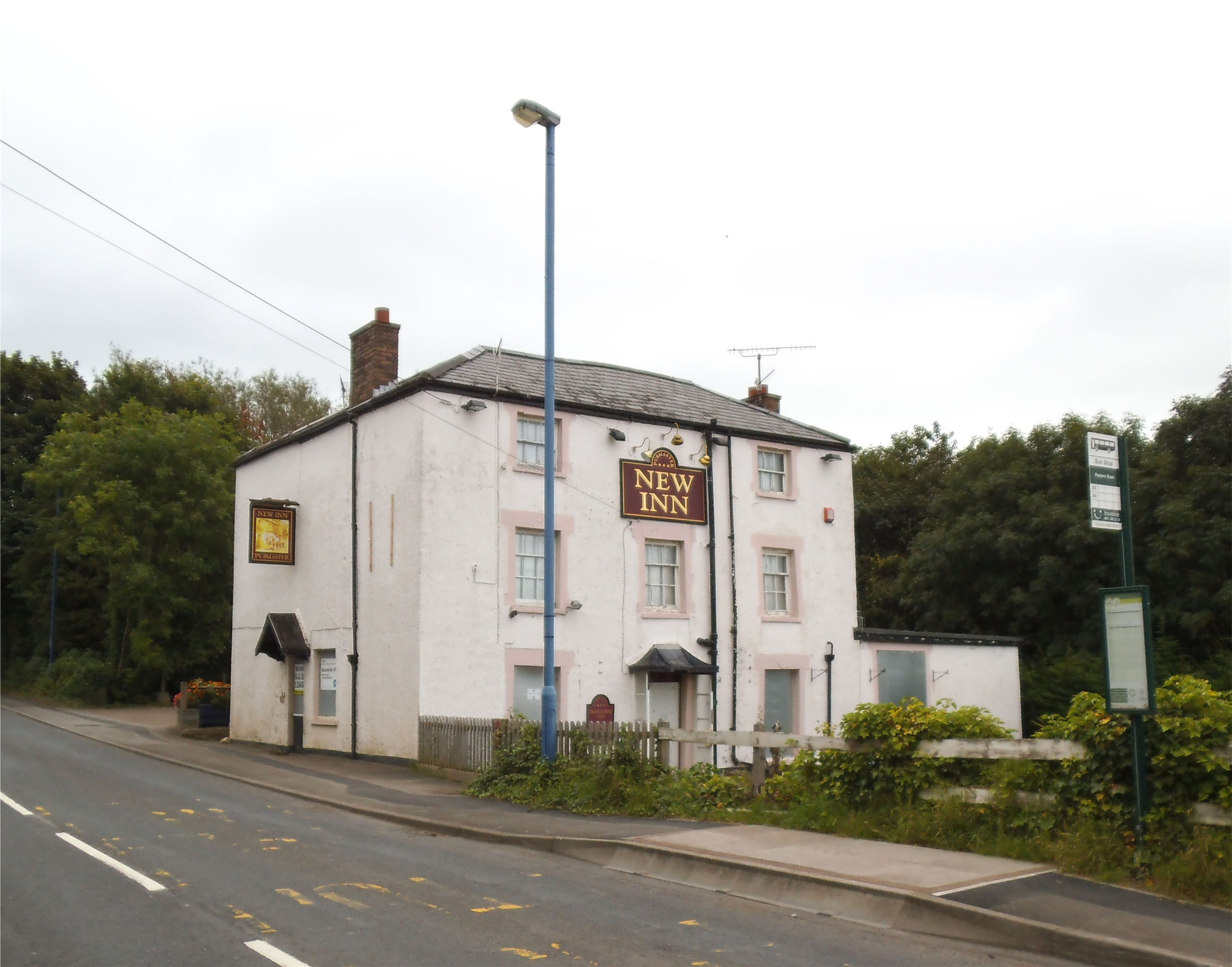
New Inn, Mardy

The Mardy (Welsh: Y Maerdy) is a village in Monmouthshire, south east Wales.

== Location ==
Mardy is located immediately to the north of the market town of Abergavenny. On old maps, the Mardy has the Welsh spelling Maerdy.

== History and amenities ==
The Mardy has a close community and a varied mix of housing types and ages ranging from old farms recently built executive style homes. There is church one mile further north at Llantilio Pertholey. When the old Llantilio Pertholey Junior and infants mixed school was closed a new one was opened adjacent to the Mardy World War II camp but retained the name Llantilio Pertholey School.

== Governance ==
Mardy is also an electoral ward, formed from part of the Llantilio Pertholey community. It elects one county councillor to Monmouthshire County Council.
