= Monkswood =

Area of Welwyn Garden City, Hertfordshire, England

Coordinates: 51°49.2′N 0°12.3′W

Monkswood is a small residential area in Welwyn Garden City, Hertfordshire, England.

The area contains around 300 houses and flats and the population is about 500. The Monks Walk School, Shoplands shopping parade and Welwyn Garden City Cricket Club are nearby.

The area is served by a number of local bus services to Welwyn Garden City town centre, Welwyn Village, and Stevenage.
