= Hygga House Dovecote, Trellech =

Hygga House Dovecote
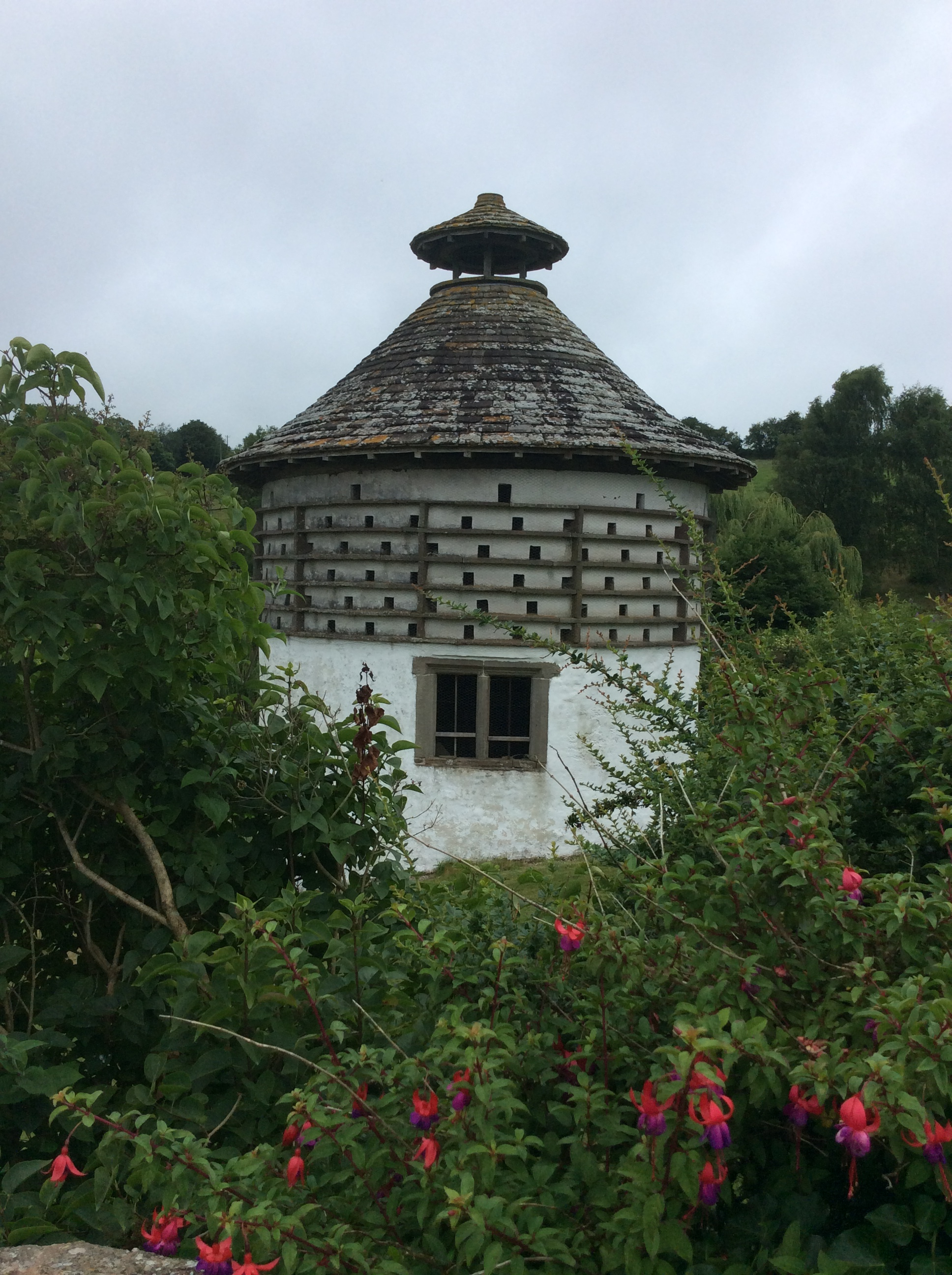
- "a particularly fine and complete example"

- Location within Monmouthshire
- 51.7292°N 2.7462°W
- Type: Dovecote
- Location: Hygga, Trellech, Monmouthshire, Wales

History
- Built: late 16th century

Site notes
- Architectural style: Vernacular
- Governing body: Privately owned

Listed Building – Grade II*
- Official name: Dovecote at Hygga House
- Designated: 1 May 1952
- Reference no.: 2071

Scheduled monument
- Official name: Dovecote at Hygga Farm
- Reference no.: MM150

The Dovecote, Hygga, Trellech, Monmouthshire is a late 16th-century dovecote, in an unusually complete state of preservation. Part of the service buildings for the, now demolished, Hygga House, the dovecote is a Grade II* listed building and a scheduled monument.

== History and description ==
The origin of the name Hygga is Old Norse, meaning "to comfort". In the 16th century, a substantial mansion, Hygga House, stood on the site but it has since been demolished. (Note: The Royal Commission on the Ancient and Historical Monuments of Wales suggests that the house may have had monastic origins.) The dovecote, along with a large barn and a shippon and stables, comprised a range of service buildings for the house. In a poor state of repair for over two centuries, the dovecote was fully restored in the 1980s and now forms a rare example of a complete 16th-century dovecote. (Note: Although Cadw clearly records the restoration as taking place "in the 1980s", Elisabeth Whittle, in her study, A Guide to Ancient and Historic Wales: Glamorgan and Gwent, published in 1992, described it as "a circular stone dovecote, whose tiled roof has fallen in".) Sir Cyril Fox and Lord Raglan, in their three-volume guide Monmouthshire Houses, note the rarity of such dovecotes within the county, citing one at Llantellen, Skenfrith as the only other known example. In his study, A Book of Dovecotes published in 1920, Arthur Owens Cooke in fact noted three; at Court Farm, Llanvair Discoed; at St Pierre; and at Llanthony Priory; but does not record Hygga. (Note: Cooke, in the Herefordshire chapter of his book, lamented the destruction of so many dovecotes in the early 20th century and implored owners not to permit the growth of ivy on those that remained; "above all set [your] faces against ivy, that most dangerous foe of masonry. To turn the dovecote into a green bower may be picturesque, but means disaster in the end".) The architectural historian John Newman gives a dating for the dovecote, and the associated barns, of c.1600.

The dovecote is constructed of lime-washed stone rubble, with a "stone-slated conical roof". Unusually for a dovecote, it has windows with ovolo mullions. Above the windows are six tiers of nesting boxes, set into the wall. The dovecote is a Scheduled monument, and a Grade II* listed building, its listing recording the dovecote as a "particularly fine and complete example".

== Sources ==
- Cooke, Arthur Owens (1920). A Book of Dovecotes. London: T. N. Foulis. OCLC 1965568.
- Fox, Cyril; Raglan, Lord (1994) [1954]. Renaissance Houses. Monmouthshire Houses. Vol. 3. Cardiff: Merton Priory Press Ltd & The National Museum of Wales. ISBN 1-898937-00-1. OCLC 776066469.
- Newman, John (2000). Gwent/Monmouthshire. The Buildings of Wales. London: Penguin. ISBN 0-14-071053-1.
- — (2009). Griffiths, Ralph A.; Madeline, Gray; Prys, Morgan (eds.). The Making of Monmouthshire, 1536-1780. The Gwent County History. Vol. 3. Cardiff: University of Wales Press. ISBN 978-0-7083-2198-0. OCLC 895978900.
- Whittle, Elisabeth (1992). A Guide to Ancient and Historic Wales: Glamorgan and Gwent. London: HMSO. ISBN 9780117012219. OCLC 30739843.
