= Penterry =

Coordinates: 51.684987°N 2.697159°W

Penterry: Welsh: Penteri
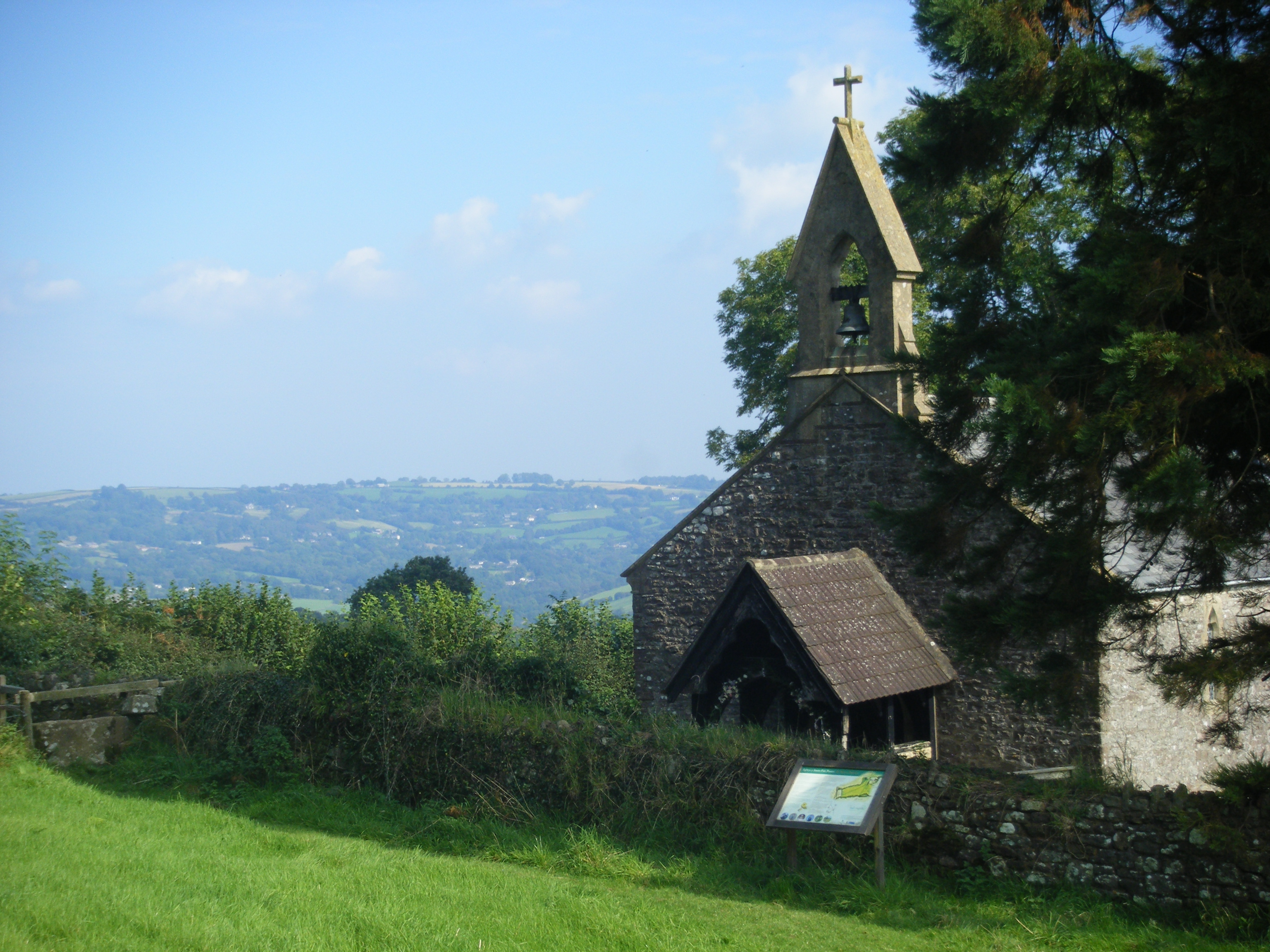
- The Church of St. Mary at Penterry

- Location within Monmouthshire
- Principal area: Monmouthshire
- Preserved county: Gwent
- Country: Wales
- Sovereign state: United Kingdom
- Post town: CHEPSTOW
- Postcode district: NP16
- Dialling code: 01291
- Police: Gwent
- Fire: South Wales
- Ambulance: Welsh
- UK Parliament: Monmouth

Penterry (Welsh: Penteri) is a small rural parish of 479 acres (1.94 km^{2}) in Monmouthshire, Wales. It is located between the villages of St. Arvans and Tintern, about 4 miles (6.4 km) north of Chepstow, within the Wye Valley Area of Outstanding Natural Beauty and about 2 miles (3.2 km) from the border with England. It now contains an isolated parish church adjoining the site of a deserted village, and a few farms.

== History ==
The first evidence of human habitation in the parish is a hill fort at Gaer Hill. This provides a panoramic and strategically important view towards the Severn estuary, and is believed to have been an Iron Age base and lookout point for the Silures. Because of its similarities with another monument on Holyhead Mountain in Anglesey, it is thought possible that the inner earthwork is a Roman signal station lying within an earlier defensive enclosure.

Although the area is now quite remote, Penterry was originally located beside the Roman road (locally called Piccadilly) between the Severn estuary in the south and the small fort at Blestium, now Monmouth. The ancient road was superseded in later centuries, other than for local traffic, by that through Devauden to the west (now the B4293), and in the 19th century by the turnpike road through Tintern to the east (now the A466).

The church at Penterry is dedicated to St. Mary, and is located in an isolated position within a field. It was first mentioned in a charter in 955 AD. By the 13th century part of the parish had become a grange of nearby Tintern Abbey. In some documents the grange is described as a Secular Firmary, suggesting that it either housed or maintained a hospital for local people. Its distance from the abbey - about 1 mile (1.6 km) - may have been to guard against the spread of infection. The present church was largely rebuilt in the mid-19th century, but retains two medieval windows and the base of a stone cross.

The area is believed to have been severely affected by the Black Death, and a grove of trees near the church has been identified as a plague pit. The remains of house platforms and gardens can still be seen under the turf in the field south of the church.

The local population again declined during the 19th century, because of a fall in demand for labour to work in the nearby woods. The parish had 60 residents in 1821, but only 20 in 1911.
