= John Gardnor =

English painter (1729–1808)

John Gardnor (1729–1808), was an English painter.

Gardnor began life as a drawing-master, teaching drawing, painting, and calligraphy. As such he had an academy in Kensington Square. In 1763 he exhibited with the Free Society of Artists, sending two drawings with a specimen of penmanship. He exhibited with the same society in the following years up to 1767; in 1766 and 1767 contributions were also sent by 'Mr. Gardnor's pupils.' In 1767 he received a premium of twenty-five guineas from the Society of Arts.

Gardnor seems now to have quit the profession of drawing for the church, and took orders. In 1778 he was instituted to the vicarage of St Mary's Church, Battersea, which he continued to hold up to his death. As vicar of Battersea Gardnor officiated on 18 Aug. 1782 at the wedding of William Blake.

In 1782 Gardnor exhibited again, this time at the Royal Academy, sending two landscapes, and continued to be a frequent contributor of landscapes and views up to 1796. On 16 May 1787 Gardnor started with his nephew Richard on a tour to Paris, Geneva, Lausanne, Basle, Strasburg, and back down the Rhine. He made numerous drawings of the scenery on the Rhine, which he published in folio parts, the first of which appeared in 1788 entitled Views taken on and near the River Rhine, at Aix-la-Chapelle, and on the River Maese. These views were engraved in aquatint by Elizabeth and William Ellis, Robert Dodd, Samuel Alken, J. S. Robinson and by Gardnor himself. A smaller edition was published in 1792, in which the aquatints were executed by Gardnor and his nephew. Gardnor also executed a series of views in Monmouthshire for David Williams's History of Monmouthshire, published in 1796; they were engraved in aquatint by Gardnor himself and J. Hill. In 1798 a sermon was printed which he preached before the armed association of Battersea.

Gardnor died on 6 January 1808, at the age of 79. He was buried in Battersea Church.
