= Gaerllwyd =

Coordinates: 51°39′57″N 2°47′58″W

Gaerllwyd: Welsh: Gaer-lwyd
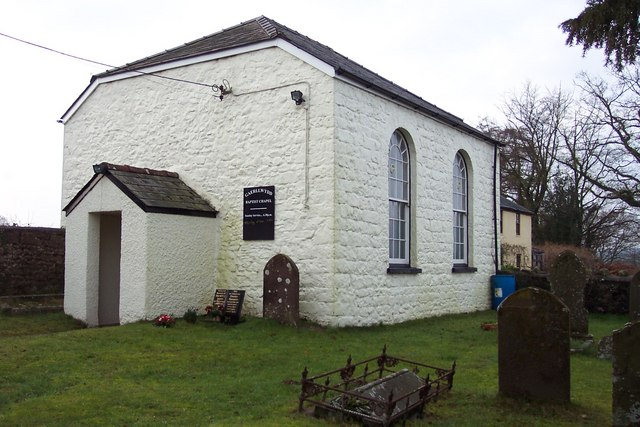
- Gaerllwyd Baptist Chapel

- Location within Monmouthshire
- Community: Shirenewton
- Principal area: Monmouthshire
- Preserved county: Gwent
- Country: Wales
- Sovereign state: United Kingdom
- Post town: USK
- Postcode district: NP
- Police: Gwent
- Fire: South Wales
- Ambulance: Welsh
- UK Parliament: Monmouth

Gaerllwyd (Welsh: Gaer-lwyd) is a village in the community of Shirenewton, in Monmouthshire, south east Wales.

== Location ==
Gaerllwyd is located 6 miles (9.7 km) south east of Usk and 7 miles (11 km) north west of Chepstow on the B4235 road.

== History and amenities ==
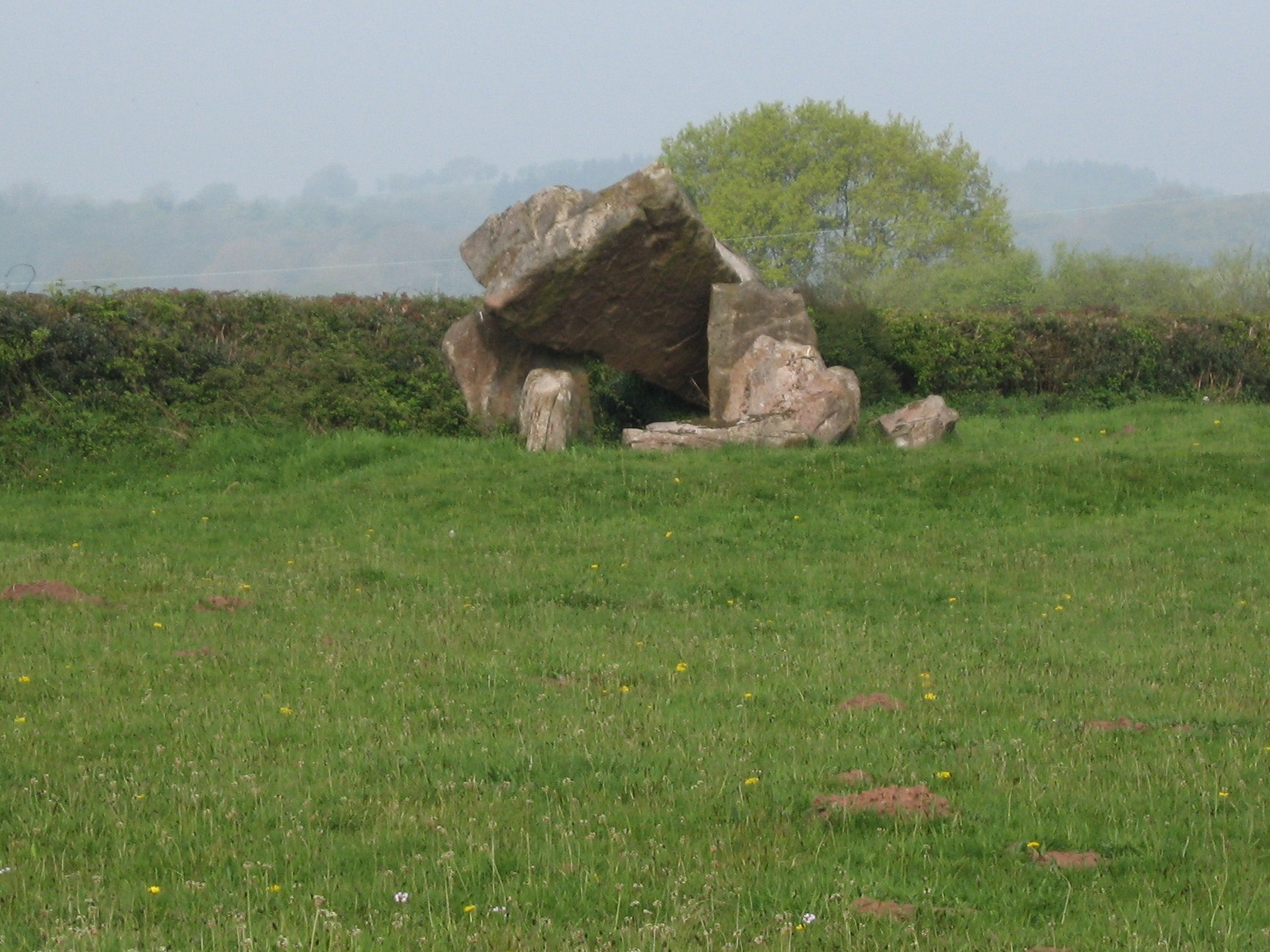
Gaerllwyd burial chamber

Gaerllwyd is set in a very rural agricultural area in the heart of Monmouthshire. There is a Neolithic burial chamber, or cromlech dated to around 4,000 BC. It is made up of a capstone which would have had three upright stone supports. The outer cairn has been removed by road construction and stone robbing, although archaeologists are uncertain whether a covering mound would ever have been in place. To the south there are some Early Bronze Age monuments including two stone circles, a standing stone and a round barrow cemetery.

The village has a Baptist chapel, situated on the Gaerllwyd Crossroads, which is still in regular religious use. It is a Grade II listed building.
