= Gaer hillfort, Trellech =

Hillfort in Trellech, Monmouthshire, Wales

Coordinates: 51.7304°N 2.7355°W

Location of Gaer hillfort in Wales

Gaer hillfort (Welsh: Bryngaer Croes Trelech) is a Celtic Iron Age hillfort near Trellech in Monmouthshire, Wales (grid reference SO492037).

This fort was registered by Cadw and is identified with the number SAM: MM077. There are approximately 300 hillforts in CADW's list of monuments, although archaeologists believe there were nearly 600 in total.

== See also ==
- List of hillforts in Wales
