= Earlswood, Monmouthshire =

Coordinates: 51.6615°N 2.8043°W

Earlswood: Welsh: Coed-yr-iarll
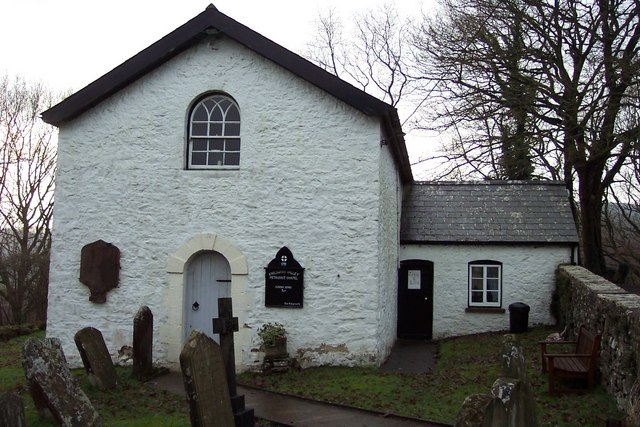
- Methodist chapel

- Location within Monmouthshire
- Principal area: Monmouthshire
- Preserved county: Gwent
- Country: Wales
- Sovereign state: United Kingdom
- Post town: USK
- Postcode district: NP
- Police: Gwent
- Fire: South Wales
- Ambulance: Welsh
- UK Parliament: Monmouth

Earlswood (Welsh: Coed-yr-iarll) is a rural area of scattered settlement in Monmouthshire, south east Wales, United Kingdom. It is located five miles northwest of Chepstow, within the parish of Shirenewton and immediately east of the forested area of Wentwood.

== History ==
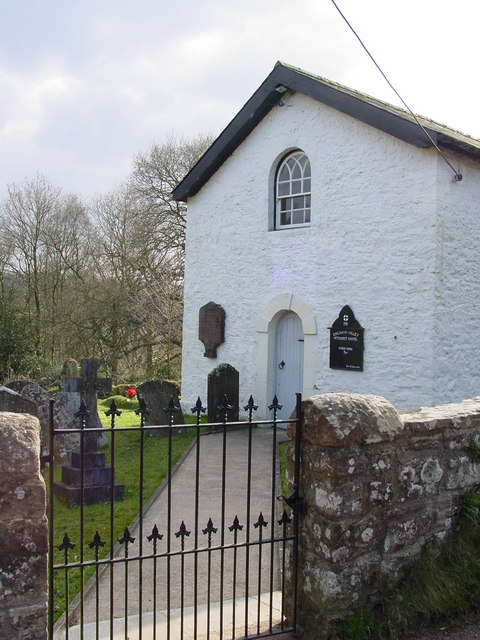
Earlswood Valley Methodist Chapel

Before the Norman invasion of Wales, the area was largely forested. At the time of the Domesday Book it formed part of the estates of Durand, the Sheriff of Gloucester. He and his successors began the process of woodland clearance, and established the village of "Sheriff's Newton", now Shirenewton. Later, in the 12th century, the post of Sheriff was held by Milo Fitzwalter (Miles de Gloucester), who became Earl of Hereford and Lord High Constable of England, and the hilly area north west of Shirenewton became known as the Earl's Wood.

Earlswood Methodist Chapel dates from 1791. Built of rubble stone and Welsh slate, it is largely unaltered, although John Newman, in his Gwent/Monmouthshire volume in the Pevsner Buildings of Wales series, records an extension dating from 1908.

A school was built in the area in 1861 for a maximum of 80 students. The former school house is now let as a holiday cottage.

== The village today ==
Today the village has a large community building built with publicly donated money, as a memorial to members of the parish who were killed in World War II. The building hosts many events for the parish.
