= Llancayo =

Village in Monmouthshire, Wales

Coordinates: 51°43′N 2°55′W

Llancayo: Welsh: Llancaeo
- Village
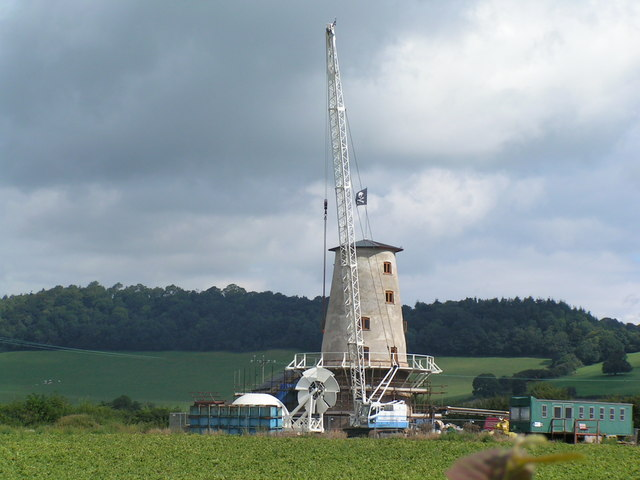
- Llancayo Mill in course of restoration, 2008

- Location within Monmouthshire
- Principal area: Monmouthshire
- Country: Wales
- Sovereign state: United Kingdom
- Police: Gwent
- Fire: South Wales
- Ambulance: Welsh

Llancayo (Welsh: Llancaeo) is a village in Monmouthshire, south-east Wales. It is located two miles north of Usk on the B4598 road to Abergavenny, in the community of Llanarth.

== History and amenities ==
Llancayo Mill is situated in fields visible from the road. It was built around 1813 and destroyed by fire by about 1830. The local story is that the miller left the mill gears engaged when he went to market, and when the wind changed direction the mechanism overheated, igniting the surrounding timber. A Monmouthshire poet, Myfanwy Haycock, wrote a poem about the now disused windmill. It has now been fully restored, with working sails, for use as a "luxury retreat".

The River Usk flows close by.
