= The Larches, Monmouthshire =

Coed y Mynydd (The Larches)
- Location within Monmouthshire

General information
- Architectural style: Iron Age hill fort
- Location: Trelech, Wales
- Coordinates: 51.61°N 2.82°W

The Larches (Welsh: Bryngaer Coed y Mynydd) near Trellech is a Celtic Iron Age hillfort. OS reference: SO492037.

This fort was registered by Cadw and is identified with the number SAM: MM069. There are approximately 300 hillforts in Cadw's list of monuments, although archaeologists believe there were nearly 600 in total.

== See also ==
List of hill forts in Wales
