= Llanfoist Fawr =

Llanfoist Fawr: Welsh: Llan-ffwyst Fawr
- Community
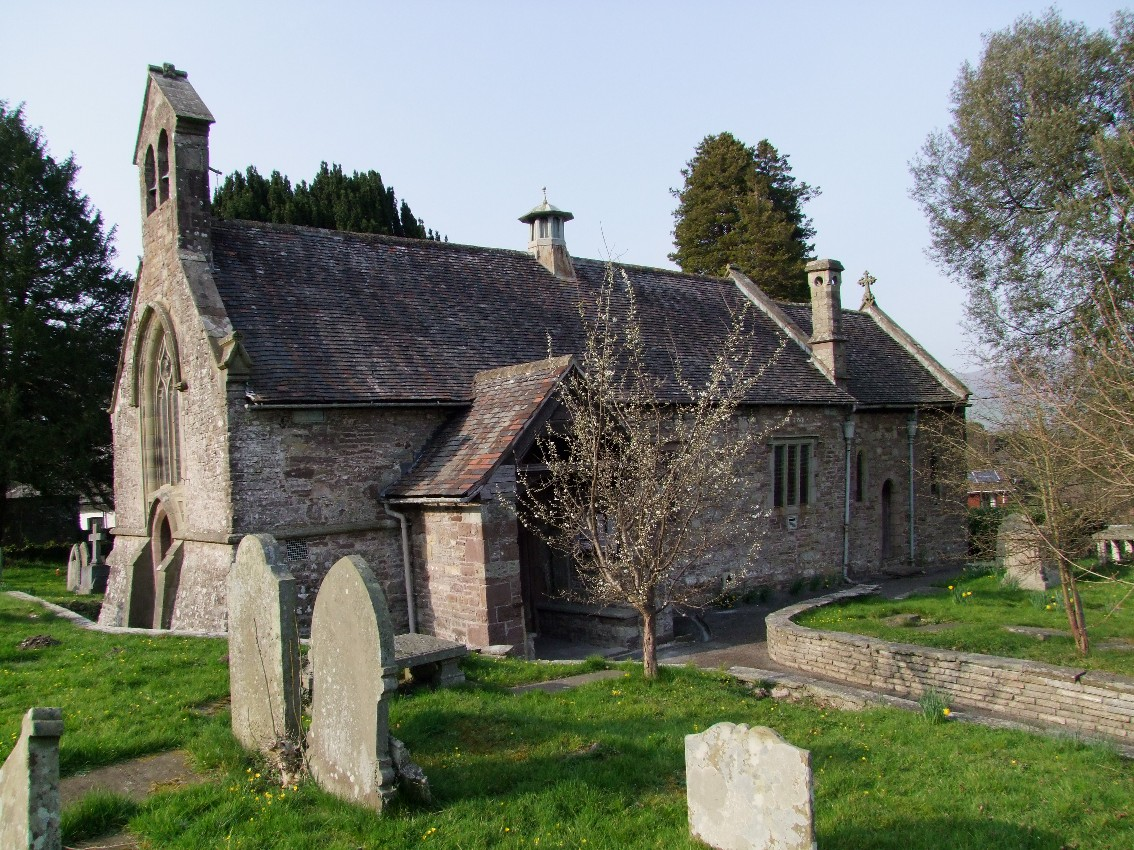

- Location within Monmouthshire
- Population: 3,315 (2011)
- OS grid reference: SO 2895 1327
  - Cardiff: 23.8 mi (38.3 km)
  - London: 126.3 mi (203.3 km)
- Principal area: Monmouthshire
- Country: Wales
- Sovereign state: United Kingdom
- Post town: Abergavenny
- Postcode district: NP7
- Dialling code: 01495
- Police: Gwent
- Fire: South Wales
- Ambulance: Welsh
- List of places UK Wales Monmouthshire 51.813532°N 3.032093°W Map of the community

Llanfoist Fawr (Welsh: Llan-ffwyst Fawr) is a community in the county of Monmouthshire, Wales, and is located 23.8 miles (38.3 km) from Cardiff and 126.3 miles (203.2 km) from London. In 2011 the population of Llanfoist Fawr was 3217 with 10.2% of them able to speak Welsh.

The community includes the villages of Govilon, Llanwenarth, Llanellen and Llanfoist itself. The name of the local school is also Llanfoist Fawr.

Llanfoist Fawr is also the name of a county electoral ward, which elects a county councillor to Monmouthshire County Council. The county ward includes part of the Llanfoist Fawr community, namely the community wards of Llanfoist, Llanellen and Llanwenarth Citra. The Llanwenarth Ultra ward (covering Govilon) elects its own county councillor. All four community wards elect or co-opt up to twelve community councillors to Llanfoist Fawr Community Council.

== See also ==
- List of localities in Wales by population
