= Gwehelog =

Coordinates: 51.7322°N 2.8856°W

- Location within Monmouthshire
- Population: 493 (2011)
- Community: Llanarth
- Principal area: Monmouthshire
- Preserved county: Gwent
- Country: Wales
- Sovereign state: United Kingdom
- Post town: USK
- Postcode district: NP15
- Dialling code: 01291
- Police: Gwent
- Fire: South Wales
- Ambulance: Welsh
- UK Parliament: Monmouth
- Senedd Cymru – Welsh Parliament: Monmouth

Gwehelog is a village settlement in the community of Llanarth, in Monmouthshire, south east Wales.

== Location ==
Gwehelog is located 2 miles (3.2 km) south of the village of Raglan and 2 miles (3.2 km) north of the town of Usk in very rural Monmouthshire.

== History and amenities ==
There is a Methodist chapel nearby, built in 1822, in a Gothic vernacular style. It was modified in 1902. The minister is Rev Ruth Lownsbrough and Sunday services are at 3.00 pm or 4:00 pm. The chapel is also available for community use.

The local pub and restaurant is the Hall Inn. There is also a village hall available for hire.

In May 2020 a man died, another was seriously injured, and a woman sustained leg injuries after an attack by a water buffalo kept at a farm near Gwehelog. The animal was later destroyed.

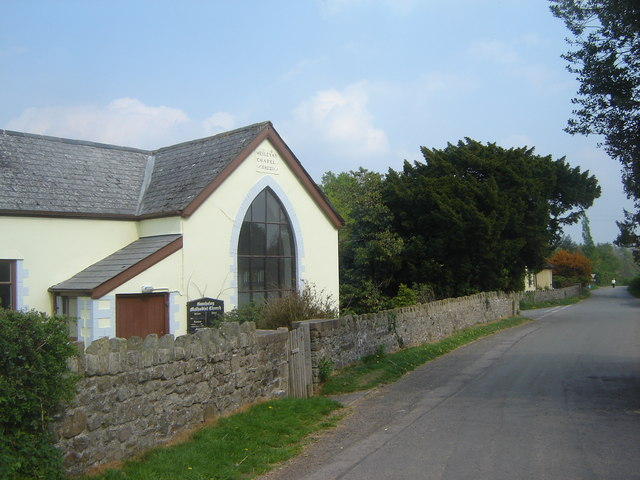
Methodist Chapel

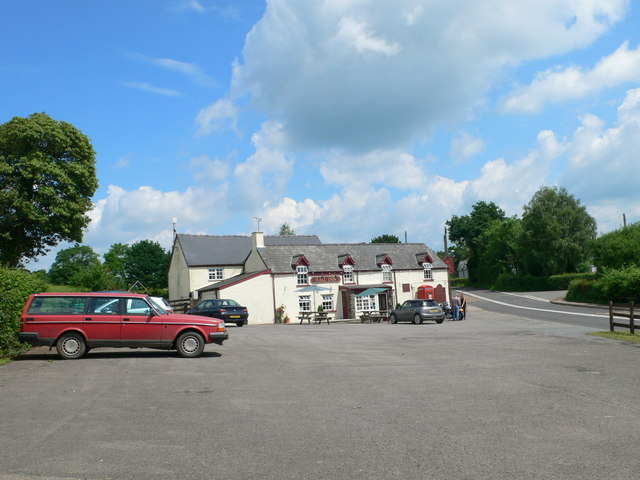
Hall Inn
