= St Brides Netherwent =

Village in Monmouthshire, Wales

Coordinates: 51.60143°N 2.82583°W

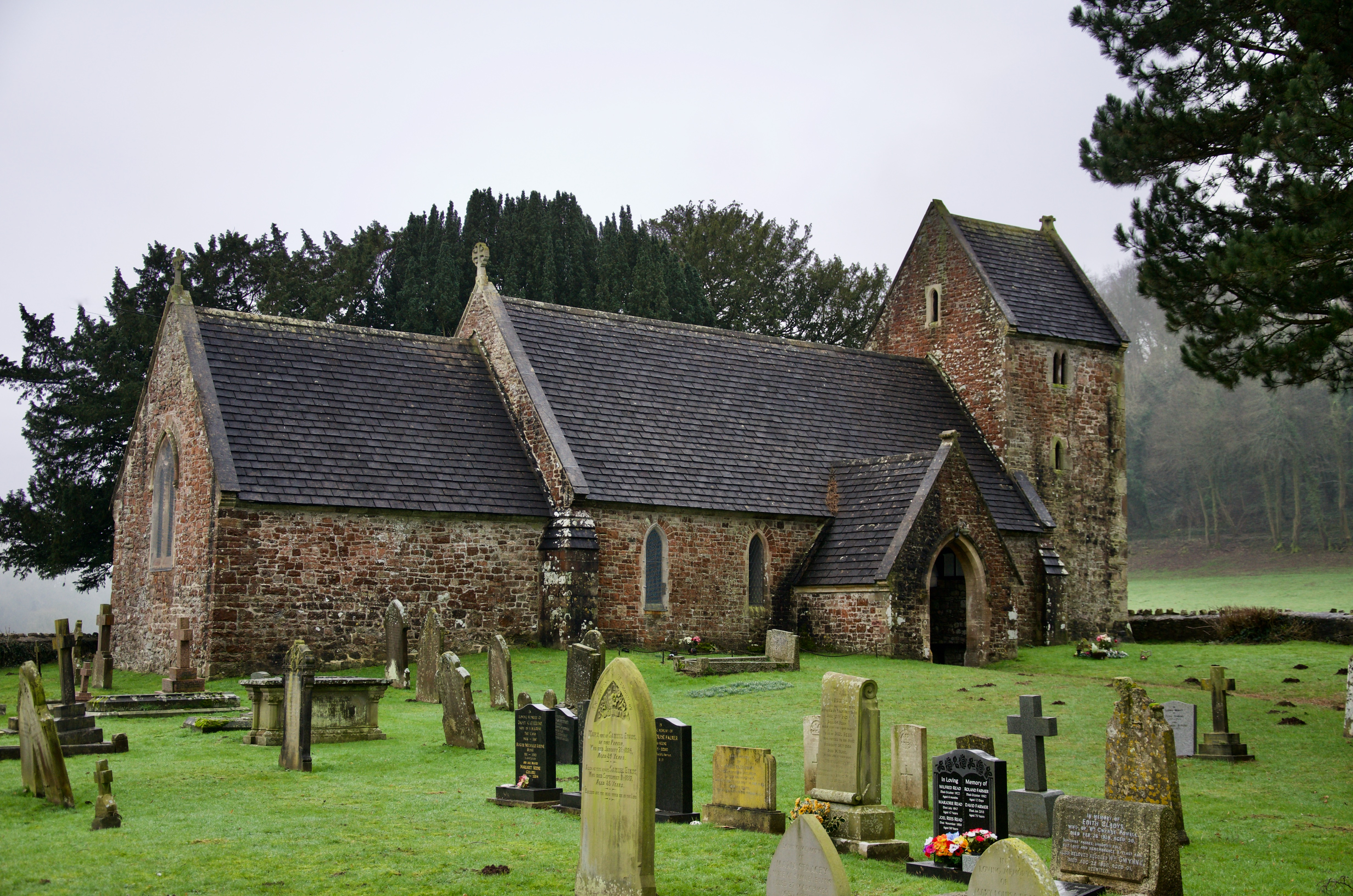
The church of St Bridget (or Brigid)

St Brides Netherwent (Welsh: Sant-y-brid) is a parish and largely deserted village in Monmouthshire, south-east Wales. It is centred 2 miles north of Magor, and 3 miles west of Caerwent. The A48 Newport to Chepstow road passes close by to the north.

== History ==
The church of Saint Bridget or Brigid is set in quiet countryside, adjoining the site of a deserted medieval village. It was traditionally founded by Brochwael, the son of Meurig of Gwent, in the 10th century. The church tower dates from the 13th or 14th century, but the body of the church was rebuilt in the 19th century after it became dilapidated. Hung in the tower is one of the oldest inscribed bells in the country, cast in 1290, 22 inches in diameter and slightly oval in shape. It is inscribed "AVE MARIA GRATIA PLN" and is still in use today.

The parish was part of the medieval lordship of Striguil. It is so named to distinguish it from the village of St Brides Wentloog, to the west of Newport. "Netherwent" is the English name given from the Norman period onwards to the Welsh cantref of Gwent-is-coed (Gwent beneath the wood, i.e. Wentwood), with "-went" deriving from the Roman town of Venta which became Caerwent.

Aside from today's farmhouses outlying the clustered centre, St Brides Netherwent was abandoned in the 18th century.

== Local schools ==
Both Magor Church in Wales Primary School and Undy Primary School are within catchment of the area. Caldicot School is the local secondary school within the catchment area.
