= Llanhennock =

Village in Monmouthshire, Wales, UK

Coordinates: 51°37′48″N 2°56′11″W

Llanhennock (Welsh: Llanhenwg) is a village and former community, now in the community of Llangybi, in Monmouthshire, south east Wales, United Kingdom. The population taken at the 2011 census was 496. The village of Tredunnock was within the community. In 2022 the community was abolished and merged with Llangybi.

== Location ==
Llanhennock is located two miles north east of Caerleon and five miles south west of Usk.

== History and amenities ==
Llanhennock is situated not far from the River Usk and is also close to Cwmbran .
