= Llanfoist =

Village in Monmouthshire, Wales

Coordinates: 51.81107°N 3.03563°W

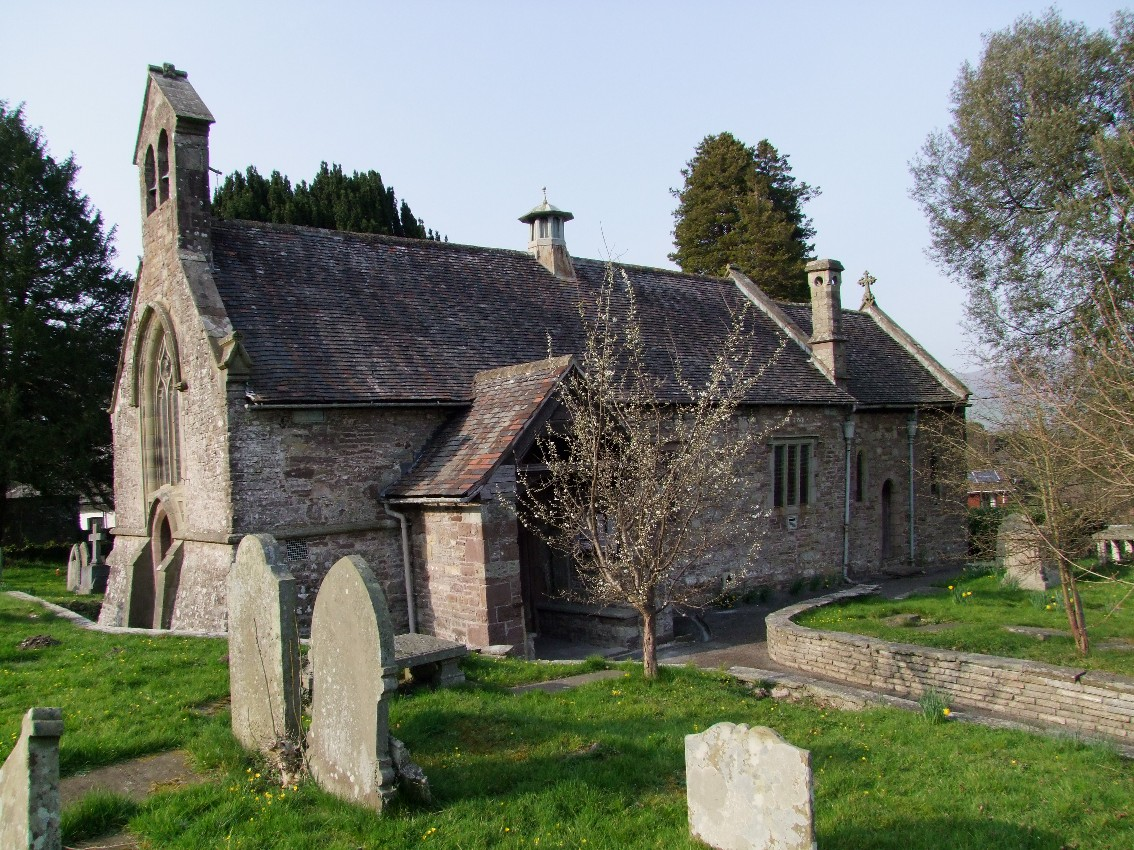
The Church of St Faith

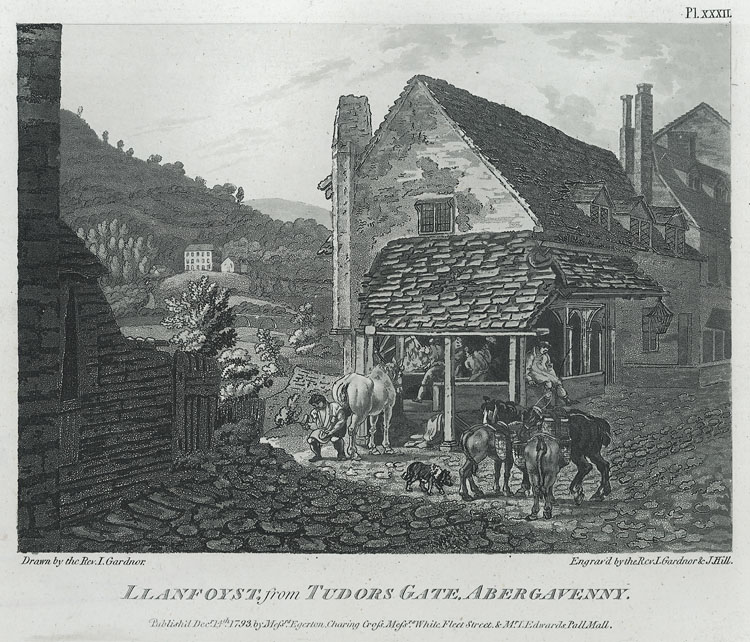
Llanfoist from Tudor's Gate, John Gardnor (1729-1808)

Llanfoist (Welsh: Llan-ffwyst) is a village near Abergavenny, in Monmouthshire, Wales, in the community of Llanfoist Fawr. The saint after whom the church and village was named is uncertain. The anglicised version of the church patron is Saint Faith. The population was 1,228 in 2011.

== The Church of St Faith ==
1901 Kelly's Directory of Monmouthshire describes the parish church of St Faith's:

".. an ancient building of small dimensions, in the Gothic style, consisting of chancel, nave, south porch and a western bell gable with two bells" adding "The windows are stained; one on the south side, of three lights, was placed by Mrs. Wheeley in memory of her father. The east window and two small ones in the chancel were erected by the neighbouring gentry to the memory of Crawshay Bailey esq., the great ironmaster of Nant-y-glo, who is buried here. A three-light window on the north side was given by his tenantry as a memorial to the same. The chancel was restored in 1877 by Crawshay Bailey esq., son of the above, and since, deceased. There are 80 sittings. In the churchyard are two ancient yew trees, and an ancient stone cross."

The church holds records for baptisms from 1736–1975, for marriages from 1736–1971, for banns from 1824–47 and 1890–1933, and for burials from 1736-1945. There are also Bishops Transcripts for 1725-32, 1734–51, 1753-4, 1756–75, 1777–1806, 1808–10, 1813, 1815–16, 1820–37, 1841–58, 1862–1865, 1869 and 1880.

The parish of Llanelen has historically been held with Llanfoist, although since the retirement of the last resident Rector, the Reverend Thomas Arthur Foster (1923-2010) in 1992 the parishes have been served from Govilon (Llanwenarth Ultra). At the time of his departure, Father Foster was the longest serving incumbent in the Diocese of Monmouth, having held the benefice since 1959. His predecessor, the Reverend Harold Stanley Richards (1888-1976) served between 1930-59. In January 2012 an ancient yew tree in the grounds of St Faith's Church, which was believed to be up to 1,000 years old, was brought down by high winds.

The village also had a Wesleyan Methodist Chapel, erected in 1839. In 1851 the attendance was 200 for morning worship (with 180 scholars), 200 scholars in the afternoon and 40 for evening worship with 50 scholars.

== Crawshay Bailey and Alexander Cordell ==
Llanfoist was home to ironmaster Crawshay Bailey. Before 1851 he had retired to Llanfoist House in the village. Llanfoist Primary School had a house named after him until 2008 when the House was renamed 'Skirrid'. He died in 1872, aged 83, after at least seventy years in industry. His only son and heir, also Crawshay Bailey (1841–1887), inherited his estate.

The novelist Alexander Cordell, most famously author of Rape of the Fair Country is buried at Llanfoist.

== Amenities and attractions ==
The village is located beneath the hill known as Blorenge, part of the Brecon Beacons National Park, rising 1,838 feet (560 m) above sea level over the vale of the River Usk. The Monmouthshire and Brecon Canal runs just above the village.

The village has a church hall, situated on the Merthyr Road. The Llanfoist Fawr Primary School moved to a new location in the Barratt estate (Ffordd yr Ysgol) on Gypsy Lane and was opened in 2008.

=== Llanfoist cemetery ===
Llanfoist Cemetery (also known as New Cemetery), stands on the south bank of the River Usk at the northern edge of Llanfoist. Opened in 1894, its Royal Commission on the Ancient and Historical Monuments of Wales registration describes it as a "good example of a well-preserved Victorian landscaped garden cemetery". The cemetery is listed at Grade II on the Register of Parks and Gardens of Special Historic Interest in Wales.
