= St Arvans =

Village in Monmouthshire, Wales

St Arvans: Welsh: Llanarfan
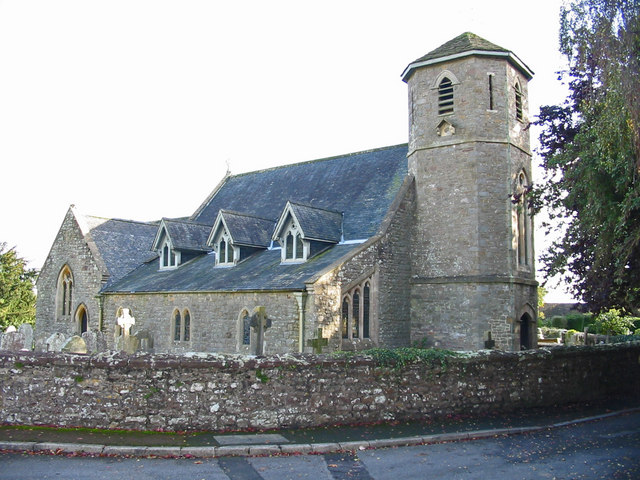
- St Arvans parish church

- Location within Monmouthshire
- Population: 765 (2011)
- OS grid reference: ST516965
- Principal area: Monmouthshire
- Preserved county: Gwent
- Country: Wales
- Sovereign state: United Kingdom
- Post town: CHEPSTOW
- Postcode district: NP16
- Dialling code: 01291
- Police: Gwent
- Fire: South Wales
- Ambulance: Welsh
- UK Parliament: Monmouth
- Senedd Cymru – Welsh Parliament: Monmouth
- List of places UK Wales Monmouthshire 51.666°N 2.700°W Map of the community

St Arvans (Welsh: Llanarfan) is a village and community (equivalent to a parish) in Monmouthshire, south-east Wales. It is located two miles north west of Chepstow, close to Chepstow Racecourse, Piercefield House and the Wye Valley AONB. It is connected by a segregated bicycle path to the edge of Chepstow.

== Name ==
The name "Sain Arfan" was incorrectly placed on signage provided by Monmouthshire county council, sometime between 2005 and 2010, as a Welsh language version of St Arvans. This translation was never approved by the St Arvans community council or the Welsh speakers within the village itself. It took over 10 years before the signage was corrected to match the fountain stone tablet, and the historically used "Llanarfan" (Welsh translation for the Parish of St Arvans) in 2022.

== History and amenities ==
=== Church of St Arvan ===
The village church is dedicated to Saint Arvan. According to tradition he was a 9th-century hermit who supported himself by fishing for salmon in the River Wye, and drowned when his coracle capsized. The circular nature of the churchyard suggests that the church may be a Celtic foundation. There are remains of a Celtic cross of the period, and also part of an apparently Saxon doorway, but essentially the original church was late Norman in date. By 1254 it belonged to the small priory of St Kingsmark or Cynmarch. It was enlarged between 1813 and 1823, and extensive restoration work was carried out in the 1880s and again in the 1980s. The octagonal tower was the gift of the local property-owner Nathaniel Wells. The church is a Grade II listed building.

=== Other ===
The village has a large village hall, the Memorial Hall, opened in 1924. There is also a cast iron drinking fountain constructed in 1893. The centre of the village is designated as a Conservation Area.

The cave systems in the area are a strong attraction to cavers and potholers.

To the north of the village is Wyndcliffe Court, a Grade II* listed house and gardens in the Arts and Crafts style. The ruined Piercefield House, about a mile to the South, is also listed at Grade II*.

== Governance ==
An electoral ward in the same name exists. This ward stretches north from St Arvans to Tintern. The total ward population taken at the 2011 census was 1,618.
