= Whitebrook =

Coordinates: 51.755242°N 2.675914°W

Whitebrook: Welsh: Abergwenffrwd
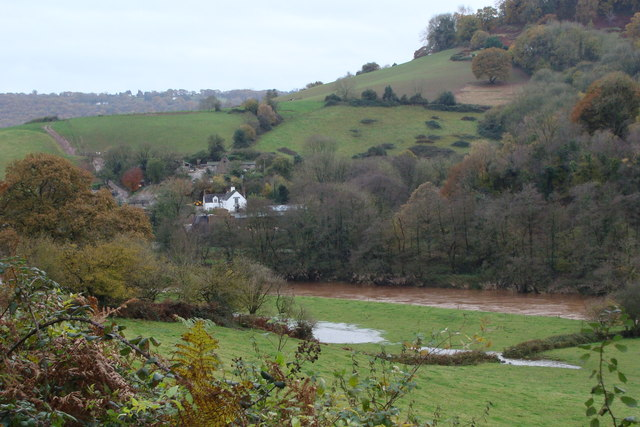
- Whitebrook valley and the River Wye

- Location within Monmouthshire
- OS grid reference: SO533065
- Community: Trellech United
- Principal area: Monmouthshire
- Preserved county: Gwent
- Country: Wales
- Sovereign state: United Kingdom
- Post town: MONMOUTH
- Postcode district: NP25
- Dialling code: 01600
- Police: Gwent
- Fire: South Wales
- Ambulance: Welsh

Whitebrook (Welsh: Abergwenffrwd) is a small village in Monmouthshire, south-east Wales, United Kingdom. It is located four miles south east of Monmouth in the Wye Valley.

== History and amenities ==
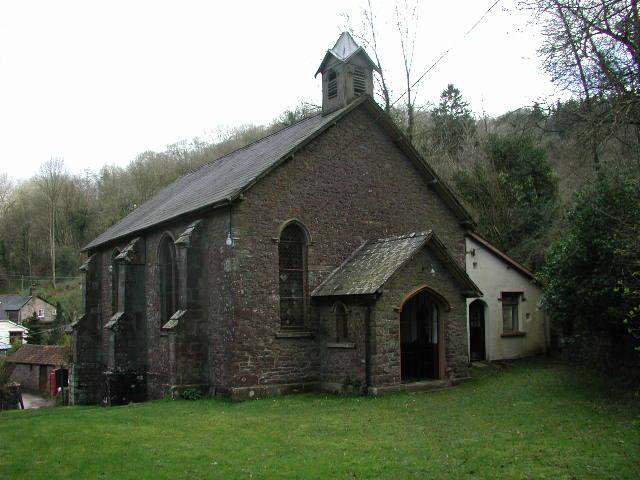
Holy Trinity Church

Between the 17th and 19th centuries, the Whitebrook valley - like the Angiddy valley at Tintern a few miles to the south - was a centre of intensive water-powered industry. A branch of Tintern wireworks was established here in about 1606, and wire working continued to be the main industry of the valley until about 1720. By about 1760, paper mills had taken over, and much of the housing in the valley was built for millworkers around that time. Some of the paper was made from imported esparto grass, brought in via the quay at nearby Llandogo.

Although the industry had ceased by 1880, the valley retains the remains of several old mills, warehouses, dams and leats. These include the remains of a quay and warehouses beside the Wye; remains of a mill and dam belonging to the Glynn Paper Mill which operated between about 1800 and 1850; more extensive sandstone-built remains upstream of Bridget's Mills; the remains of two 17th-century wireworks mills; the remains of the large Clearwater Paper Mills built about 1760, with its accompanying water systems; and several more mills. Fernside Mill, to the west, is the only mill in the valley to remain largely intact; it comprises a four-storey seven-bay stone-built paper mill building, together with a two-storey manager's house and a stable. Many of the valley's mill buildings have now been transformed into desirable residential properties. The village is designated as a Conservation Area.

The Holy Trinity Church was built as a result of public subscription in 1835, to cater for the industrial community. It has an intricately carved screen, made by Rev. Joshua Stansfield in 1892.

Whitebrook today is known for its fine dining restaurant, The Crown at Whitebrook, with owner and chef Chris Harrod. The River Wye AONB surrounds the village, with Lower Hael Wood to the north. Across the river are the hills of west Gloucestershire and the Forest of Dean through which Offa's Dyke Path passes.

== Notable residents ==
Novelist Julia Gregson lives in the village, which was also the home for some years of Gwydion Thomas, son of poet R. S. Thomas. The poet Paul Groves (born 1947) spent his childhood a mile to the south at The Narth.

== Railways ==
The Wye Valley Railway went through the village between Monmouth Troy railway station and Chepstow railway station from 1876. Served by Whitebrook Halt railway station which was a request stop on the former Wye Valley Railway. It was built in 1927 to serve the village of Whitebrook and opened in February that year. It was closed in 1959 when passenger services were withdrawn from the Wye Valley Railway. The station came too late to make full use out of the village's industry. Whitebrook had once been home to three paper mills. However, paper making ceased in Whitebrook in the early 1880s, only four years after the line opened in 1876. The halt was not built until long after the closure of the paper mills.
