= Wild Hare Inn, Tintern =

Hotel in Tintern, Monmouthshire, Wales

The Royal George
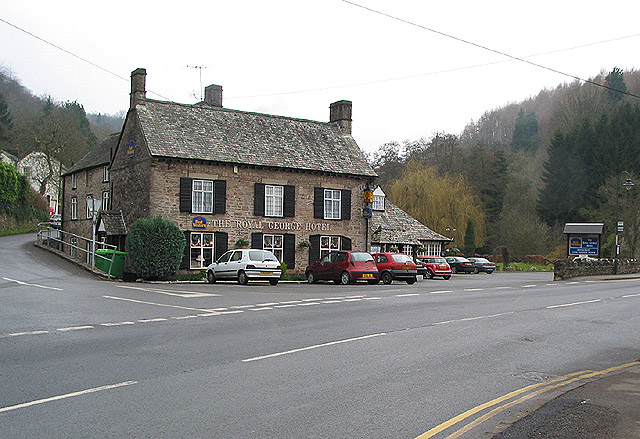

- Location in Monmouthshire

General information
- Location: Tintern, Chepstow, Monmouthshire, Wales
- Coordinates: 51°41′52″N 2°40′56″W

Other information
- Number of rooms: 14

The Royal George, formerly The Wild Hare, is a hotel in Tintern located 5 miles (8.0 km) to the north of Chepstow, Monmouthshire, Wales. It is situated beside the A466 road, across the road from the River Wye, on the corner of an unclassified road to Devauden and Trellech. It is a Grade II listed building.

The building dates from the 17th century, when it was the house of one of the ironmasters responsible for developing the wire works, in the nearby Angiddy valley, owned by the Company of Mineral and Battery Works. It later became an inn, and developed as a coaching inn after the new road along the Wye valley was built in the 1820s. It was known as the "Royal George" by 1835, though it is unclear which of the kings it is named after. By 1899 it was advertised as "an old established well-placed hotel... admirably situate...[and] of pleasing elevation, with flower garden in front".

By 1939, it had been taken over by Trust Houses Ltd., later part of the Forte Group. Managed during the late 1970's by Gary and Marily Hayward. Subsequently run by Best Western the pub now operates independently as the Wild Hare. Completely renovated, The Royal George is now part of Greyheath Hospitality portfolio.
