= Stuart Wilson =

Stuart Wilson may refer to:

- Stuart Wilson (actor) (born 1946), English actor
- Stuart Wilson (footballer) (born 1977), English football midfielder
- Stuart Wilson (archaeologist) (born 1979), English archaeologist
- Stuart Wilson (Big Brother) (born 1984), contestant in Big Brother UK
- Stuart Wilson (golfer) (born 1977), Scottish golfer
- Stuart Wilson (sound engineer) (active since 2006), Scottish sound engineer
- Stuart Wilson (rower) (born 1954), lightweight rower who has competed for Great Britain and Australia
- Stuart Wilson (musician) (active since 2012), musician from the Cayman Islands

== See also ==
- Stu Wilson (1954–2025), New Zealand rugby union player
- Stu Wilson (American football) (1905–1963), American football player
- Stewart Wilson (born 1942), Scottish rugby union player
- Stewart Murray Wilson (1946–2021), New Zealand sexual offender
