= Pant-glas Farmhouse, Llanishen, Monmouthshire =

Pant-glas Farmhouse
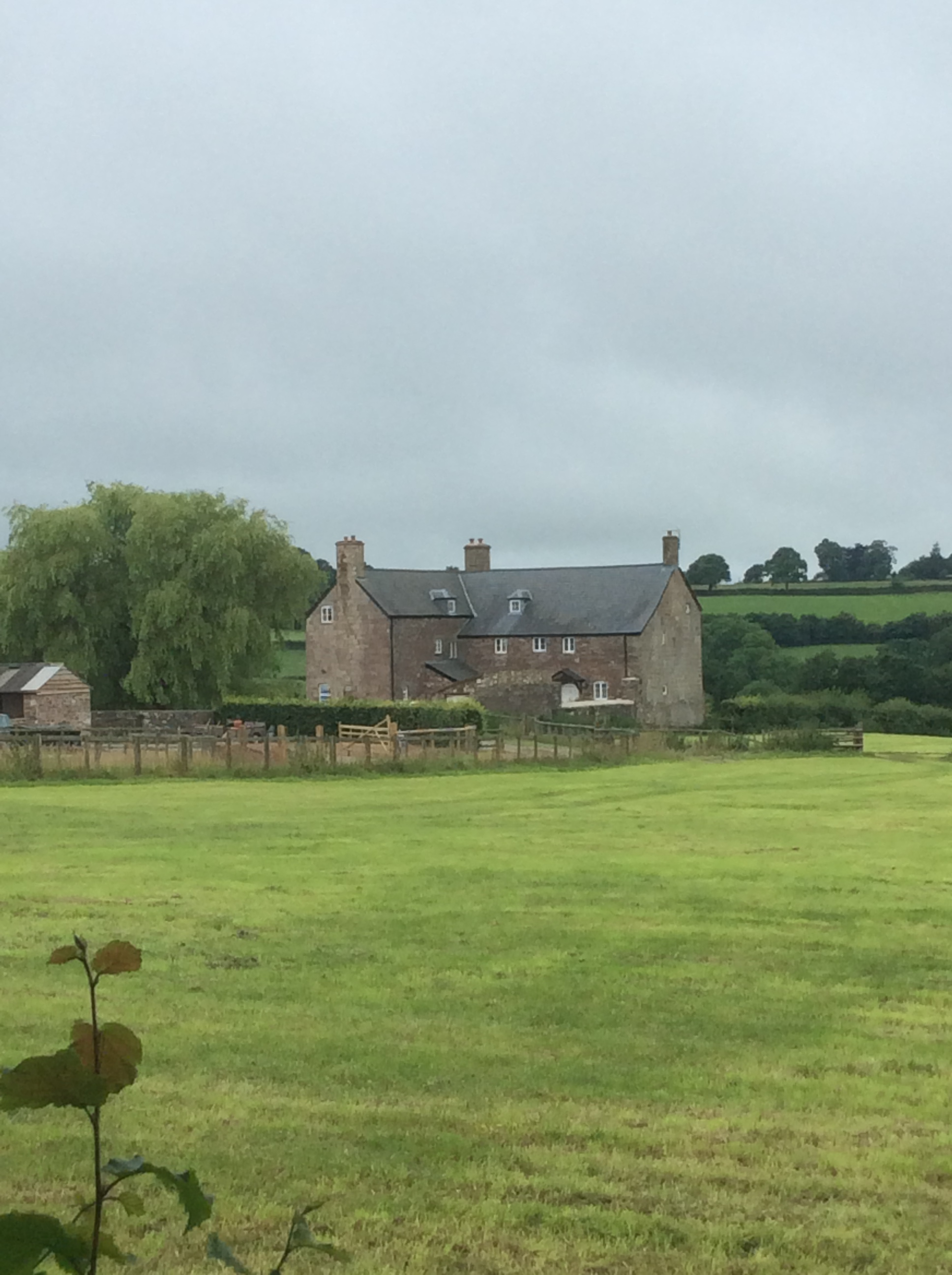
- "a fascinating puzzle"

- Location within Monmouthshire
- 51.7333°N 2.7524°W
- Type: Farmhouse and barn
- Location: Llanishen, Monmouthshire, Wales

History
- Built: circa 16th century

Site notes
- Architectural style: Vernacular
- Governing body: Privately owned

Listed Building – Grade II*
- Official name: Pant-glas Farmhouse
- Designated: 19 November 1953
- Reference no.: 2103

Listed Building – Grade II*
- Official name: Barn at Pant-glas Farm
- Designated: 28 February 2001
- Reference no.: 24939

Pant-glas Farmhouse and its associated barn at Llanishen, Trellech, Monmouthshire date from the early 16th and 17th centuries respectively and are both Grade II* listed buildings.

== History and description ==
The Monmouthshire antiquarian Sir Joseph Bradney records Pant-glas as the historic home of the Probert family, landowners and High Sheriffs of Monmouthshire. The earliest datable elements of the house are the cellars, from the late 15th or early 16th century. The existing main block of the house is from the early 17th century, while the barn is thought to have been built later in that century. Although of a construction date of 1590 to 1620, the house uses much material of earlier dates, including medieval stonework and an Elizabethan doorcase and the architectural historian John Newman notes the suggestion that some of the masonry came from Raglan Castle, 4 mi (6.4 km) to the west of Pant-glas. The complex building history leads Newman to call the house a "fascinating puzzle" and Cadw notes its construction is open to "several possible interpretations".

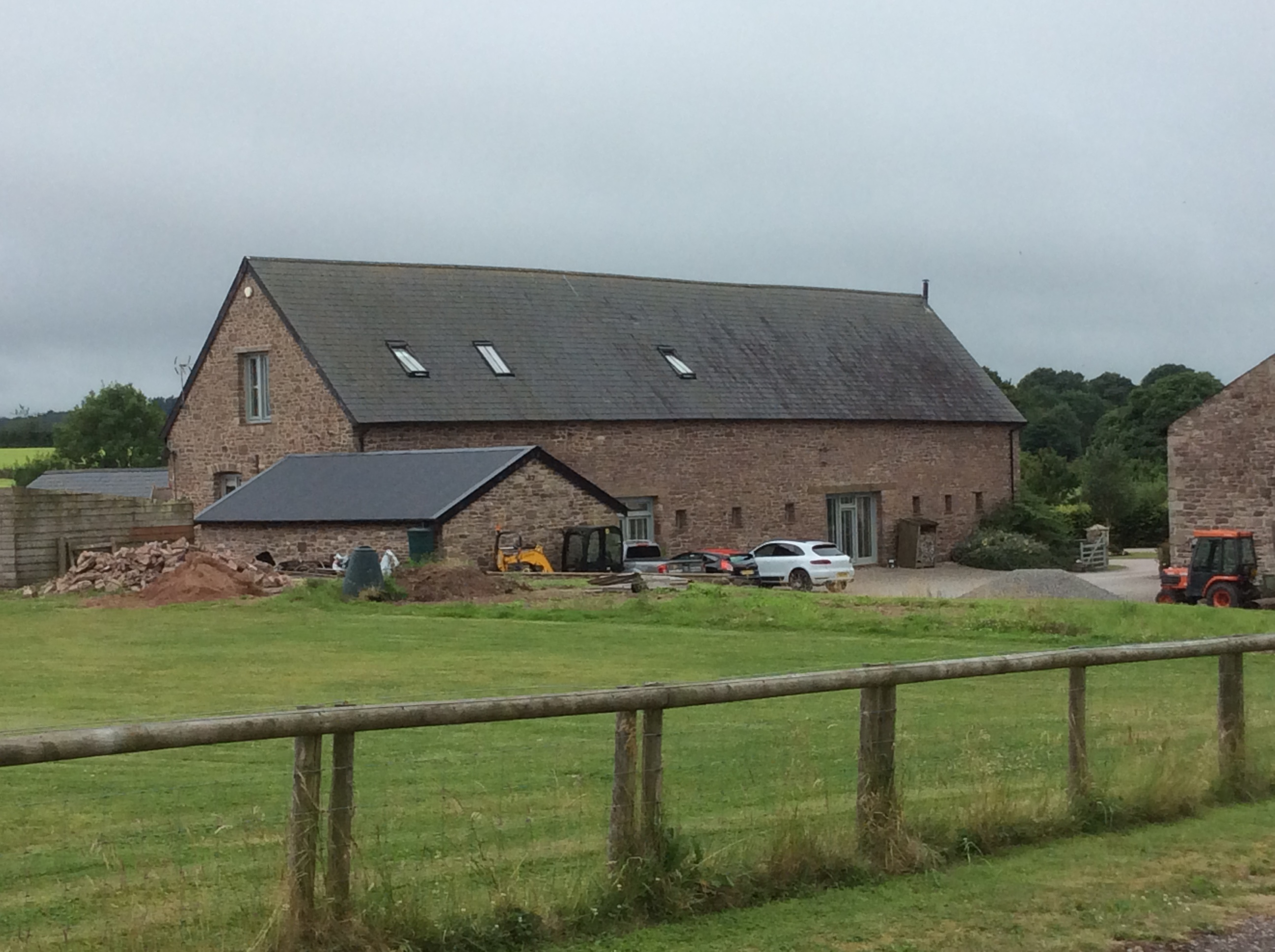
The barn at Pant-glas

From the mid-17th century the house was let, the Proberts having built a new mansion, The Argoed at Penallt. The barn is most likely of this date, although it could be slightly earlier. The farmhouse and barn remain private residences.

The house is tall and constructed of "well-cut" old red sandstone. It is on a L-plan. The entrance front was re-designed in the 18th century, to give what Cadw describes as a Georgian appearance. The pediment carries a date of 1752 (Newman) or 1732 (Cadw). The roof has a steep pitch and is of concrete and Welsh slate tiles, with dormer windows dating from the 1970s. The interior has been extensively remodelled but still contains some early features including a late-medieval fireplace.

The barn is "unusually large" and mostly unaltered, except for the roof skylights. The house and the barn have separate Grade II* listed building designations.
