= The Narth =

Coordinates: 51.754715°N 2.689623°W

The Narth: Welsh: Pennarth
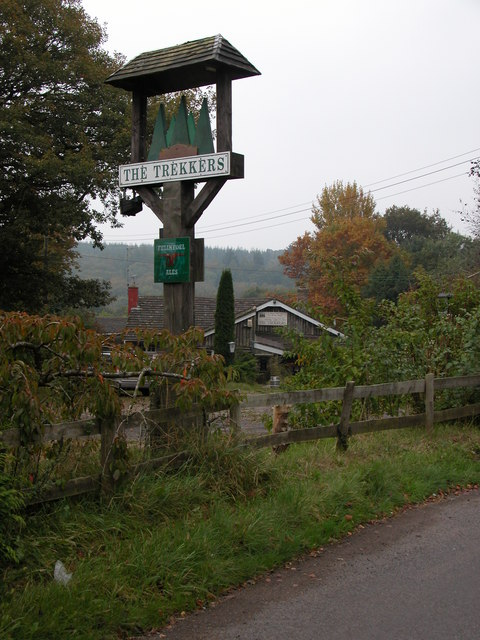
- Sign at the former Trekkers centre, The Narth, photographed in 2006

- Location within Monmouthshire
- OS grid reference: SO525065
- Community: Trellech United
- Principal area: Monmouthshire
- Preserved county: Gwent
- Country: Wales
- Sovereign state: United Kingdom
- Post town: MONMOUTH
- Postcode district: NP25
- Dialling code: 01600
- Police: Gwent
- Fire: South Wales
- Ambulance: Welsh
- UK Parliament: Monmouth

The Narth (Welsh: Pennarth) is a village in Monmouthshire, Wales. It is located about 6 miles (9.7 km) south of Monmouth, and about 2 miles (3.2 km) east of Trellech, on a spur of land overlooking the Whitebrook and Wye valleys. The population as of the 2011 census was 369.

== History and amenities ==
The village developed initially through settlement on waste land, principally by workers in paper mills in Whitebrook in the nineteenth century. In the 1920s, land was offered for sale by the owner, the Marquis of Worcester, and development continued on a sporadic basis until the late twentieth century. Old cottages were refurbished and many larger houses were built. The village is popular with commuters.

A village school opened in 1910, but closed later in the century. The Trekkers opened in the early 1970s as a trekking centre, and operated as a private members' club until 1984; thereafter it was run as a pub, housed in a log cabin, until it closed in 2004. It has since been demolished. Community activity is centred on the village hall.

The village was largely developed in the 1950s when council houses were built. They are now no longer run by the council, however.

There is a map of the village in the phone box.
