= Catbrook =

Village in Monmouthshire, Wales

Coordinates: 51.72088°N 2.70929°W

Catbrook: Welsh: Catffrwd
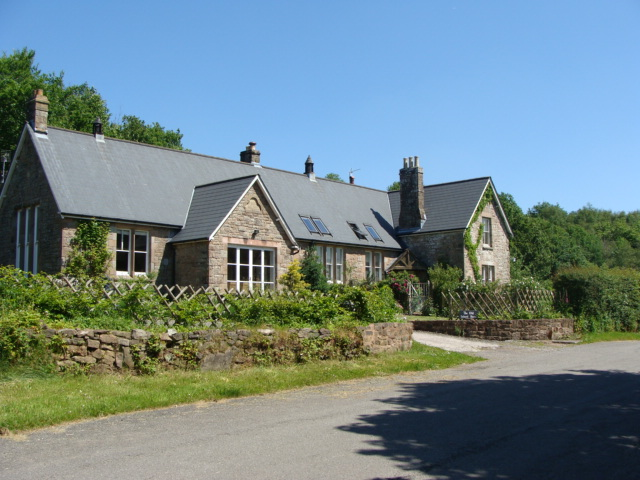
- Old Catbrook schoolhouse

- Location within Monmouthshire
- OS grid reference: SO511027
- Principal area: Monmouthshire
- Preserved county: Gwent
- Country: Wales
- Sovereign state: United Kingdom
- Post town: USK
- Postcode district: NP
- Police: Gwent
- Fire: South Wales
- Ambulance: Welsh
- UK Parliament: Monmouth

Catbrook (Welsh: Catffrwd) is a village in Monmouthshire, south east Wales, United Kingdom. The population in 2011 was 412.

== Location ==
Catbrook is 6 miles (9.7 km) south of Monmouth and 1 mile (1.6 km) north west of Tintern. It is in the community of Trellech United, just under two miles south of Trellech village.

== History and amenities ==
Catbrook is set high above Tintern Abbey and the Wye Valley AONB and overlooks the Forest of Dean across the river in Gloucestershire.

The Spice Girls' Melanie Chisholm moved to Catbrook in 2004.

Catbrook & District Memorial Hall was originally an American World War I military hospital in London. The timber-framed building was transported to Catbrook and rebuilt. The building is still maintained by volunteers.
