= Llanishen, Monmouthshire =

Coordinates: 51.72497°N 2.75768°W

Llanishen: Welsh: Llanisien
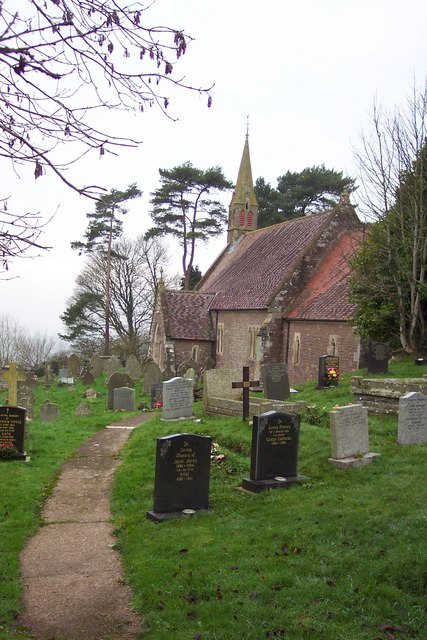
- Llanishen parish church

- Location within Monmouthshire
- OS grid reference: SO476032
- Community: Trellech United
- Principal area: Monmouthshire
- Preserved county: Gwent
- Country: Wales
- Sovereign state: United Kingdom
- Post town: CHEPSTOW
- Postcode district: NP16
- Dialling code: 01600
- Police: Gwent
- Fire: South Wales
- Ambulance: Welsh
- UK Parliament: Monmouth

Llanishen (Welsh: Llanisien) is a village in Monmouthshire, southeast Wales, United Kingdom. It is located 7 miles (11 km) southwest of Monmouth and 3 miles (4.8 km) south of Trellech on the B4293 road, although the main part of the village is set immediately to the west of the road, overlooking the Vale of Usk.

== History and amenities ==
The village takes its name from the original dedication of the parish church to St. Isan or Issien, who was said to have been a follower of the 6th century Celtic St. Illtyd. The church is mentioned in the 12th century Book of Llandaff.

The existing church is dedicated to St. Dennis. It was completely rebuilt in 1852–54 and no evidence of an earlier church remains. Pant-glas Farmhouse and its barn are situated to the north of the church, and both have Grade II* listed building status.

The village is set within what is termed the Wye Valley Forest Park, the upland area within the River Wye AONB.

Llanishen has a public house, the Carpenter's Arms, which dates from 1700.

The village has a village hall which serves the three parishes of Llanishen, Llanfihangel-Tor-Y-Mynydd and Trellech Grange.
