= Church of St Nicholas, Trellech =

Coordinates: 51.7459°N 2.725°W

Church of St Nicholas, Trellech, Monmouthshire
- Church of St Nicholas
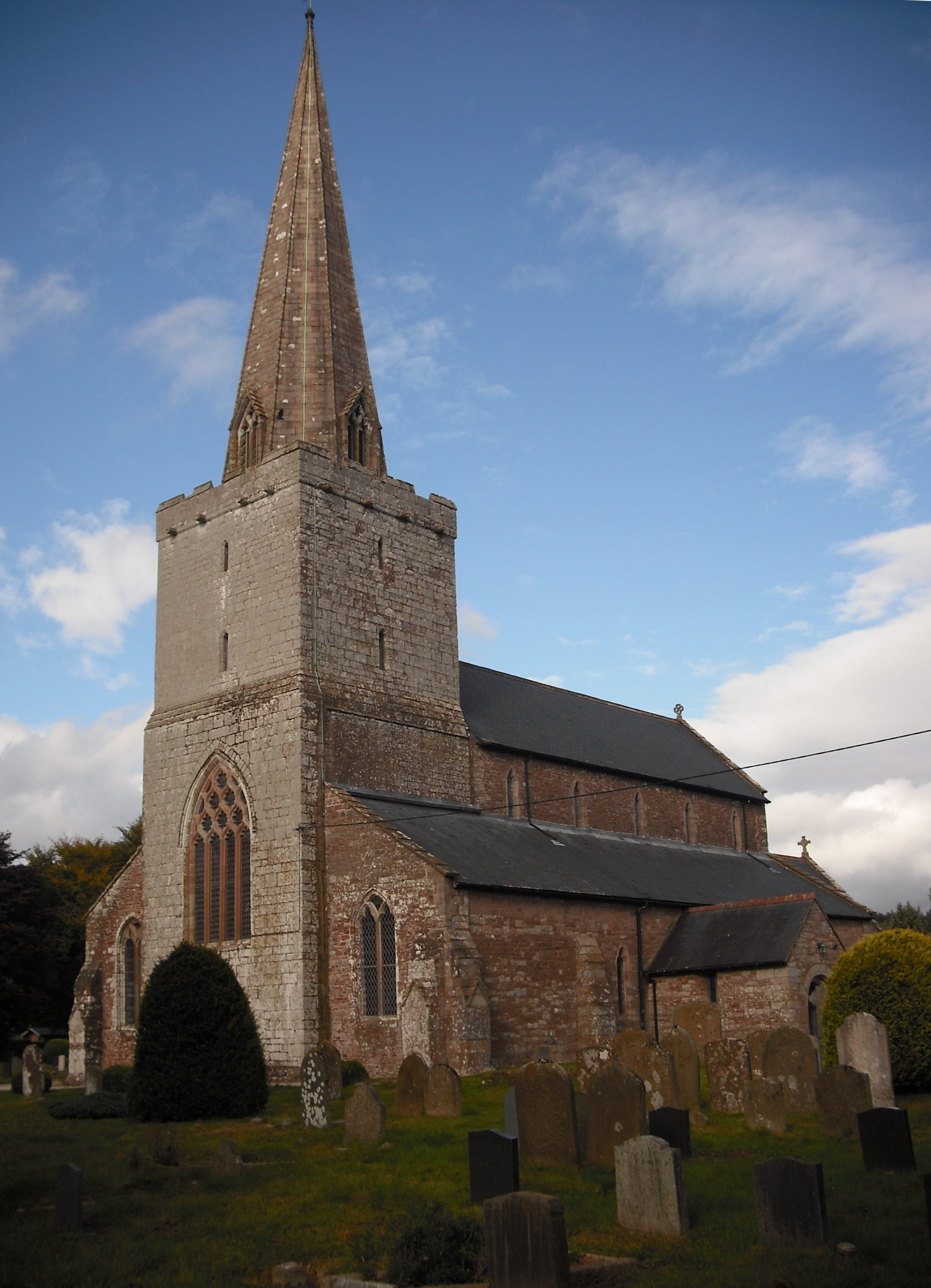
- "One of the finest churches in the county"

- Location in Monmouthshire
- Location: Trellech, Monmouthshire
- Country: Wales
- Denomination: Church in Wales

History
- Status: Parish church
- Founded: c.14th century

Architecture
- Functional status: Active
- Heritage designation: Grade I
- Designated: 19 November 1953
- Architectural type: Church
- Style: Decorated

Administration
- Diocese: Monmouth
- Archdeaconry: Monmouth
- Deanery: Monmouth
- Parish: Trellech and Penallt

Clergy
- Vicar: The Reverend S J Howells

The Church of St Nicholas, Trellech, Monmouthshire is a parish church with its origins in the 14th century. The historical and architectural evidence suggests that it was constructed largely in a single building period c.1300. The style is Decorated Gothic. The church was extended and repaired in the 18th century, and underwent two major reconstructions in 1893 and 1992. An "exceptionally fine and well preserved medieval church", it is a Grade I listed building. It remains an active parish church in the parish of Trellech and Penallt.

== History ==
The structural, and historical evidence suggests that the church was built in a single period at the start of the 14th century. The writer Simon Jenkins suggests the building was a re-building, following a fire in 1296 which destroyed the original church. The priest's door near the porch appears somewhat earlier than 1300, but the architectural historian John Newman suggests that this "cannot be taken as evidence of Norman fabric". The tower may be of the same period, or somewhat later. It has certainly been rebuilt subsequently, records suggesting it collapsed in a storm. The weathercock is dated 1792. The church was extensively restored in 1893 and again in 1992. It remains an active parish church dedicated to Saint Nicholas.

== Architecture and description ==
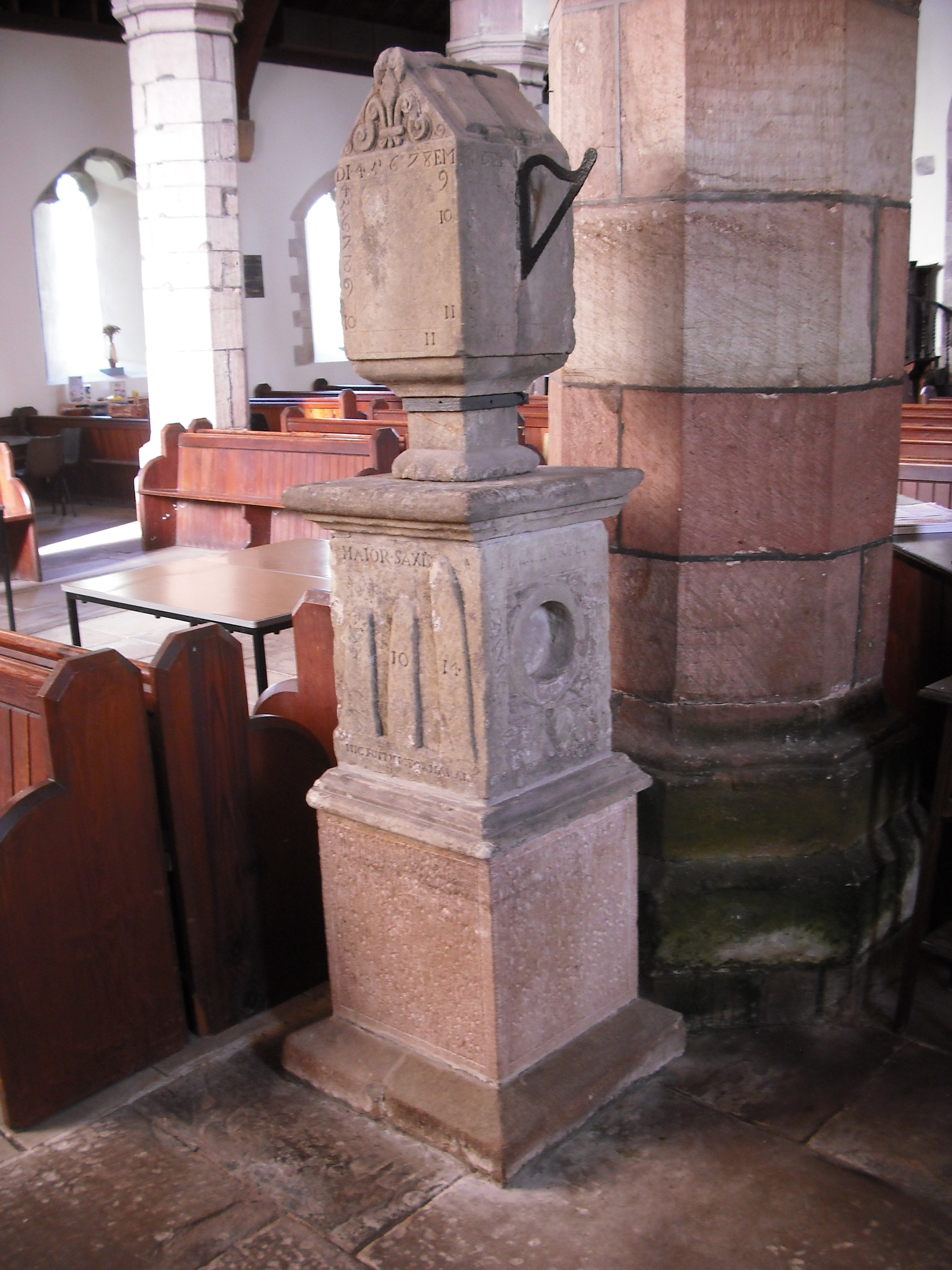
Lady Probert's Sundial

The architectural historian John Newman describes St Nicholas's as "one of the finest churches in the county". The church is constructed of Old Red Sandstone. Simon Jenkins notes that the stone is "so coated in lichen as to seem almost leprous. The church comprises a, two-aisle, nave, a chancel, a porch and the west tower. The tower is topped with a spire, rising "from behind a battlemented parapet". Jenkins suggests that the interior is "handsome but curiously cold"; it was plastered and painted, and a new floor laid, in the 1992 restoration. The arrangement of the altar rails is "a remarkable survival", following a "Laudian" plan. The church contains a Royal Coat of Arms of Charles II, dated 1683, and a 17th-century sundial, which originally stood in the open air near to the village school and was moved into the church in 1895. Donated by Lady Probert, of The Argoed, Penallt, and dated 1689, it shows three of the main attractions of Trellech; Tump Terret, with the inscriptions MAGNA MOLE ("Great in its Mound") and O QUOT HIC SEPULTI ("Oh! How many are buried here"); Harold's Stones with the inscriptions MAIOR SAXIS ("Greater in its Stones") and HIC FUIT VICTOR HARALDUS ("Here Harold was victorious"); and the Virtuous Well, with the inscription MAXIMA FONTE ("Greatest in its Well").

The church is a Grade I listed building, its Cadw report describing it as "an exceptionally fine and well preserved medieval church".
