= Beacon Hill, Monmouthshire =

Coordinates: 51.745°N 2.708°W

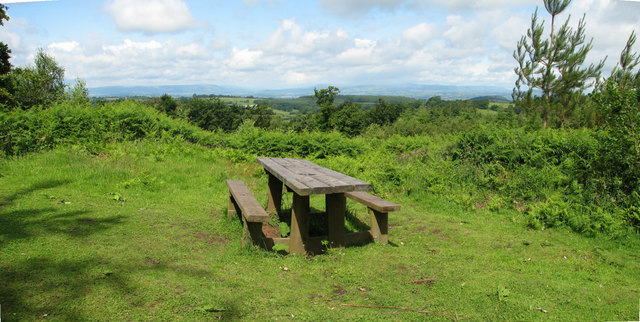
Beacon Hill picnic area

Beacon Hill is the highest hill in eastern Monmouthshire, South Wales. It is located 0.6 miles (0.97 km) due east of the village of Trellech, and 1 mile (1.6 km) north-west of Llandogo. Its crowning point at 306m / 1006 ft above sea level is marked by an Ordnance Survey triangulation pillar. The summit, eastern slopes and uppermost western slopes are owned by Natural Resources Wales which manages the area not only for timber production but for recreation also.

== Geology ==
The summit of the hill is formed from the Quartz Conglomerate Group which is assigned by geologists to the Upper Old Red Sandstone - a sequence of sedimentary rocks laid down during the late Devonian period. This pebbly sandstone occurs in an outcrop through eastern Monmouthshire and neighbouring Gloucestershire and caps other hills of local significance.

== Access ==
All freehold land owned by the former Forestry Commission Wales (now succeeded by Natural Resources Wales) was dedicated as access land under the Countryside and Rights of Way Act 2000 and is thus freely available to those on foot. Numerous forest tracks cross the hill's slopes. A car park has been provided on the western side and information panels installed at the site to assist visitors to interpret the extensive views from breaks in the woodland cover.
