= Trellech United =

- Community and electoral ward
- Location within Monmouthshire
- Population: 2,759 (2011)
- Principal area: Monmouthshire
- Country: Wales
- Sovereign state: United Kingdom
- Post town: CHEPSTOW
- Postcode district: NP16
- Post town: MONMOUTH
- Postcode district: NP25
- Dialling code: 01594/01600
- Police: Gwent
- Fire: South Wales
- Ambulance: Welsh
- UK Parliament: Monmouth
- Senedd Cymru – Welsh Parliament: Monmouth
- List of places UK Wales Monmouthshire 51.739°N 2.714°W Map of the community

Trellech United is a community and electoral ward in the county of Monmouthshire, Wales. It lies south of the county town of Monmouth next to the Wales-England border.

== Description ==
The community is located directly south of the town of Monmouth and is bordered to the east by the River Wye, the other side of which is the English county of Gloucestershire. Trellech United includes the villages of Trellech, Penallt, Catbrook, Llandogo, Llanishen and The Narth. The community also includes the Welsh side of the village of Redbrook.

In 2011 the population of Trellech United was 2,759.

The area has a history of mining, particularly for iron ore. The mines at Trellech provided the metals for the weapons and armoury of the De Clare family, headed by the Earl of Pembroke in the 13th century. Trellech became one of the largest settlements in Wales. There were ironworks and, later, paper mills established at Llandogo.

Notable landmarks are the Church of St Nicholas at Trellech, described as "one of the most impressive churches in the whole county of Monmouthshire". St Anne's Well, to the east of Trellech, is an ancient water source believed to have healing powers. There are sixty-seven listed buildings and structures in the community, including four churches, three Grade II* houses, a Grade II* listed dovecote and the Bigsweir Bridge over the Wye.

== Governance ==
Trellech United has a community council of thirteen community councillors, elected from the community wards of Catbrook, Llandogo, Llanishen, Penallt, The Narth, Trellech Town and Whitebrook.

Trellech United is also the name of a county electoral ward, which elects a county councillor to Monmouthshire County Council. The May 2017 election was won by Independent councillor, Debby Blakebrough, who had taken the seat from the Conservative Party at the May 2012 election.
