= The Argoed, Penallt =

The Argoed
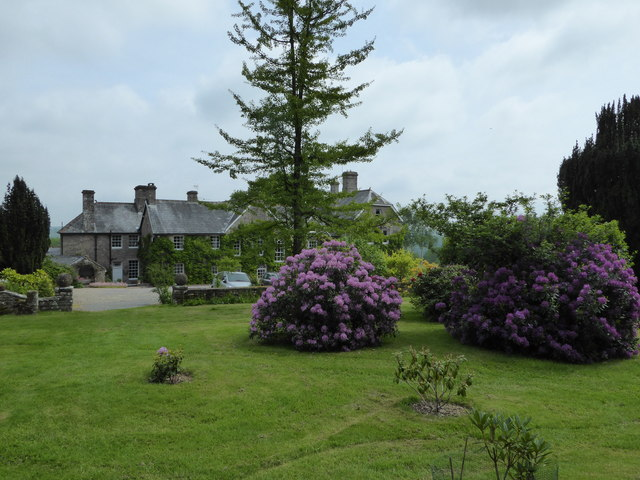
- The rear of the house

- Location within Monmouthshire
- 51.7726°N 2.6927°W
- Type: House
- Location: Penallt, Monmouthshire

History
- Built: Late 16th century, mid 19th century

Site notes
- Governing body: Private

Listed Building – Grade II*
- Official name: The Argoed
- Designated: 15 July 1993
- Reference no.: 2892

Cadw/ICOMOS Register of Parks and Gardens of Special Historic Interest in Wales
- Official name: The Argoed Garden
- Designated: 1 February 2022
- Reference no.: PGW(Gt)49(Mon)
- Listing: Grade II

The Argoed, Penallt, Monmouthshire, Wales, is a Victorian country house dating from the 1860s, with earlier origins from the late 16th and early 17th centuries. It is a Grade II* listed building and the garden is listed on the Cadw/ICOMOS Register of Parks and Gardens of Special Historic Interest in Wales. The English meaning of the Welsh word argoed is 'by a wood'.

== History ==
In the 17th century the house was the home of the Proberts, local landowners, members of parliament and High Sheriffs of Monmouthshire. (Note: The Proberts moved to The Argoed from their ancestral home, Pant Glas at Llanishen.) Richard Potter, Chairman of the Great Western Railway and father of Beatrice Webb, bought the house in 1865 and undertook extensive rebuilding. Beatrice Webb was a founder member of the Fabian Society and, in the later 19th and early 20th centuries, she entertained many prominent friends at the Argoed, including George Bernard Shaw. Shaw is rumoured to have written his plays The Man of Destiny and Mrs. Warren's Profession whilst staying at the house. In the 1980s, the Argoed was owned by Robert Plant of the rock band Led Zeppelin.

== Architecture ==
The architectural historian John Newman describes the Argoed as "a large, two-storeyed stone house (and) a tantalizing one." The central block is original and irregular, its "windows all 18th century sashes." Potter's re-building included a larger block to the south and a service wing to the north. The interior has been greatly reconstructed. The grounds are largely from the 19th and 20th centuries, though they include "17th century terraces of potential archaeological interest." The triangular plot has gardens which include wide gravel drives, formal lawns, terraces and ha-has which look out over the Wye valley. The gardens are listed at Grade II on the Cadw/ICOMOS Register of Parks and Gardens of Special Historic Interest in Wales and are recorded by the RCAHMW on their Coflein database.

== Bibliography ==
- Newman, John (2000). Gwent/Monmouthshire. The Buildings of Wales. Penguin. ISBN 0140710531.
