= Stuart Wilson (archaeologist) =

Stuart Wilson (born 8 February 1979) is an English archaeologist.

He was born in Reading, Berkshire, England. His main work has been related to Trellech, a village in Monmouthshire, south east Wales. He believes he has discovered the ruins of the lost medieval town of Trellech, at one time one of the largest settlements in Wales, although his views are contested. Archaeological excavations at Trellech had taken place for some years, but in Wilson's view the previous digs had been concentrated on the wrong area and he bought a field in which his subsequent excavations have been conducted. During successful and well supported excavations, Wilson's team identified, among other significant objects, a unique medieval flower, a Legion of Honour medal, a pottery finial, a post-medieval wall enclosed mummified cat, large amounts of medieval pottery and other finds in amongst several medieval stone buildings. He established an organisation called "The Lost City of Trellech Project" to further explore this area of significant historical importance. In 2006 his work was featured in a BBC Radio 4 documentary.
