= Stuart Wilson (musician) =

- Genres: Reggae, Jazz and Blues
- Occupation: Musician
- Labels: Love Culture Entertainment
- Website: stuartwilsonmusic.com

Stuart Wilson is a Reggae, Jazz and Blues musician from the Cayman Islands. Stuart Wilson's music has been branded as a Reggae Renaissance, which includes elements of Jazz, Classic Rock and Blues.

== Early life ==
Stuart Wilson started out singing and playing the guitar in the Church with his Grand Mother before deciding to put concentrate on his schooling. The Artist made the difficult decision to take a break from music to accomplish his degree at St. Thomas University, Miami Florida. After spending years as a journalist, working in television, radio and print in the Cayman Islands, Stuart left his career as a journalist to refocus his efforts on music.

== Career ==
In 2013, Stuart Wilson began working with Legendary Reggae Producer Clive Hunt along with other notables in the industry such as Dean Fraser, Sly Dunbar and many other stalwarts in the industry, including Jason Gilbert who won a Grammy for his work on Eminem's album Recovery.

In 2014 Stuart Wilson made his debut at Reggae Sumfest with his band Love Culture Stuart then went on to Thailand to play a dizzying 72 shows over a three month period with his band before returning to Jamaica.

In 2016 Stuart Wilson released his first Number One Single in Jamaica titled, "Feel for You" and has since been playing a series of acoustic and full ensemble shows, in London, as well as around the Caribbean.

== Discography ==
EPs

- Holding the Fort

Singles

- "Three Kings" (2012)
- "Real Come Back Story" (2013)
- "Leroy Can't be Wrong" (2014)
- "Feel for You" (2016)
