= Penallt =

Village in Monmouthshire, Wales

Coordinates: 51.77907°N 2.69458°W

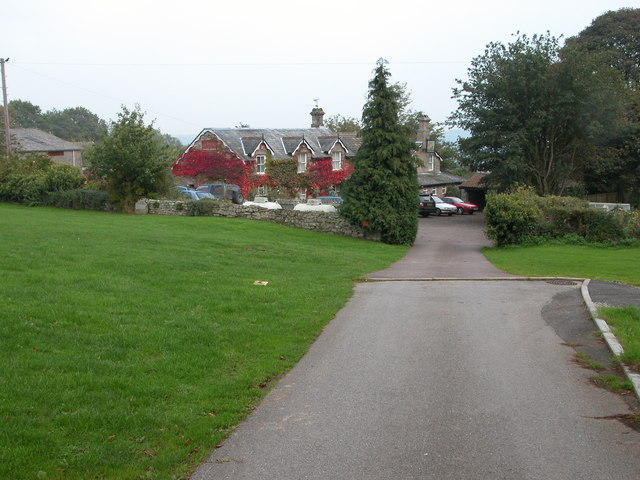
- The Bush Inn

- Location within Monmouthshire
- OS grid reference: SO521091
- Community: Trellech United
- Principal area: Monmouthshire
- Preserved county: Gwent
- Country: Wales
- Sovereign state: United Kingdom
- Post town: MONMOUTH
- Postcode district: NP25
- Dialling code: 01600
- Police: Gwent
- Fire: South Wales
- Ambulance: Welsh
- UK Parliament: Monmouth

Penallt (also spelled Penalt) is a village in Monmouthshire, Wales, situated high on a hill 4 kilometres (2 1/2 mi) south of Monmouth. In the centre of the village, by the village green, stands the 17th-century village pub, the Bush Inn.

== Description ==
Nearby, Penallt Old Church Wood is a 10-acre (40,000 m^{2}) nature reserve managed by the Gwent Wildlife Trust. This deciduous woodland provides a habitat for several bird species, including pied flycatchers, nuthatches, tree pipits, treecreepers and sparrowhawks. Plant species found in the reserve include wild daffodils and moschatel.

Penallt Old Church is located approximately a mile north of the village. The main part of the building dates from the 15th or early 16th century, while the lower part of the tower may date from the 14th century. The heavy oak door bears the date 1532. The church was restored in 1887. The churchyard cross has a base and lower shaft of 15th-century date. The church dedication is unknown, though there is a local tradition that it was St James, the patron saint of pilgrims. Inside is the royal coat of arms of Queen Anne dating from 1709.

The Argoed, a 17th-century mansion, lies to the south-east of the village. It was once owned by the father of Beatrice Webb, the British socialist, economist and reformer. Robert Plant of Led Zeppelin owned it in the 1980s. George Bernard Shaw stayed with the Webb family and described Penallt as a "special place" Other residents of the village include Jeremy Cook, the BBC's rural affairs correspondent, and the television presenter Kate Humble. Walter Keeler is a renowned potter specialising in salt glaze pottery.

== Gallery ==
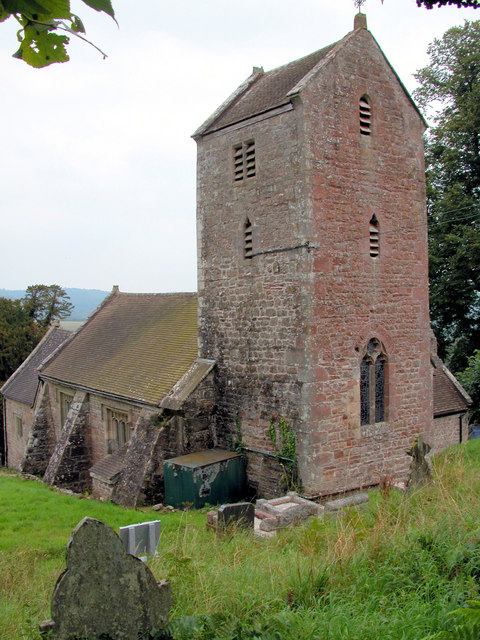
Penallt Old Church

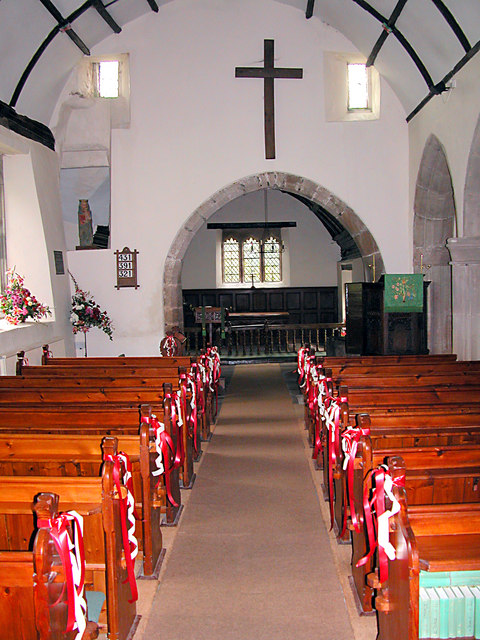
Interior of the church

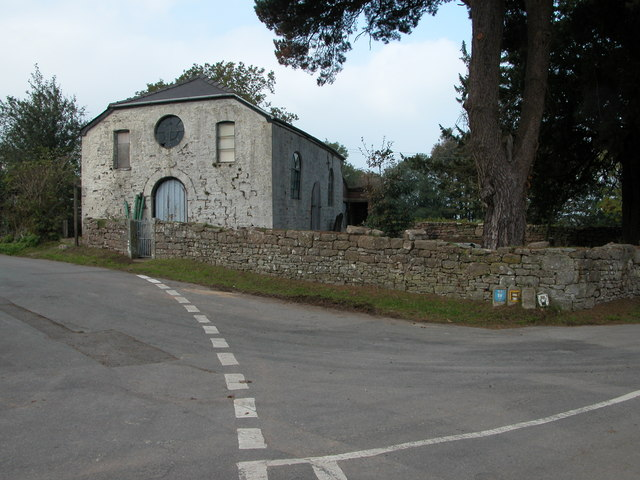
Old chapel

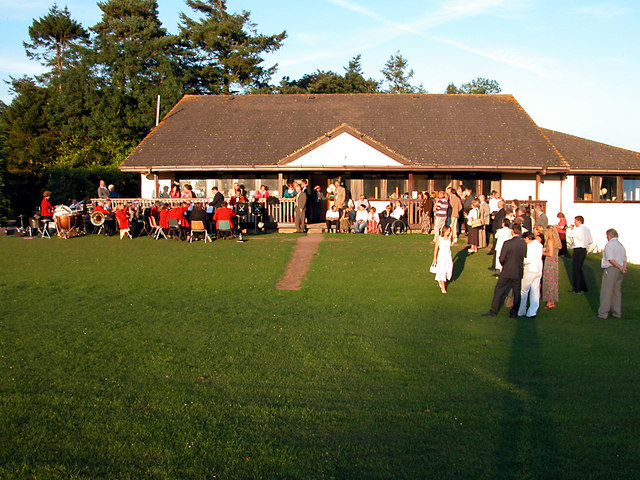
Pelham Hall

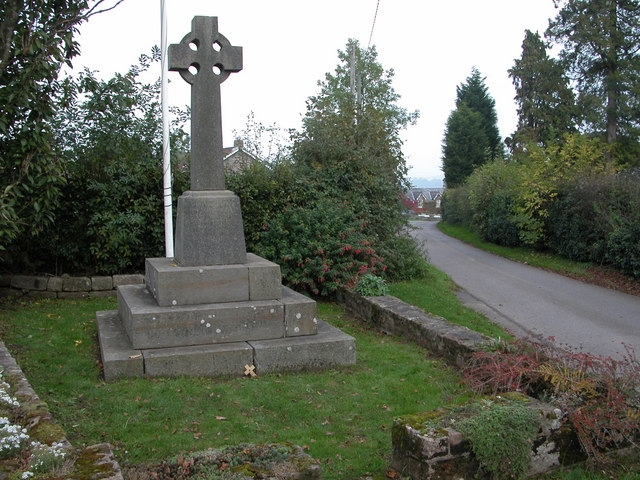
The war memorial

== See also ==
- Penallt Halt railway station
- Penallt Viaduct
