= Trellech =

Coordinates: 51.74506°N 2.72560°W

Trellech: Welsh: Tryleg
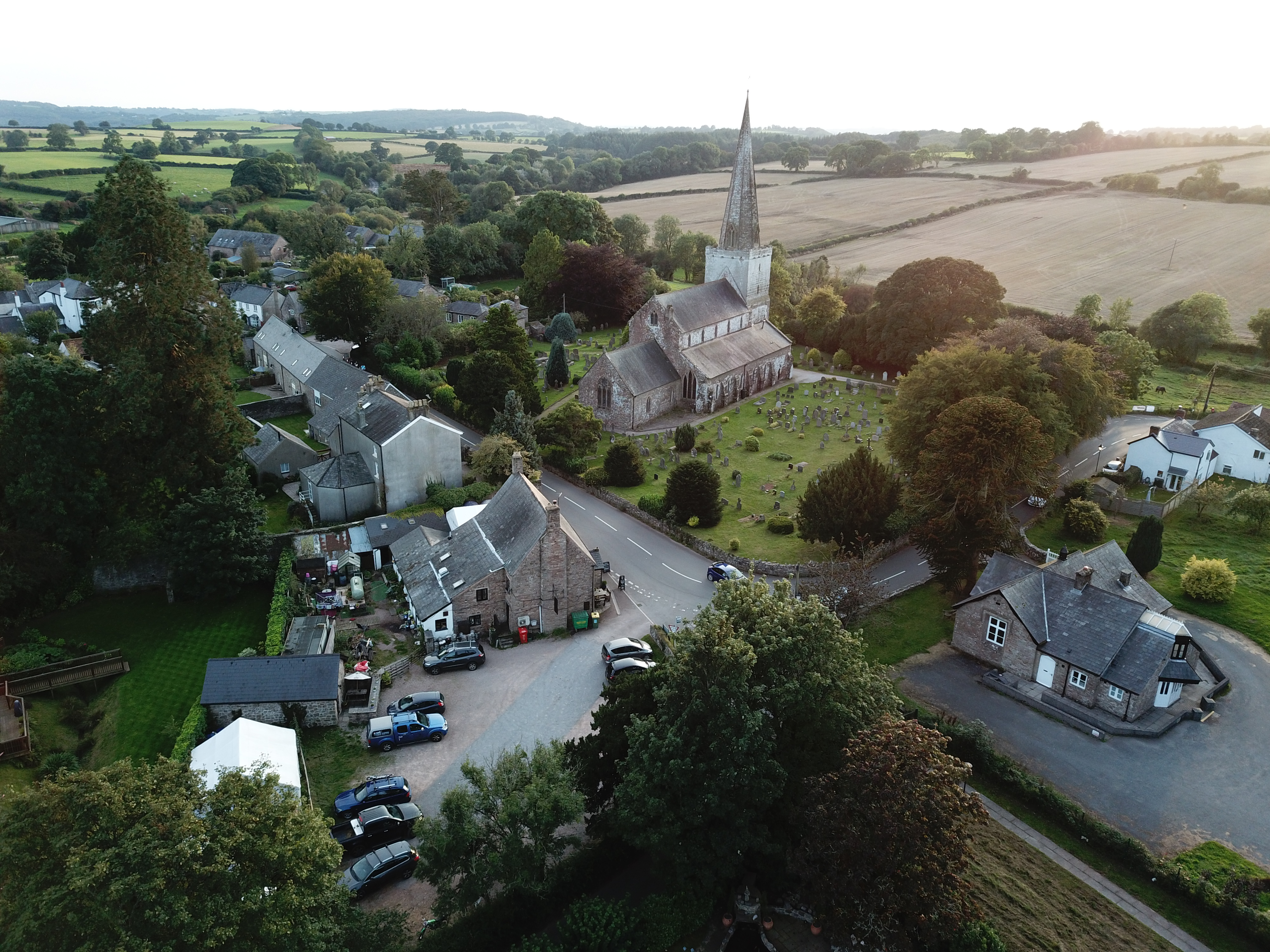
- Trellech from the air

- Location within Monmouthshire
- OS grid reference: SO500054
- Community: Trellech United
- Principal area: Monmouthshire
- Preserved county: Gwent
- Country: Wales
- Sovereign state: United Kingdom
- Post town: MONMOUTH
- Postcode district: NP25
- Dialling code: 01600
- Police: Gwent
- Fire: South Wales
- Ambulance: Welsh
- UK Parliament: Monmouthshire
- Senedd Cymru – Welsh Parliament: Monmouth

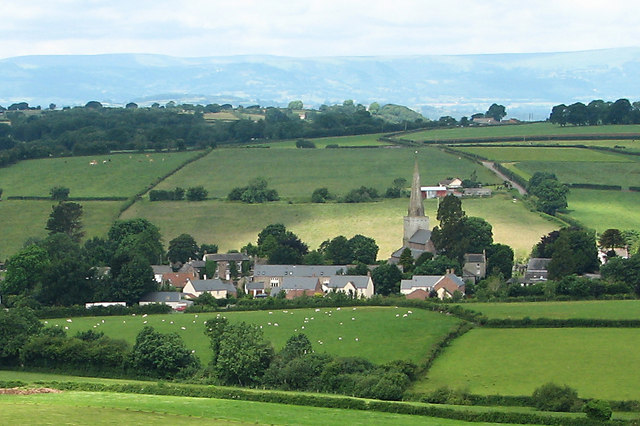
Trellech viewed from Beacon Hill

Trellech (occasionally spelt Trelech, Treleck or Trelleck; Welsh: Tryleg) is a village and parish in Monmouthshire, south-east Wales. Located 5 miles (8 km) south of Monmouth and 4 miles (6.4 km) north-north-west of Tintern, Trellech lies on a plateau above the Wye Valley on the southern fringes of 320 acres (130 ha) of woodland in an Area of Outstanding Natural Beauty. Three Bronze Age standing stones are situated in the village, known as Harold's Stones, which overlook the historic church of St Nicholas, a Grade I listed building.

Although a relatively small village in modern times, it was one of the largest towns in Wales in the 13th century, and is now a site of archaeological interest to determine its extent and role at that time. The village is designated as a conservation area.

There are four nature reserves nearby; New Grove Flower Meadow, noted for its orchids, and Trellech Beacon are both owned by Gwent Wildlife Trust while Cleddon Bog and Croes Robert Wood are both SSSIs.

== Etymology ==
It is thought that the Welsh name Tryleg probably means 'conspicuous stone' and derives from the intensifying prefix try- and *lleg, an unrecorded variant of the common noun llech 'stone, slab'. If so, the name probably refers to a large stone that once stood on a mound about a mile-and-a-half north of the village. Historical forms of the name vary between Try-, Tri- and Tre-. It is likely that the three standing stones known as Harold's Stones influenced those forms that begin with Tri- (Welsh tri 'three'). Another Welsh noun tre(f) 'settlement, town' has probably influenced forms that begin with Tre-. The noun llech, mentioned above, has also influenced various forms of the name. The <ll> in the English form Trellech is given its English pronunciation (not as Welsh [ɬ]). Likewise, the final <ch> is pronounced as [k] not as Welsh [χ].

The village is noteworthy because of the variety of different modern spellings of the name. Historically, up to 30 different variations of the name have been recorded, of which four are still commonly used. On each of the three roads entering the village, signs give a different spelling: Trellech, Trelleck and Trelech.

== History ==
Trellech was one of the major towns of medieval Wales, the remains of which have been subject to archaeological excavations which have been sustained over many years and which continue today. It is most likely that the town was established by the De Clare family specifically for the exploitation of local supplies of iron ore from the Forest of Dean, and charcoal produced in the surrounding woodlands, to provide weapons, armour and iron work for their military advances in Wales, including the building of Caerphilly Castle. By 1288 there were 378 burgage plots recorded in Trellech, which would have made it bigger than Cardiff or Chepstow at the time. Trellech was largely destroyed in 1291 as a result of a raid following a dispute over alleged deer poaching. The Black Death struck in 1340 and again in 1350. Subsequently, the ravages of Owain Glyndŵr and his men in the early 15th century further reduced the prosperity and in consequence the importance of Trellech.

=== Archaeological investigations ===
Archaeological investigations at Trellech have been led since the early 1990s by the South Wales Centre for Historical and Interdisciplinary Research at the University of Wales, Newport. There is currently some dispute over the layout and development of the medieval town and its environs. In 2005, Stuart Wilson bought a field in which, he was convinced, were remains of the lost medieval town. Wilson had previously broken into sites and undermined the work of other archaeologists in the area, claiming he "once sneaked onto Howell's dig site to prove an ancient wall the professor had uncovered was really a modern field drain." .This site had first been identified as of potential interest by (the unrelated) Julia Wilson, in 1998.

Stuart Wilson's interest in this field and the possibility that his hunch might be correct was the subject of a 30-minute BBC Radio 4 documentary, presented by the archaeologist Francis Pryor, and entitled The Boy Who Bought a Field, broadcast on 6 March 2006. The programme revealed that Wilson had apparently discovered medieval walls and yard-paving. In 2008 the Monmouth Archaeological Society said, "there is now no room for debate" that the excavations by Wilson and others have identified the main part of the medieval town to be around the minor road towards Catbrook, to the south of the current village, on what is now farmland. In 2016, Wilson proposed turning the site into a camp site, research centre and tourist attraction. Some of Wilson's claims have been criticised by academic archaeologists.

== Places of historical interest ==
=== Church of St Nicholas ===
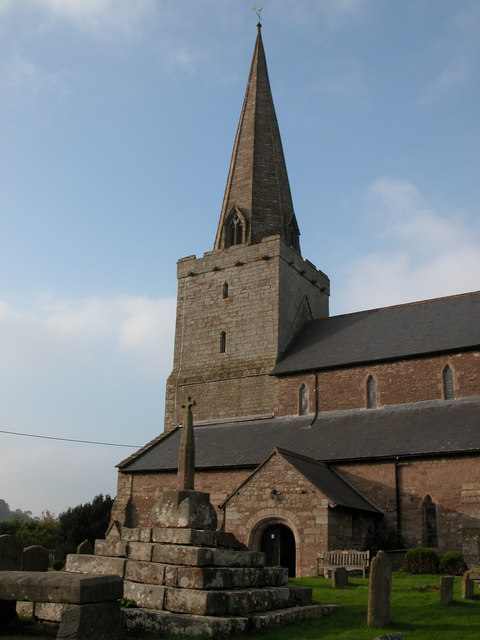
St Nicholas' Church

The Anglican parish church has been designated a Grade I listed building since 19 November 1953, and is described by Joseph Bradney as "one of the largest and most handsome of the country churches in the county" of Monmouthshire. With an elegant pointed and prominent steeple, a font and 17th-century sundial, it is a focal point of the village. The main part of the church building is of local Old Red Sandstone, with a three-stage tower. The stone spire can be seen for several miles around and is described by architectural writer John Newman as "the town's pride and joy".

A church on this site, probably a wooden structure, was endowed by Ffernfael ap Ithel and Meurig ap Tewdrig who were rulers of Gwent in the 7th and 8th centuries. The Preaching Cross in the churchyard is early Medieval in date, as is the font. The present building dates from the 13th or early 14th century. The early English Gothic stonework has been dated to between 1225 and 1272, and that of the Decorated Gothic up to 1350. The church has a large clerestoried nave, with a much smaller chancel. The "impressive" interior has a "spendidly high" tower arch, and the five-bay nave has arcades on octagonal piers. The altar rails and pulpit, dated 1640, are survivals of 17th century church interior design. At the west end of the church, directly below the window, is a Royal Coat of Arms for King Charles II dated 1683. Records are held by the church dating from 1692. Complete lists of vicars, from 1359, and churchwardens, from 1763, can be found in the entrance to the south aisle. The rear of the main church door is inscribed "IHS 1595".

When the weathercock was removed from the spire in 1972 it was found to have been made in Ross-on-Wye in 1792. The original spire fell, damaging the roof of the nave, and a contemporary reference attributes this to "lightning and storms". In the belfry the cage housing the three bells is of a type similar to that found in others constructed about the year 1700. At the end of the last century the church was in a neglected state and was extensively renovated and re-roofed. The Belgian slates then in place were replaced with Welsh slates in 1961. The chancel was replastered in 1972 and painted white. During 1974 considerable repairs were undertaken to the north and south aisles, and in 2001 the majority of the churchyard dry-stone wall was removed and rebuilt.

==== Sundial ====
The church contains a stone sundial, dated 1689, which was originally set up by Lady Probert of the Argoed, Penallt. Three of the four faces of the sundial show the village's historic features: Tump Terret, with the inscriptions MAGNA MOLE ("Great in its Mound") and O QUOT HIC SEPULTI ("Oh! How many are buried here"); Harold's Stones with the inscriptions MAIOR SAXIS ("Greater in its Stones") and HIC FUIT VICTOR HARALDUS ("Here Harold was victorious"); and the Virtuous Well, with the inscriptions MAXIMA FONTE ("Greatest in its Well") and DOM. MAGD. PROBERT OSTENDIT ("Lady Magdalen Probert gives proof of it"). The sundial stood in a garden, on top of the inverted ancient font, until both were moved inside the church in the early 20th century. A carved wooden replica of the sundial was placed in a field south of the village in recent years.

=== Harold's Stones ===
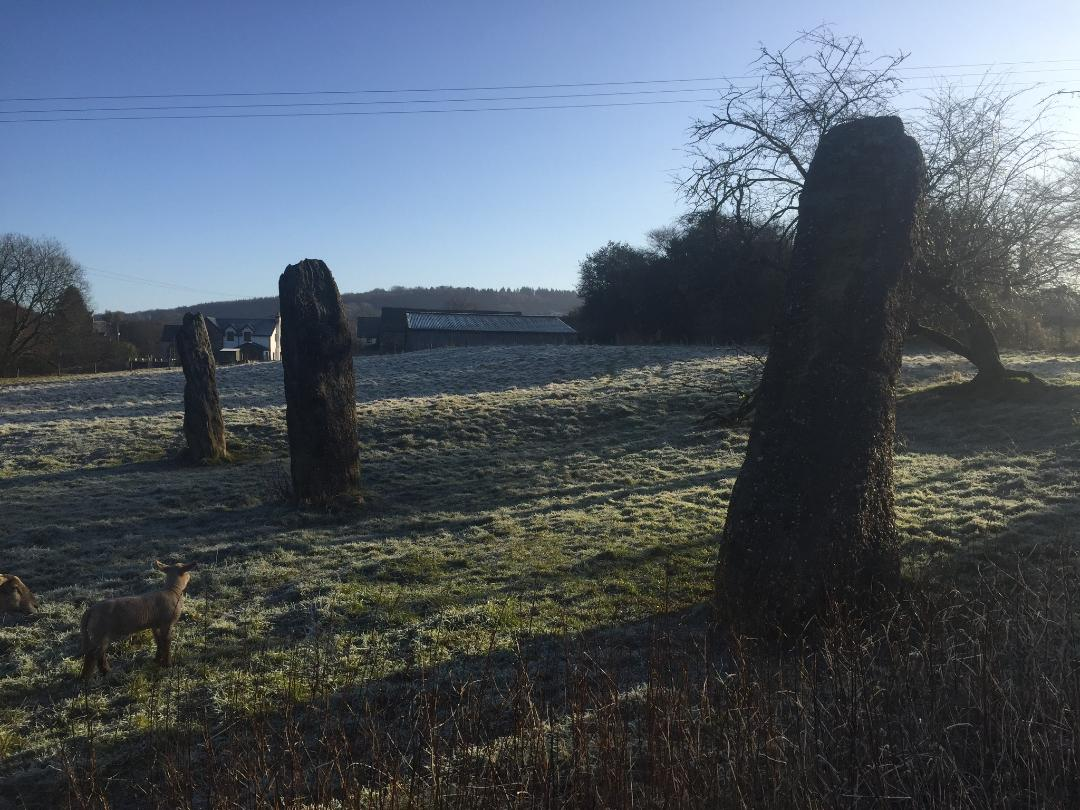
Harold's Stones, looking north east

Three large monoliths of conglomerate stone, commonly referred to as puddingstone, are located in a field on the eastern side of the B4293 to the south of the village. (SO 498051) The stones, situated on publicly accessible land belonging to the Davies family of Crosshands Farm, are a scheduled monument. The stones have been described as "one of the more substantial megalithic monuments in Monmouthshire".

The stones are on slightly elevated ground close to running water and springs, which might be relevant to the choice of site. They are believed to date back to the Bronze Age. Such remains are rare in this part of Wales. Various local traditions are ascribed to them: that they were erected by Harold Godwinson to celebrate a victory over the Welsh in 1063; that they commemorate three chieftains who fell fighting against the Romans; or that they were flung from the Skirrid by the mythical Jack o' Kent in a trial of strength with the Devil.

The stones form an approximate line running between north-east and south-west at an azimuth of about 229°, which probably indicates the midwinter sunset, though the midsummer sunrise cannot be excluded on account of the lack of precise alignment of the stones. They have been described as "the most visually impressive of the alignments in South Wales." Their location, without good views beyond the immediate surroundings, suggests that its alignment may be significant. The stones are respectively 2.7 metres (8 ft 10 in), 3.7 metres (12 ft), and 4.6 metres (15 ft) high, the tallest being at the south-west; the overall length of the row is 11 metres (36 ft). The central stone has what are thought to be cup marks. It is supposed that the stones were dragged to the site on logs and levered into position, probably either for seasonal information or for use at religious ceremonies. Houlder (1978) speculates that they were once part of a much larger and impressive alignment, but Castleden (1992) suggests that they did not form part of a stone circle

Aubrey Burl asserts that short stone-rows of this kind were used as the ritual centres of families of "perhaps ten or twenty adults and children", though the erection of large stones required the co-operation of several such families. He compared the Trellech stones to the row at Le Vieux-Moulin, Plouharnel, near Carnac, and says that "Similar short rows were erected by communities in Ireland, Britain and Brittany in the centuries of the Bronze age between 1800 and 1000 BC". The source of the Trellech stones may have been the nearby Beacon Hill where there are outcrops of a similar conglomerate. A fourth stone, on nearby common land, is believed to have been destroyed in the 18th century.

=== Tump Terret and Court Farm ===
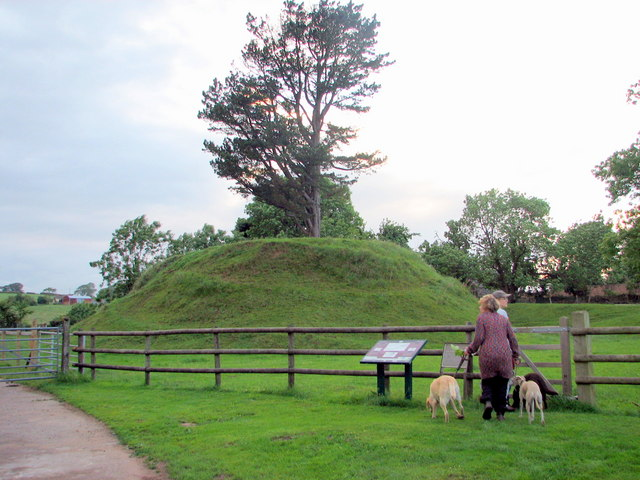
Tump Terret

Tump Terret is situated within the grounds of Court Farm to the southwest of the church. It dates back to Norman times, as the site of a small motte and bailey castle; traces of its surrounding ditch remain. It was known to be in existence before 1231 and the castle was still extant in 1263, when it was mentioned in manorial documents. A local myth, commemorated on the sundial, was that it was a burial mound for those killed in actions between the forces of Harold Godwinson and the opposing Welsh. A now-vanished summer house was built by the Rumsey family on top of the mound.

Trellech Court – now the site of the farmhouse – was the seat of a branch of the Seymour family until it passed to John Rumsey in the early 18th century. The existing building is, according to Bradney, "a building of no architectural features", and dates from around the time of Rumsey's ownership. It was converted into a farmhouse in the later 19th century.

=== The Virtuous Well ===
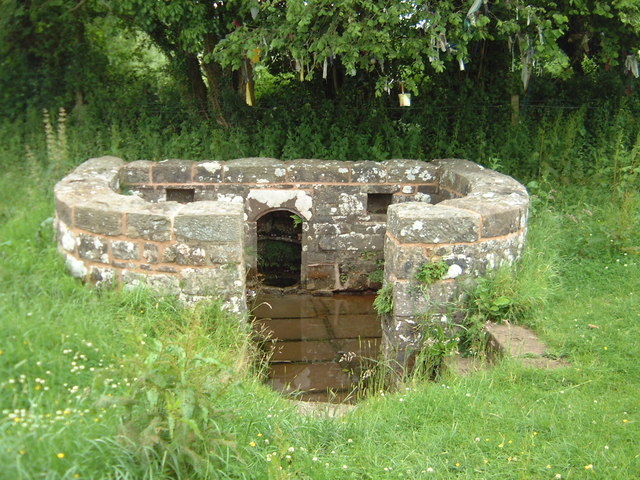
The Virtuous Well

Sometimes known as St Anne's Well, this circular wellspring, surrounded by a stone wall and seating, is located in a field on the left of the road to Tintern, about 400 yards (370 m) east of the village. Local tradition is that it is the only one remaining of originally nine holy wells in Trellech. In the 17th century, it was reportedly much frequented, and reputed to cure "the scurvy, colic and other distempers". Water from the well is rich in chalybeate.

It is a clootie well, where token offerings are placed around and within the well, and strips of cloth and ribbons are hung from neighbouring trees. It is also used as a wishing well. Traditionally, "to make a wish one threw into the water a small metal object. Many bubbles arising from it meant a rapid granting of one's wish, few bubbles meant that a long period of time would elapse before the wish came true and no bubbles at all meant that one's wish had not been granted. The young maidens of Trellech anxious to know how long they had to wait until their wedding day, would drop a pebble into the water and every bubble that arose counted for one month."

== The Village Hall / The Babington Centre ==
The building now known as the Trellech Village Hall, previously The Babington Centre was constructed in 1820 as a primary school. A school was first established in the village in 1591 by the epigrammatist John Owen, and a century later, in 1691, a new school was set up by the local vicar, Zachary Babington, a relative of the bishop of Llandaff, Gervase Babington. Babington established a charity to enable poor children in the village to be educated.

When Trellech Primary School moved to a new site on the north side of the village, the 1820 school building was claimed by the Diocese of Monmouth, but eventually passed to the Trellech Babington Educational Trust, a registered charity established in 1992. The Babington Centre is now the main asset owned by the Babington Educational Foundation. The Centre is a focus for many aspects of village life including film nights, concerts, educational classes and other social events.

== The Lion Inn ==
Built in the late 16th century and completed in 1580, the grade II listed Lion Inn was originally a coaching inn, brew house and pig farm. Many of the original features of the brewing cellar still remain, as do a number of outhouses that were used as pigsties. The Lion Inn has won CAMRA awards for its real ales. The inn has activities including an annual beer festival, a cider and perry festival, the entering of a team in the Monmouth raft race and a Burns Night celebration. Alternate Mondays feature 'Open Mic' nights.

== Notable people ==
Philosopher, logician and mathematician Bertrand Russell (1872–1970) was born at Cleddon Hall, then known as "Ravenscroft", the country home of his parents Lord and Lady Amberley, situated between Trellech and Llandogo.

Kate Humble, the television presenter, farms in Trellech. In 2013 Spice Girls singer Melanie Chisholm had a house in Catbrook, 2 miles (3.2 km) to the south of the village.
