= Angidy River =

River in Monmouthshire, Wales

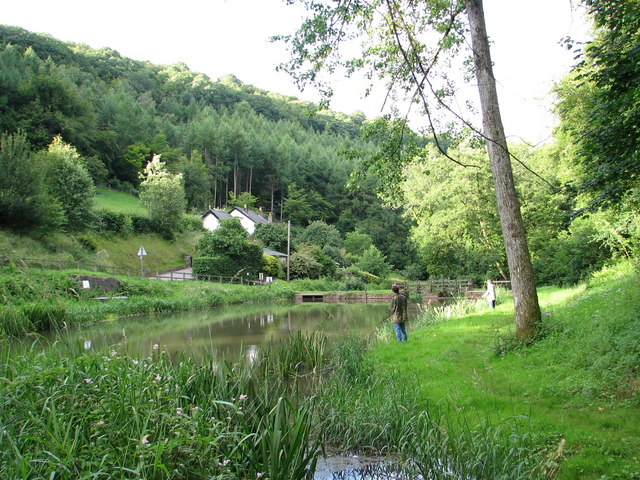
- One of the pond areas along the Angidy River
- Native name: Afon Anghidi (Welsh)

Location
- Country: Wales
- County: Monmouthshire
- Community: Wye Valley

Physical characteristics
- Mouth
  - location: Tintern
  - coordinates: 51.6990°N 2.6813°W

The Angidy River, or Angidy Brook, (also spelled Angiddy; Welsh: Afon Anghidi) is a tributary of the River Wye in Monmouthshire, Wales. It is the location of the first-ever blast furnace and brass production in Great Britain and notable developments in the iron industry, especially wire-making, which made it the largest industrial enterprise in Wales and a tourist venue. It is now better known for its natural beauty and fishing.

== Geography ==
The underlying rock of the area was formed during the Devonian and Carboniferous periods. The brook and the tributaries leading to it run most of their course through Devonian Brownstones formation sandstone formed between 419.2 and 393.3 million years ago (mya). Closer to the Wye the brook goes through Devonian and Carboniferous Tintern sandstone formed between 372.2 and 346.7 mya. At the end of the valley, on the right looking downstream, are strata of mudstone and limestone from between 358.9 and 346.7 mya which overlie Tintern sandstone on the hills; this was used to feed historical limekilns after which Limekiln Wood and Brook are so named. The Anghidi Fawr (Welsh for 'great Angidy') is joined by the Anghidi Fechan ('little Angidy'), Fedw Brook and other streams from the surrounding hills before joining the Wye. The valley is steep-sided and there are occasional flooding incidents; following a severe flood in 1993, an alleviation scheme where the Angidy passes under the A466 and joins the Wye was implemented, but it was not considered cost effective to act further up the Angiddy. The remains of old quarries for sandstone exist along the valley amongst the woods. Much of the stone for the abbey came from the quarry in Barbadoes Wood at the valley end.

== History ==
The Angidy has long attracted human occupation. Lower Hale Wood on the north side of the valley contains three Bronze Age round barrows labelled A, B and C, of funerary and ritual significance, which now lie in dense managed woodland. Cairn A is a stone ring 26 metres across, cairn B is a stone mound 14 metres by 12 and cairn C is circular of 10 metres diameter. They are scheduled monuments. An Iron Age golden stater coin of Anterdig, King of the Dobunni, found in the area is another indicator of early occupation of the area. Land on both sides of the Wye around Tintern Abbey — founded in 1131 by Richard de Clare, earl of Striguil (now Chepstow) — was given to Cistercian monks from the Abbaye Notre Dame de l'Aumône, north of Blois. Building of a simple abbey started five years later. The monks were known as successful farmers, in a system of granges, and they prospered. Weirs built along the Angidy are attributed to monks from the abbey to power two grain mills and a fulling mill; pools above the weirs were used as fish ponds. The rebuilt abbey (current remains) was completed in 1320, originally under the influence of Roger Bigod.

In the later 14th century the Abbey economy collapsed due to the Black Death and in the early 15th century it suffered attacks through Owain Glyndŵr. In 1536 the abbey, with its 13 remaining monks, surrendered, was dissolved and its lands granted to Henry Somerset, 2nd Earl of Worcester. The buildings round the church were used for businesses or destroyed. As well as the abbey itself, local houses and businesses were constructed using sandstones of different colours from the quarries. In 2021, an arched, stone tunnel about 1.3 metres high inside, parallel to the Angidy and below the public footpath was discovered by electrical company workers. Its purpose remains unknown but Cadw's initial estimation was that it dates from the 14th century, implying a connection with the abbey.

In order to end reliance on imports of metal products in the Elizabethan era, a blast furnace was built between 1564 and 1566 in the valley using the expertise of the German Christopher Schutz and 20 of his compatriots. The valley had water power, plenty of local wood for charcoal as fuel (i.e. with no impurities for osmond iron production) and nearby iron ore. This was part of a monopoly, the Company of Mineral and Battery Works. Here, in 1568, he produced the first British brass - known as 'latten' - but difficulties with local raw materials meant brass-making did not go well and the production of iron wire from ingots made from osmond iron - also using German-developed practices - soon became most important. By the end of the 16th century, 600 workers were producing iron goods that were exported internationally. Despite the legal monopoly, the local wire industry continued to be affected somewhat by imported materials. Different forges, furnaces, mills and wireworks were developed along the Angidy down to the dock at the Wye. By the 19th century there were about 20 waterwheels.

Mills changed use over they years e.g. Abbey Mill for corn, then iron, back to corn then as a saw mill for stone and wood. The noise and spectacle attracted tourists, brought up river from Chepstow and from the 19th century by road and later by railway; amongst these were painters and poets such as William Turner and William Wordsworth respectively. Iron ore from the Forest of Dean and Lancashire was brought upstream. Charcoal was made locally and also brought in by horse. Some workers lived amongst the ruins of the abbey. The graves of workers are around the derelict St. Mary's Church on the hillside. Water-power was gradually superseded by steam-powered production elsewhere in the 19th century. In 1878, works were leased to make tin plate. In 1879, the Duke of Beaufort - also Henry Somerset, like his ancestor - granted a 40-year lease to manufacturers of charcoal and various types of wire, nails and other ferrous products, but between 1895 and 1901 industrial activity ceased for what had been the leading wire-making centre of Great Britain from the mid 16th to late 19th century.

=== Scheduled monuments ===
- Three round barrows in Lower Hale Wood, Bronze Age.
- The Bay, 17th century cottage (51.69851°N 2.68274°W).
- Lower or Abbey Works: remains of iron forge. Site of first British wire production, and later tin plate production in 1880s. (51.69949°N 2.70484°W).
- Dam and retaining wall for pond for wireworks/tinplate works, mid 19th century (51.697451°N 2.6876565°W).
- Royal George Hotel, 1598 (51.698050°N 2.6820370°W).
- Crown Lodge, c.1800 (51.697731°N 2.6827702°W).
- Old Tramway Bridge, 1872-5 (51.699313°N 2.6814628°W).
- Furnace dam, c.18th century (51.698740°N 2.7022757°W).
- Furnace Cottages, c.18th century (51.698748°N 2.7055459°W).
- Old Furnace Blast Furnace, 1664 (51.699263°N 2.7050474°W).
- Beaufort Pond Dam, from c. 16th century (51.700547°N 2.7113474°W).
- Tintern Upper Wireworks (New Tongs Mill) leat, c.1800 (51.699750°N 2.7122175°W).

== Natural history ==
Despite the iron industry, the valley continued to be regarded as being of great beauty. Today, brown trout and invertebrates continue to thrive in the Angidy. It is known for kingfishers, dippers, and more common water birds such as mute swans, geese and herons. Sand martins nest in the banks in summer. Bluebells, sorrel and wild garlic grow along the banks and in the woods.

The afal Anghidi (Welsh for 'Angidy apple') is listed as a Welsh heritage apple, originally from a tree in the garden of The Globe pub in the valley, the site of which is now used for housing. Considered as a multi-use apple, the fruit was used to make cider for local workers.

== Modern usage ==
The farming industry remains in the surrounding fields; there is local dairy ice cream and cheese production. A trout fishery has continued to use the old weirs created in the river to fill three fishing ponds for hundreds of years to date, containing wild and stocked fish. Tourism continues to be a source of income with the remains of abbey on the other side of the Wye and different holiday experiences. The various former sites of the brass- and iron-making industries that are scheduled monuments are features of the Angidy Trail, an 8-kilometre (5-mile) circular walking route, included in the Wye Valley National Landscape, a designated Area of Outstanding Natural Beauty.

== Gallery ==
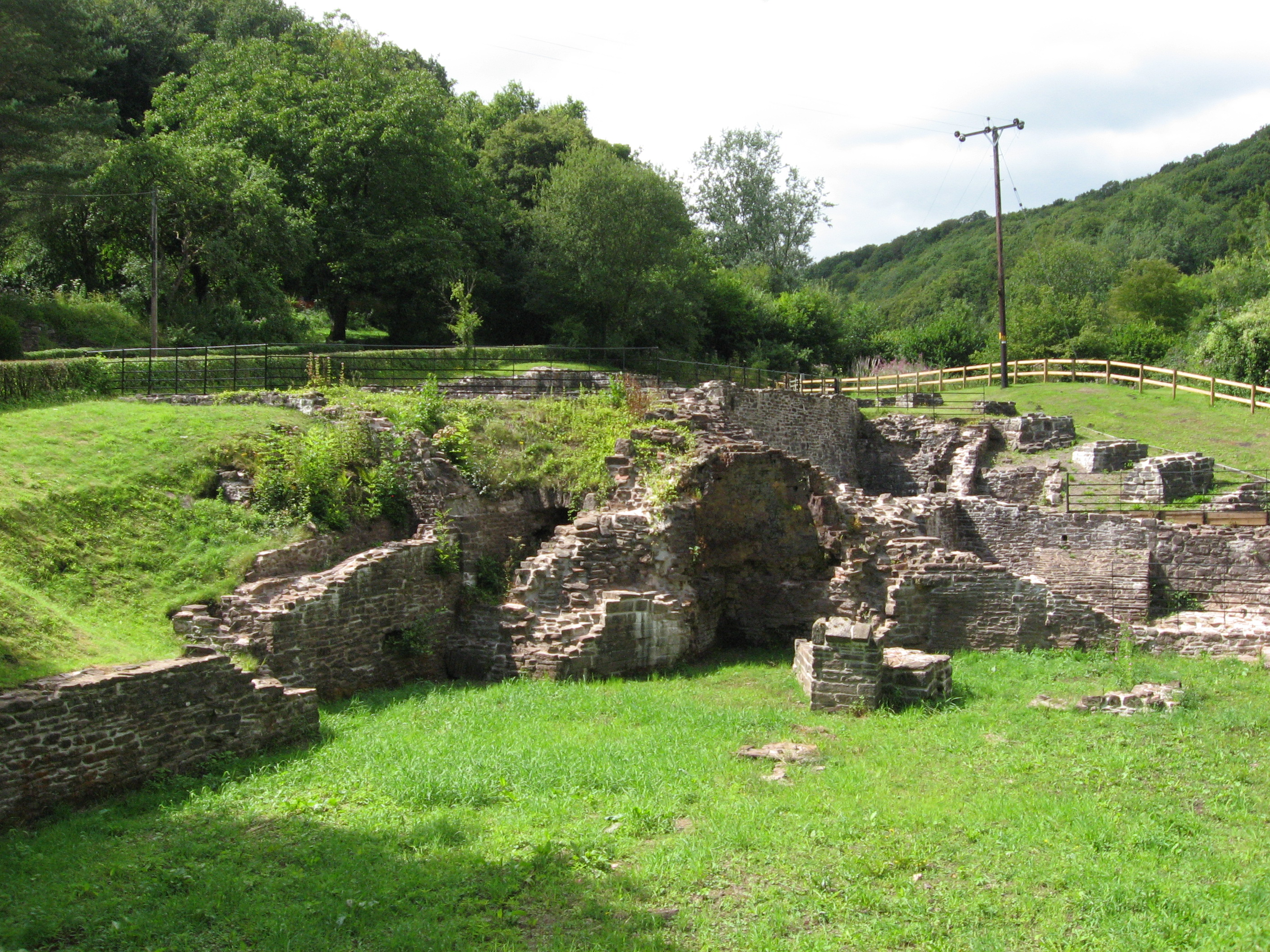
Remains of the old blast furnace.

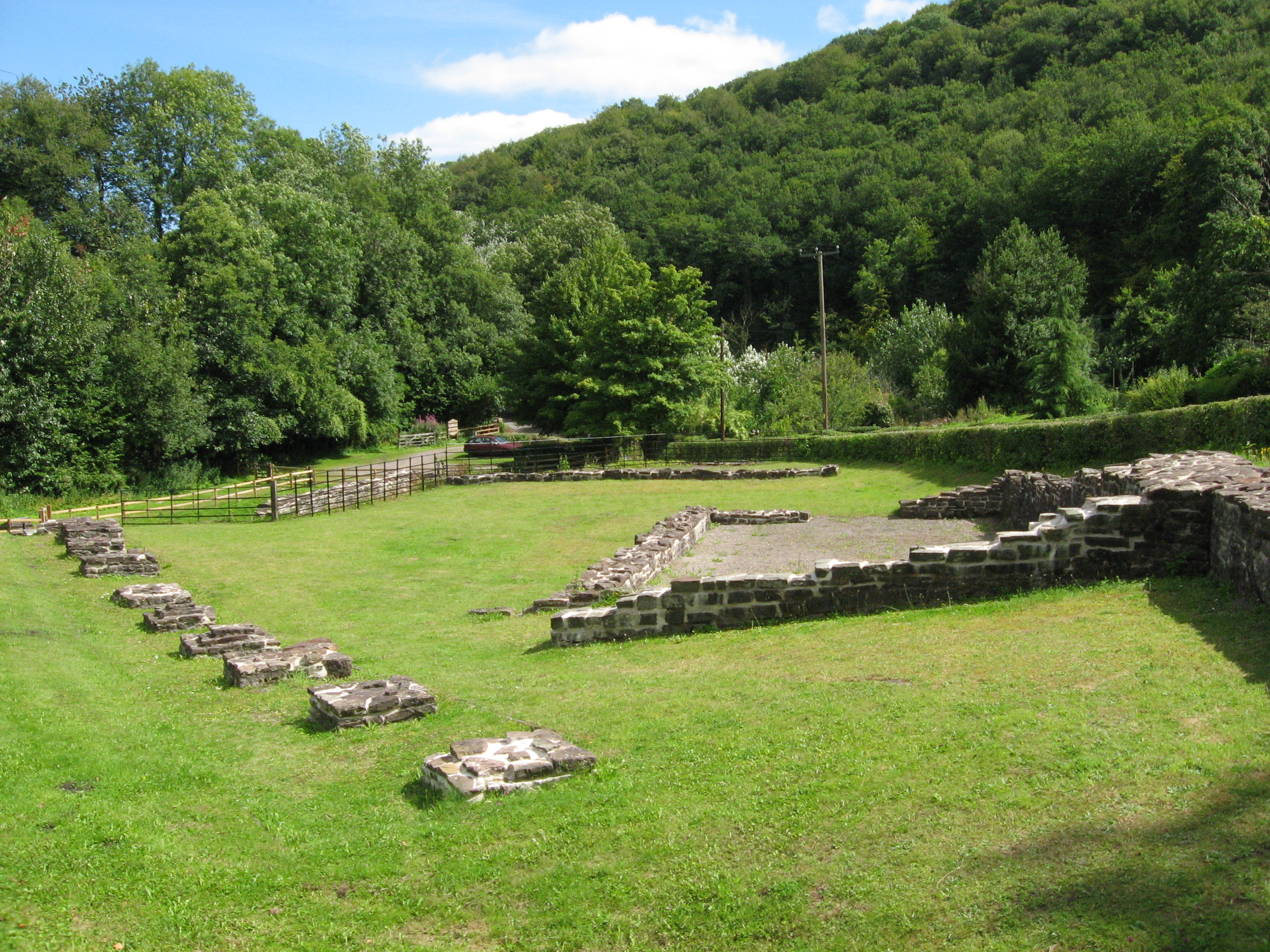
Part of the old ironworks site.

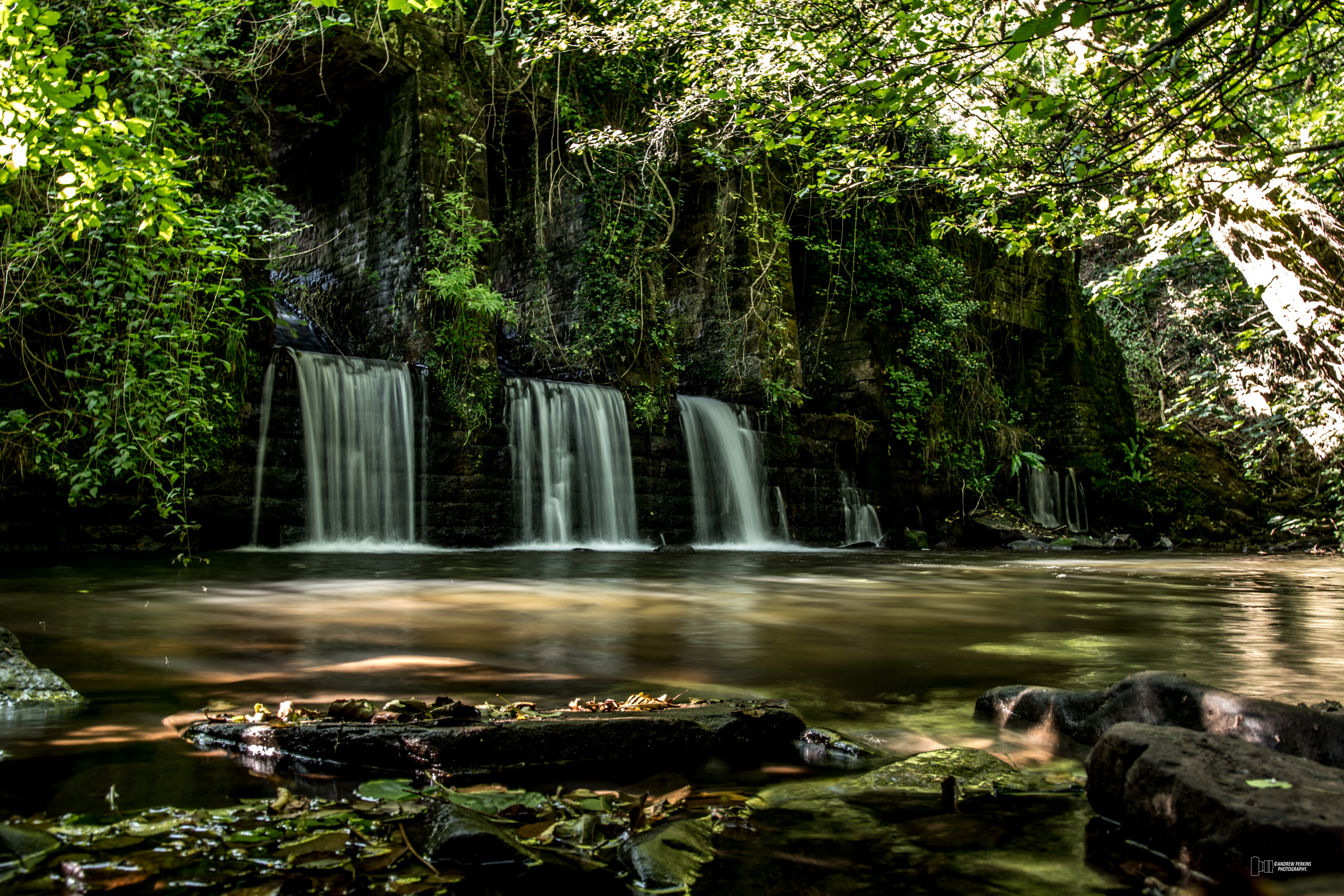
Dam and retaining wall for old wireworks.

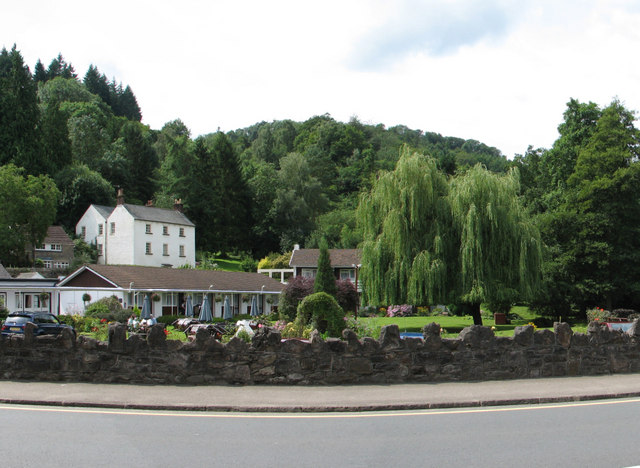
Looking up the Angidy valley from the A466. The Royal George hotel (1598) is at the left before the large white building, Crown Lodge (1800), both scheduled monuments.

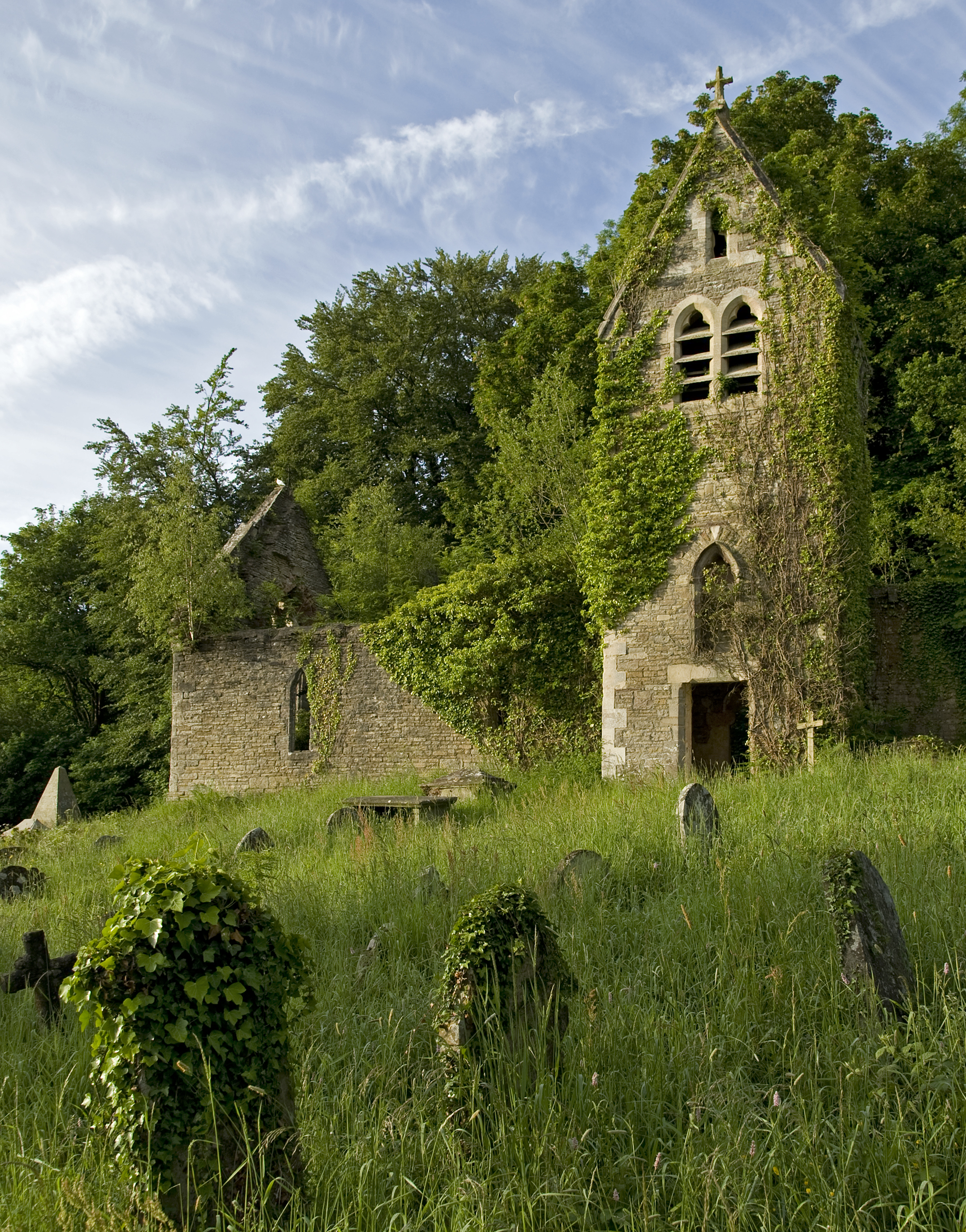
St. Mary's Church, resting place of many ironworkers.

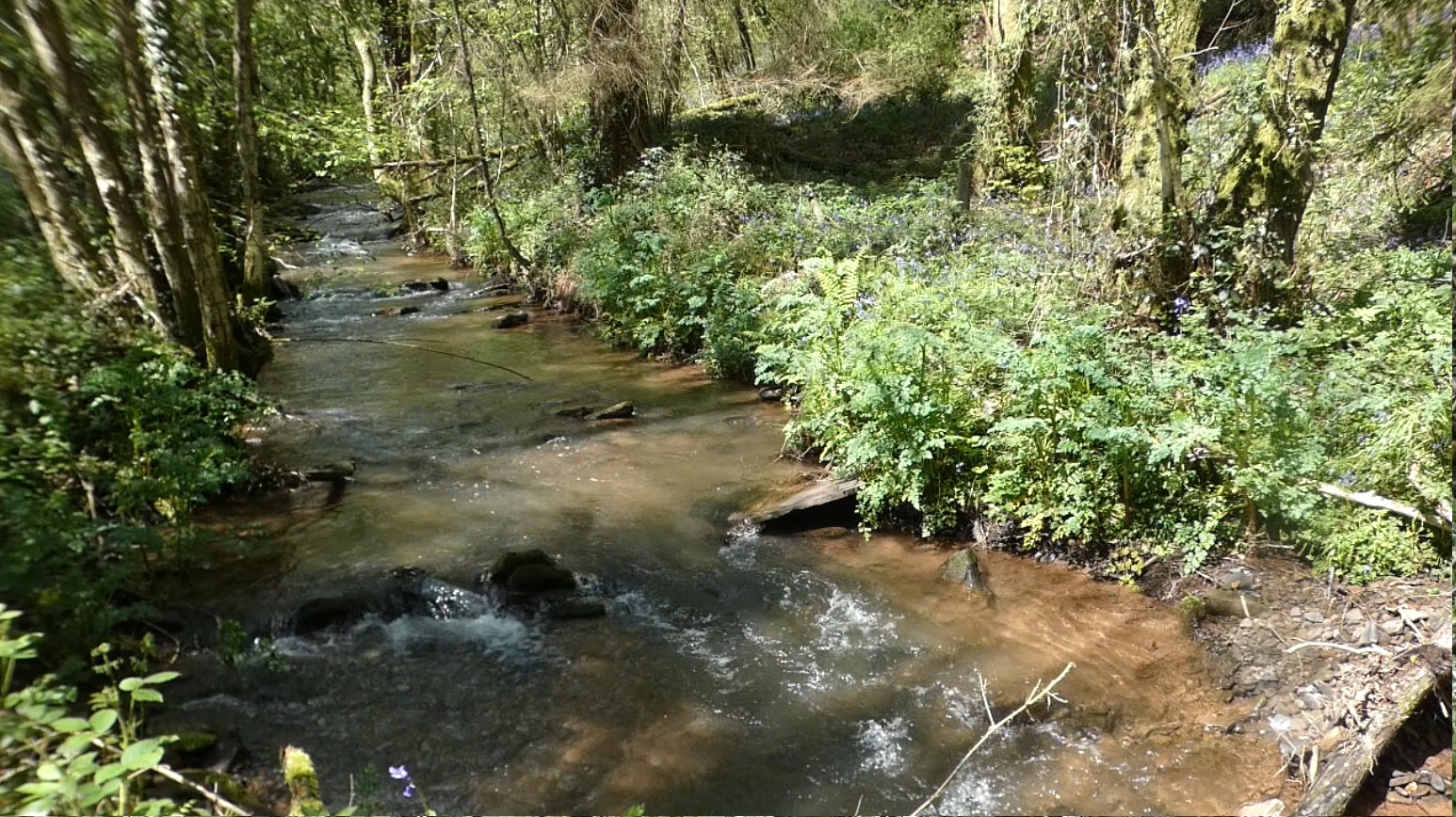
Anghidi Fawr coming northwards to Pontysaison near the road by Fedw Wood.

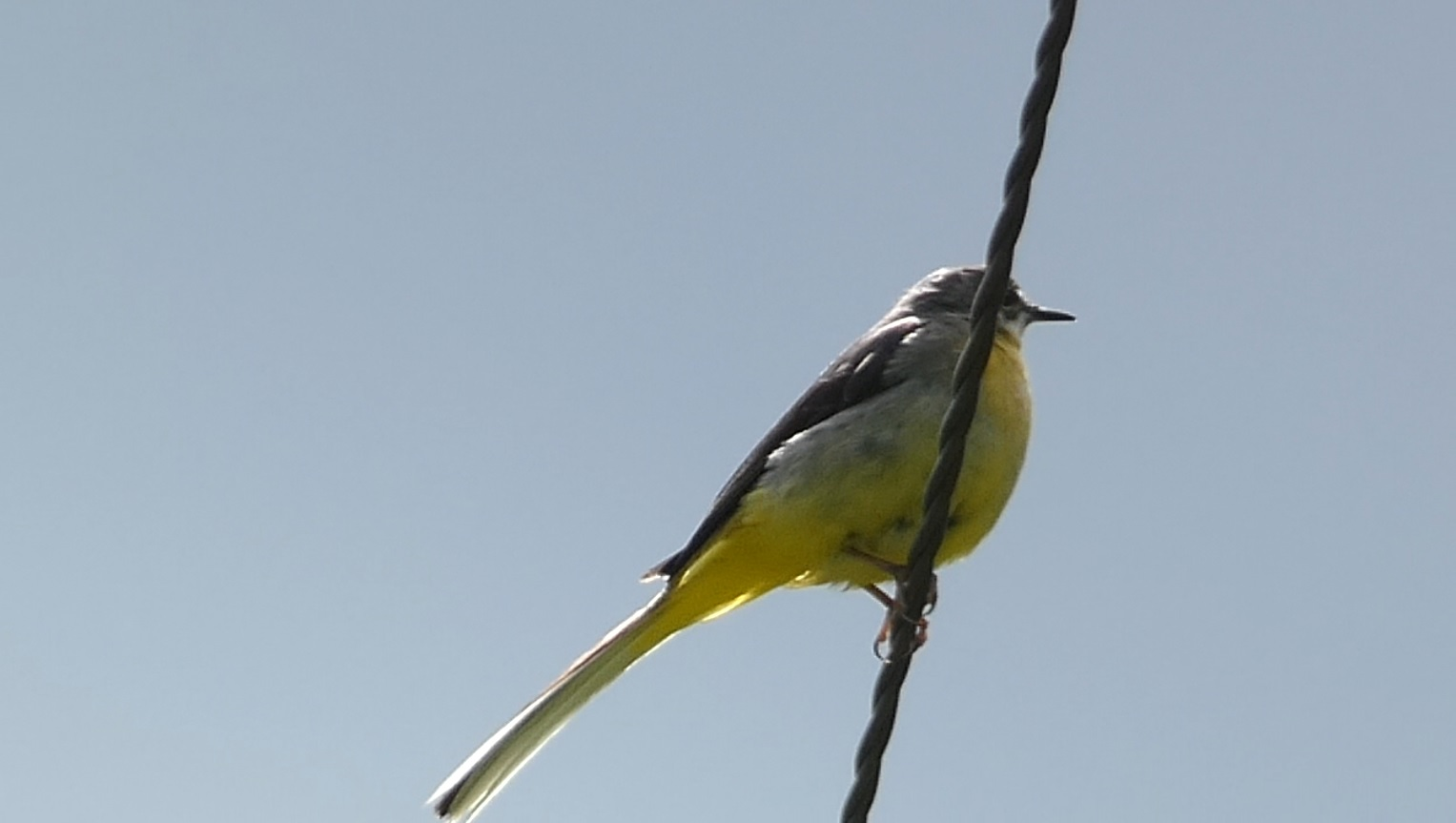
Grey wagtail on telephone line by the old blast furnace.

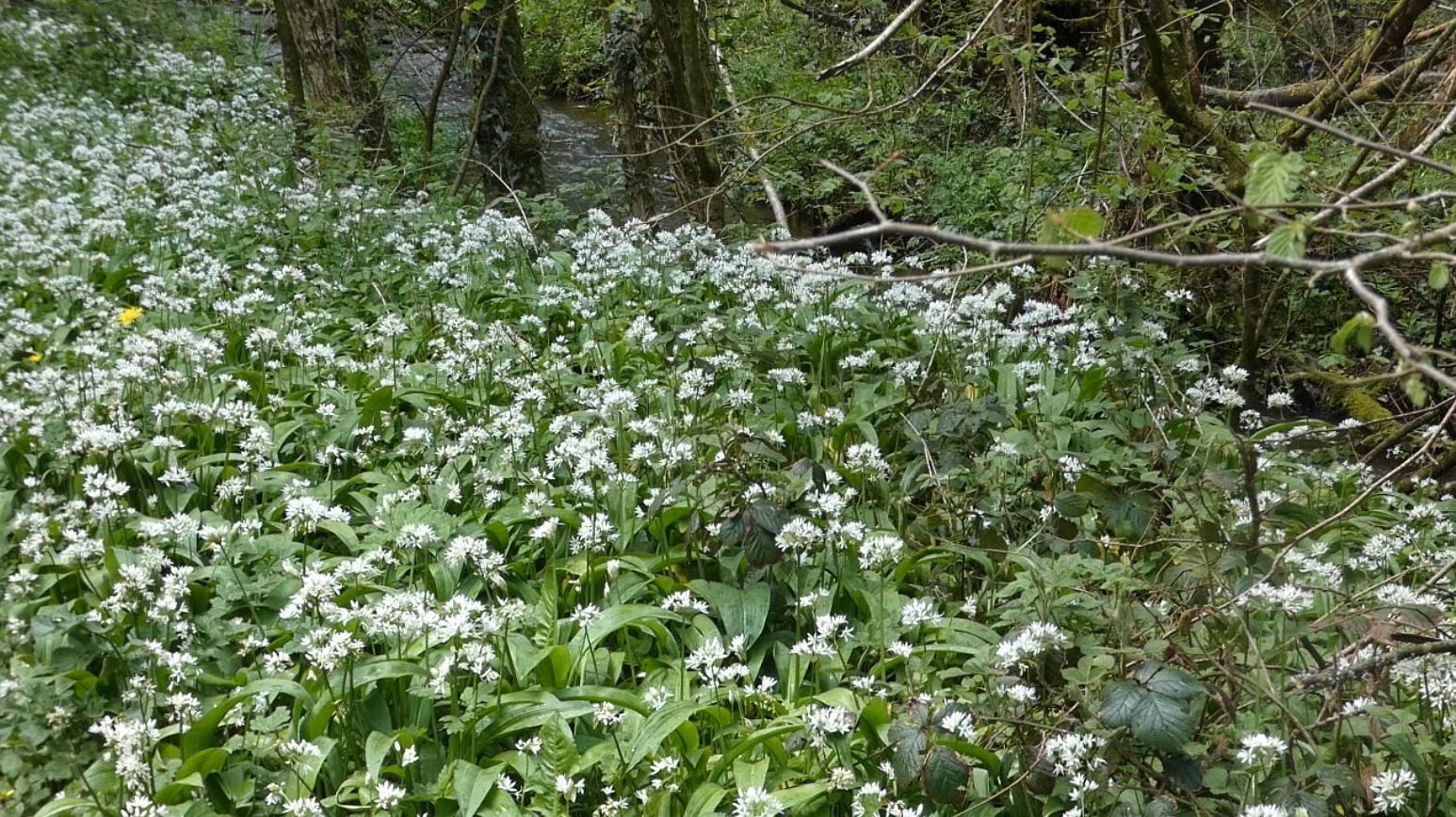
Bank of wild garlic by the Angidy near Fedw Wood.

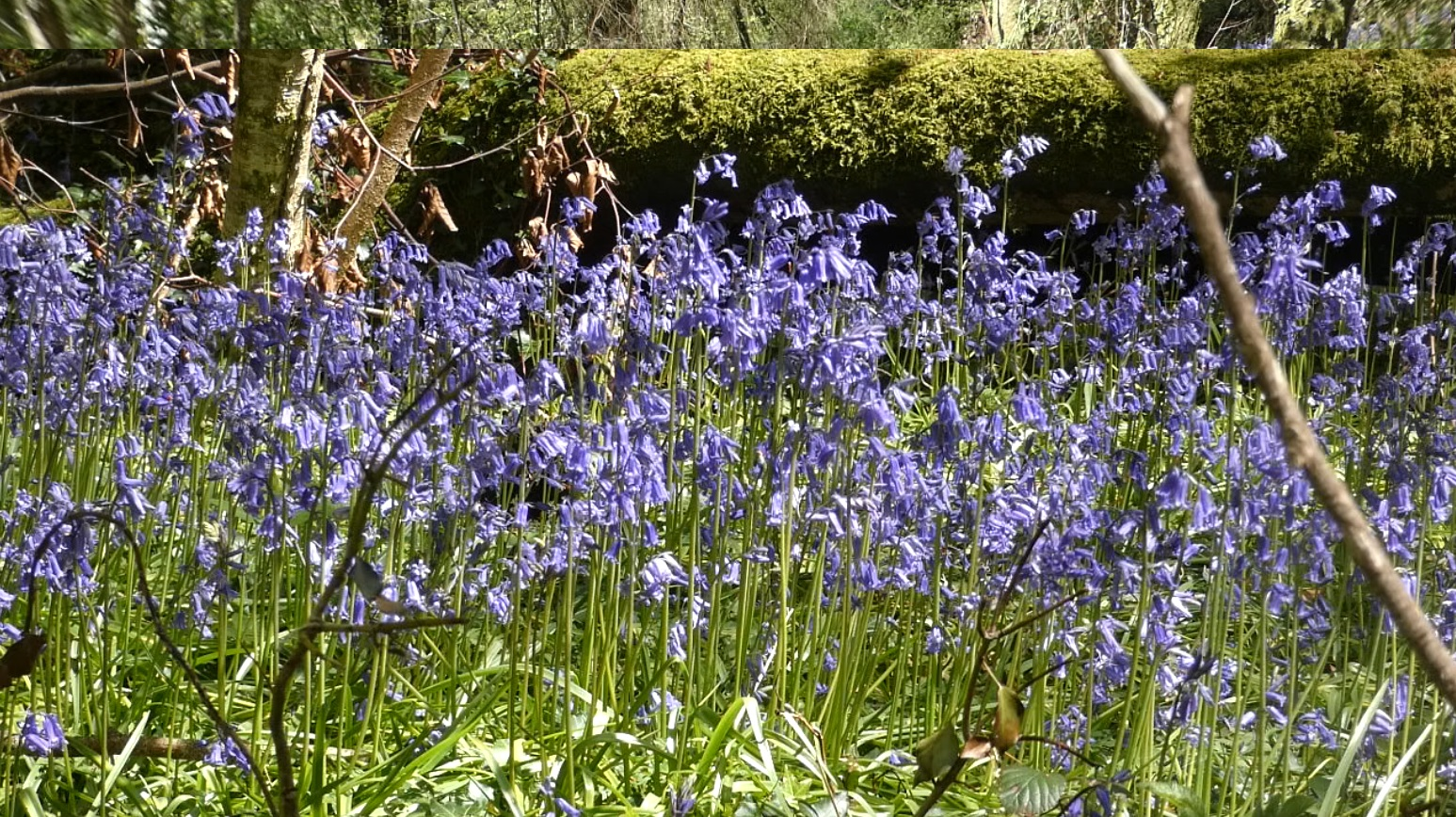
Bluebells by the Anghidi Fawr near Fedw Wood.

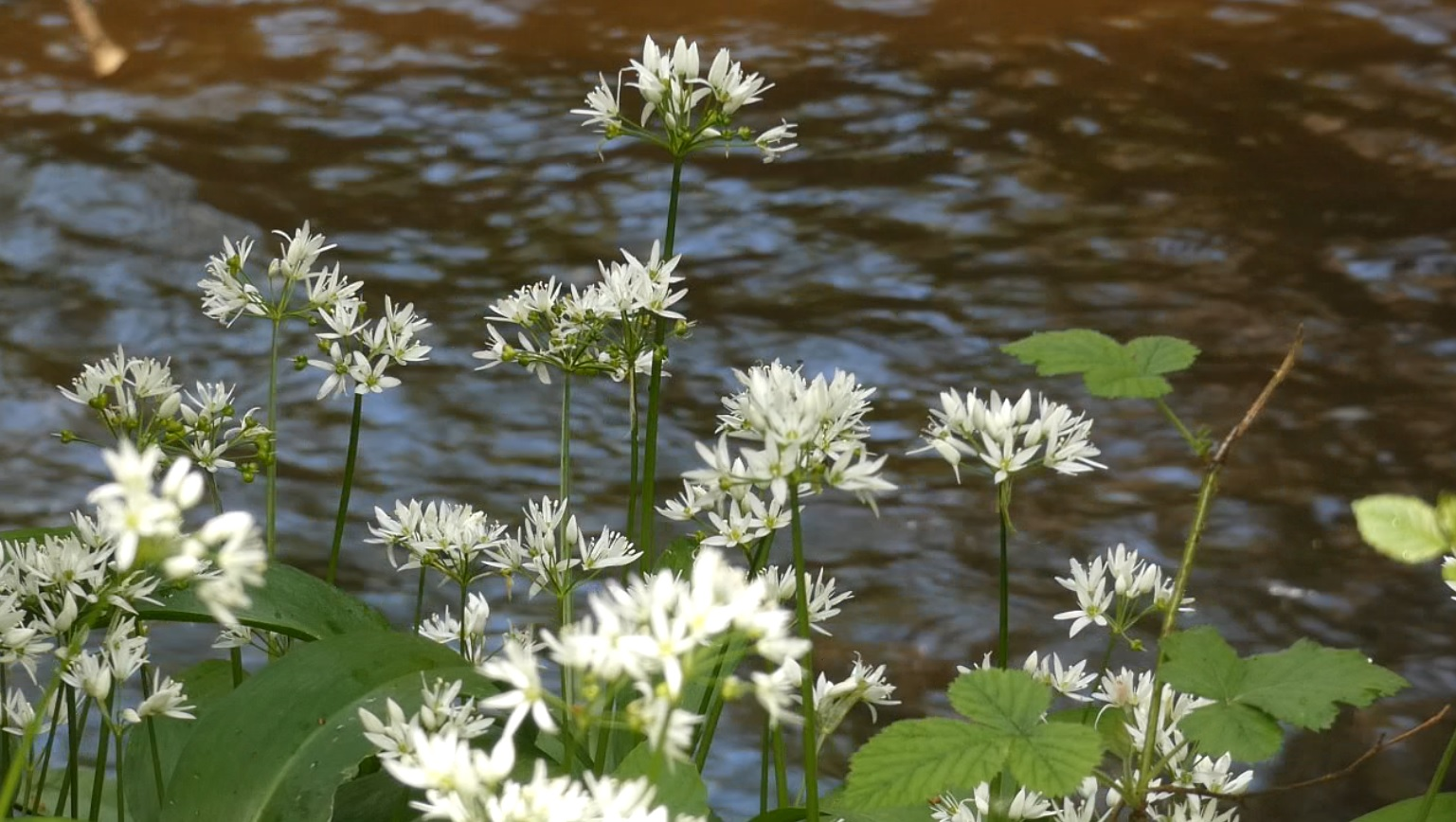
Wild garlic by the brook near Fedw Wood.
