= Tintern =

Village in Monmouthshire, Wales

Coordinates: 51.69677°N 2.68142°W

Tintern: Welsh: Tyndyrn
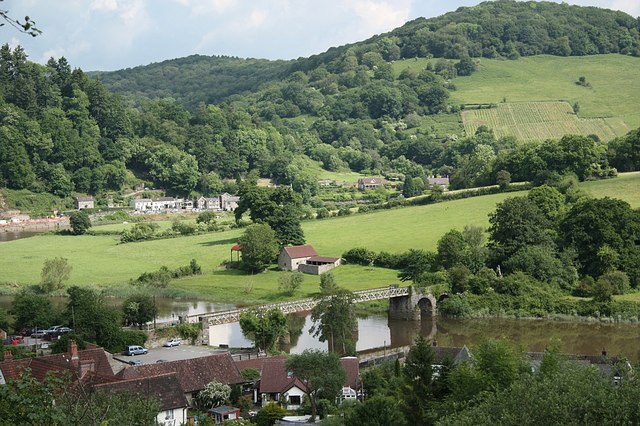
- Tintern, viewed from the south

- Location within Monmouthshire
- Population: 853 (2011)
- OS grid reference: SO530000
- Community: Wye Valley
- Principal area: Monmouthshire
- Preserved county: Gwent
- Country: Wales
- Sovereign state: United Kingdom
- Post town: CHEPSTOW
- Postcode district: NP16
- Dialling code: 01291
- Police: Gwent
- Fire: South Wales
- Ambulance: Welsh
- UK Parliament: Monmouth
- Senedd Cymru – Welsh Parliament: Monmouth

Tintern (Welsh: Tyndyrn) is a village in the community of Wye Valley, on the west bank of the River Wye in Monmouthshire, Wales, close to the border with England, about 5 miles (8 km) north of Chepstow. It is popular with tourists, in particular for the scenery and the ruined Tintern Abbey. Modern Tintern has been formed by the coalescence of two historic villages: Tintern Parva, forming the northern end of the village, and Chapel Hill, which forms the southern end. The village is designated as a Conservation Area.

In 2022 the community was renamed from "Tintern" to "Wye Valley" and had boundary changes.

== History ==
=== Early history ===
The name Tintern may derive from the Welsh din + d/teyrn, meaning "rocks of the king".

A ford, known as Tintern Ford, stretched across the tidal River Wye and was in use in Roman times. After the Romans withdrew from Wales, the kingdom of Gwent emerged, and, according to tradition, one of their 6th-century kings, Tewdrig, abdicated to become a hermit in Tintern. He came out of retirement to defeat the invading Saxons in battle: probably at Tintern ford, shown as a 6th-century battle site on Ordnance Survey records. Three cairns on a hillside 200 m and 1800 m above and to the west of the ford are known locally as "Devil's Lap Stones". There is a local tradition that they are burial mounds of soldiers killed in a battle in the vicinity. Although the distance and height difference between the ford and cairns is considerable, it is possible that there may be a connection between the two sites. Local legend also suggests a battle site at Pont y Saison — Welsh for Bridge of the Saxons or English – in the Angiddy Valley but the name is more likely to refer to the architect of the stone bridge.

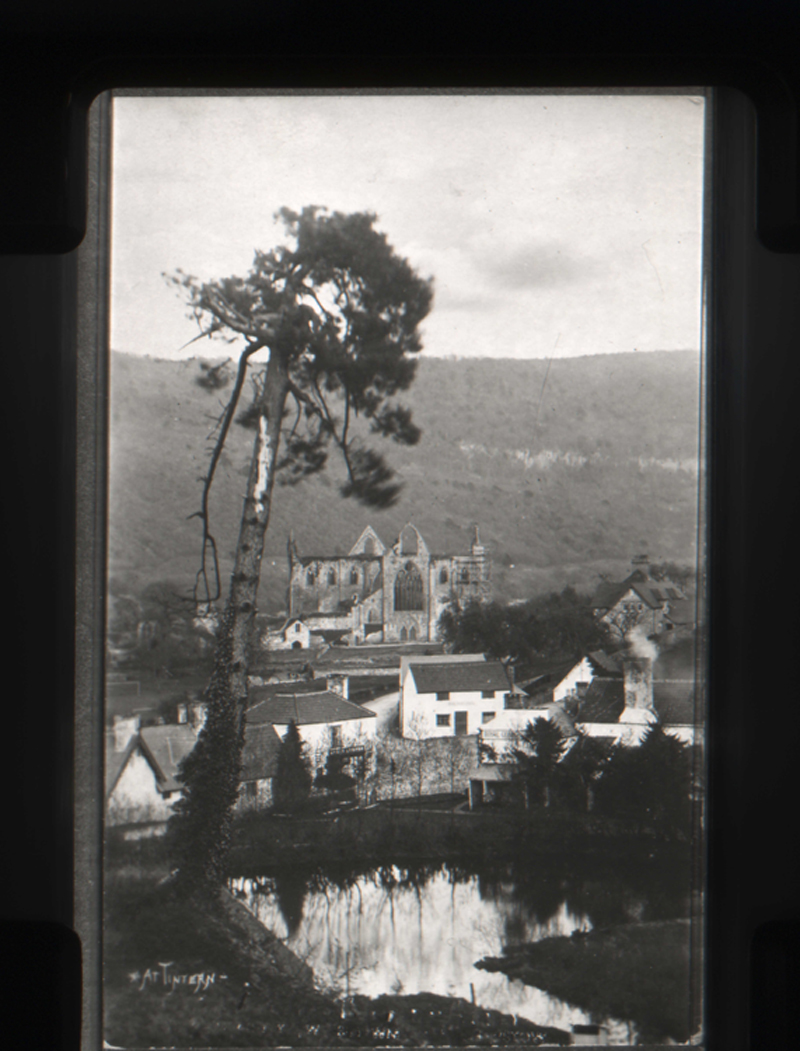
Tintern village c. 1914

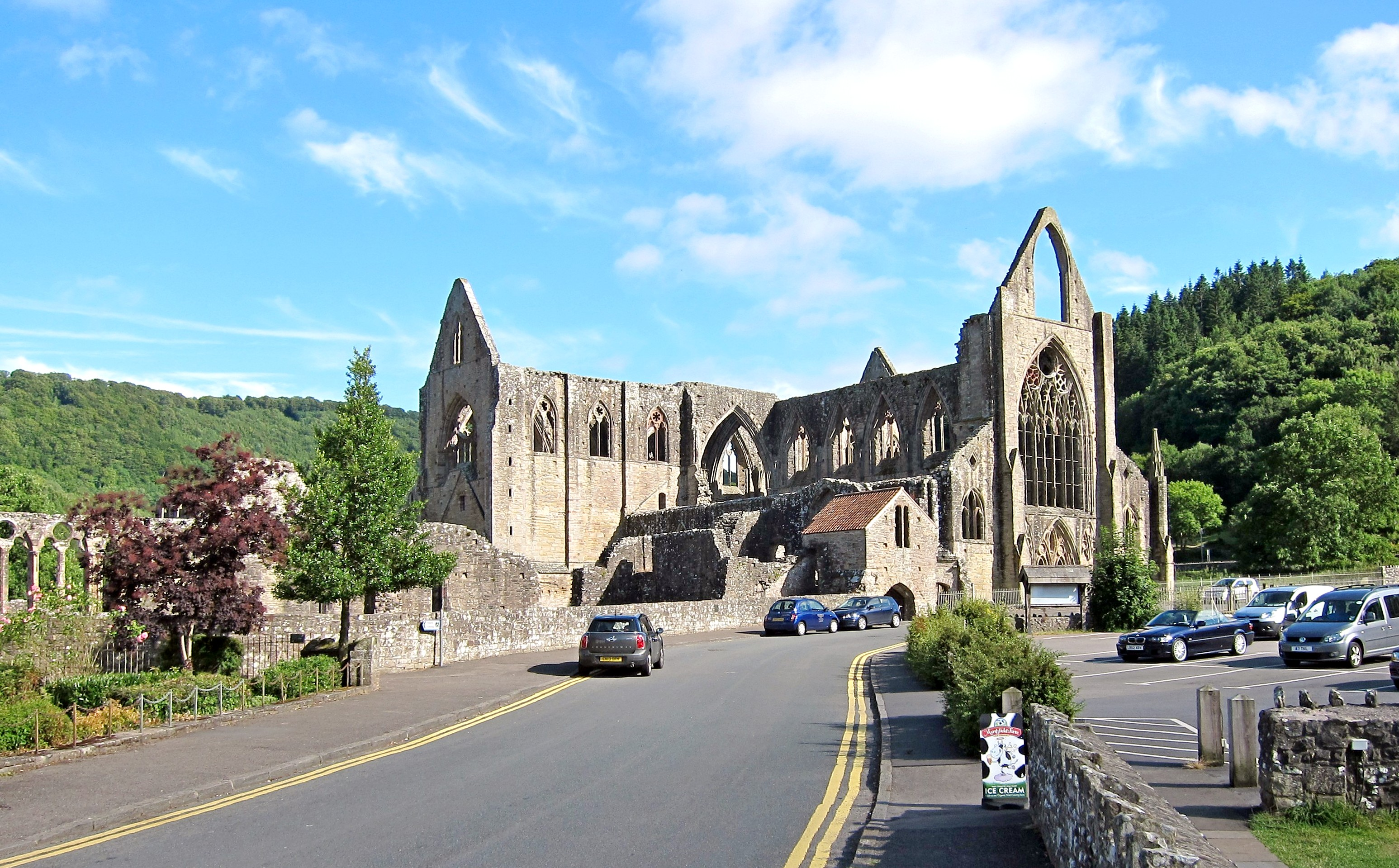
Tintern Abbey from the road

=== The abbey ===
Tintern Abbey was founded beside the river by Walter de Clare on 9 May 1131, during the reign of King Henry I. It was the second Cistercian foundation in Britain, and its monks came from a daughter house of Cîteaux in France.

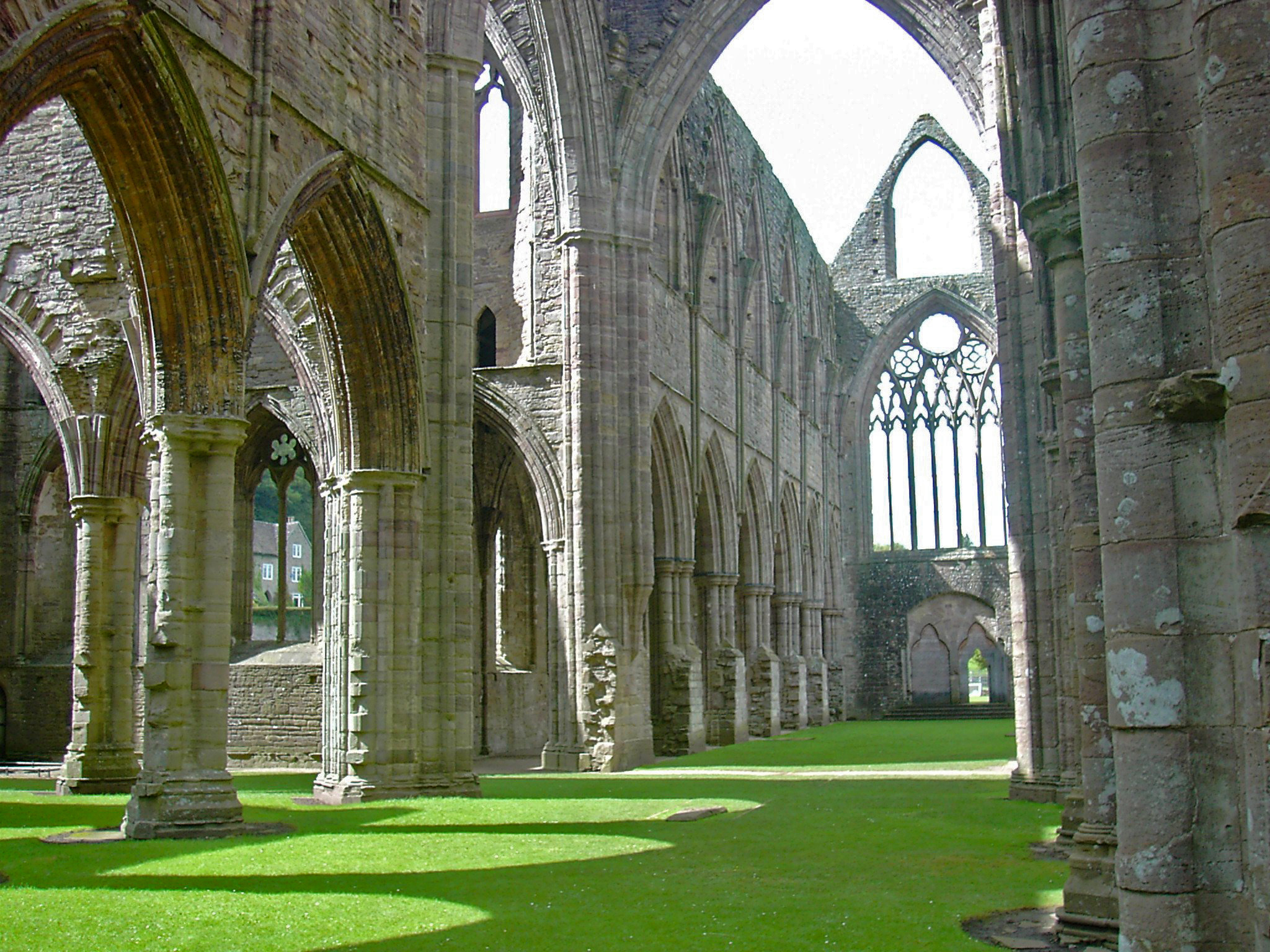
Tintern Abbey interior

The present-day remains at Tintern are a mixture of building works covering several centuries. Between 1270 and 1301 the abbey was rebuilt, and when it was completed around four hundred monks lived in the complex. The abbey's land was divided into agricultural units or granges, and local people provided farm labour and served the abbey and its many visitors. For 400 years, it dominated the economy of its surrounding area. During some of this period the area was contested between the Welsh and English, the closest battle being won in 1404 by Owain Glyndŵr, at Craig y Dorth near Monmouth. The area also had to contend with the Black Death, and it is suspected that the neighbouring village of Penterry disappeared at that time. The abbey remained in operation until the Dissolution of the Monasteries in 1536.

=== Brass, iron and wire works ===
It has been suggested that the monks or lay brethren of Tintern Abbey exploited the woodlands and river power for operating iron forges, but evidence of this is lacking. Industrial activity began in 1568 when the newly-established Company of Mineral and Battery Works built a wireworks. It is possible that brass was made, but the works mainly made iron wire. This was used to produce a wide variety of goods: cards for the woollen industry, nails, pins, knitting needles and fish hooks. The site was convenient, because the Wye allowed transport, the Angiddy stream provided water power, trees in nearby woods were used for charcoal fuel, and the locality provided a ready supply of minerals. The company began letting their works. Farmers of the works in the 17th century included Sir Basil Brooke, Thomas Foley, the important ironmaster and his son Thomas Foley. A blast furnace and forges were built in the valley in the 17th century and operated with the wireworks until the end of the 19th century.

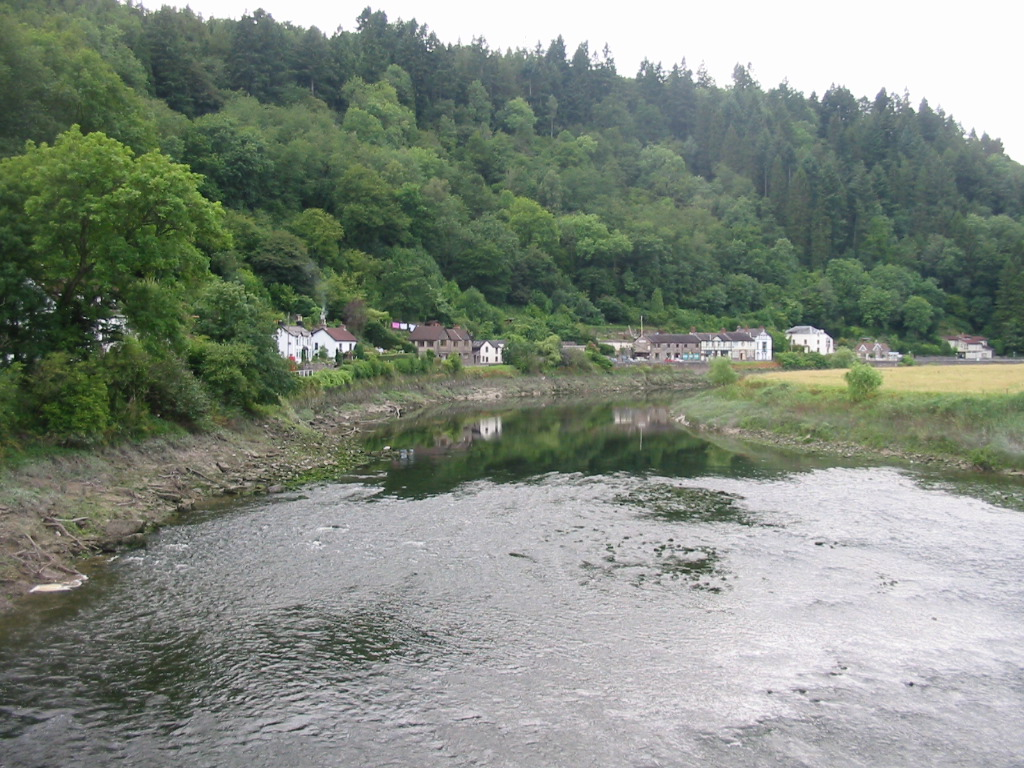
River Wye and Tintern Parva

For 300 years, the numerous works and forges along the Angidy Valley dominated the village and surrounding communities. A branch from the Wye Valley Railway to the Lower Wireworks by way of a bridge (the 'Wireworks Bridge') was completed in 1875, but this was too late to stop them going out of business. In 1878 a new company leased the site to manufacture tinplate, but by 1895 it was reported as closed and only some ruins, associated ponds, leats and culverts are now visible. The bridge was used in the early 20th century for a horse-drawn tramway and now carries a tourist footpath to the opposite bank. In March 2021, discovery of an underground structure paralleling Angiddy Brook was initially thought to be a "secret medieval tunnel system". Subsequent investigation identified the structure as an original leat system for one of the "missing" mills associated with Tintern Abbey.

=== The tourist industry ===
By the late 18th century, tourism had started in the Wye Valley, with many visitors travelling on the river to see the abbey and other "picturesque" sites in the area. William Wordsworth stayed in the village in 1798 and wrote Lines Written a Few Miles above Tintern Abbey. The completion of the turnpike road (now the A466) in the valley in 1829, and the arrival of the Wye Valley Railway in the 1870s, greatly increased the number of visitors, and tourism became the mainstay of Tintern's economy and remains so today. The grade II listed Wild Hare Inn, formerly the Royal George Hotel, was established soon after the turnpike road opened.

== Areas of interest ==
=== Tintern Abbey ===
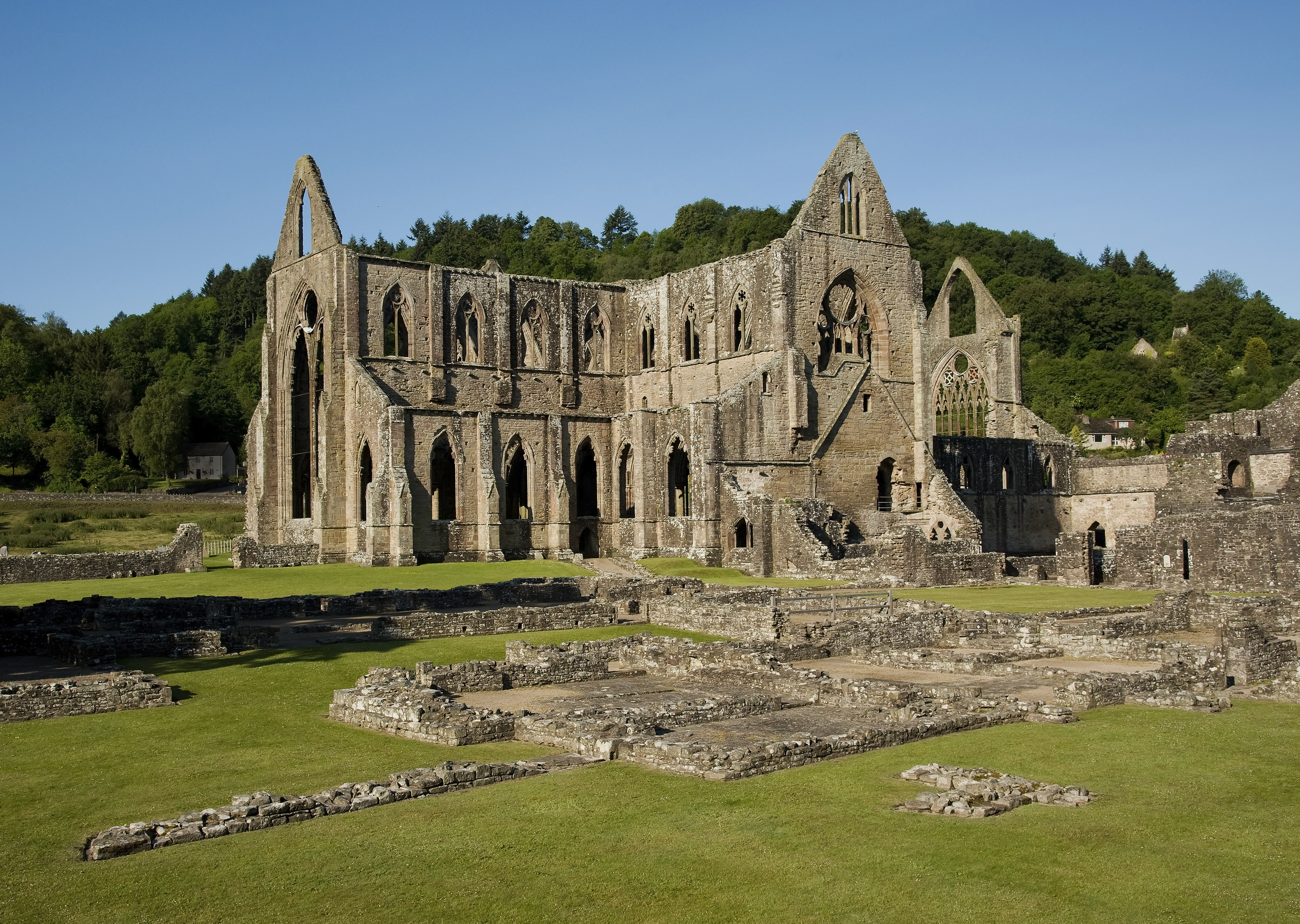
Tintern Abbey

Tintern Abbey was founded on 9 May 1131 by Walter de Clare, Lord of Chepstow. It was the first Cistercian foundation in Wales, and only the second in Britain (after Waverley Abbey).

The abbey fell into ruin after the Dissolution of the Monasteries in the 16th century. Its remains have been celebrated in poetry and painting from the 18th century onwards. In 1984, Cadw took over responsibility for managing the site. Tintern Abbey is visited by approximately 70,000 people every year.

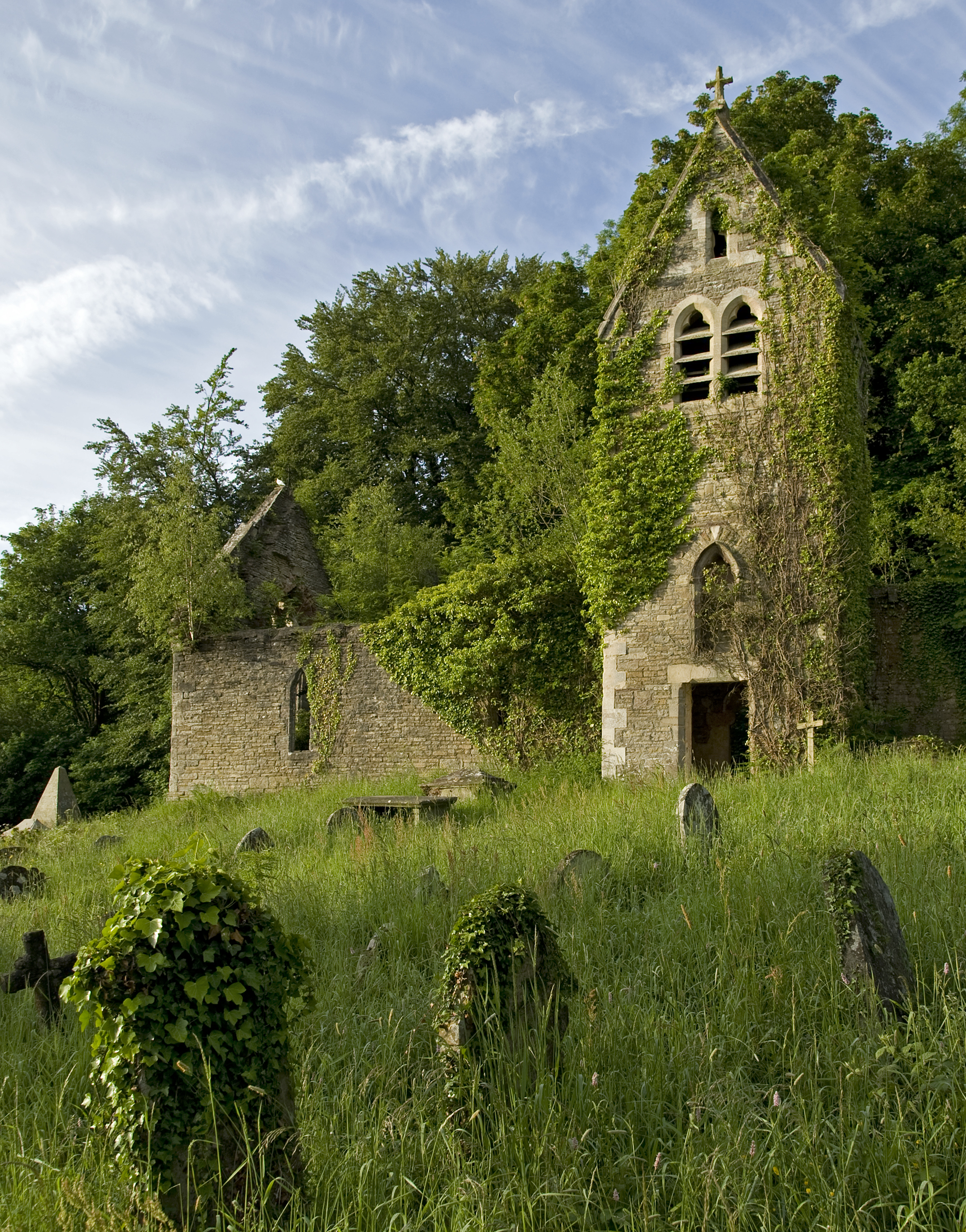
St Mary the Virgin on Chapel Hill

=== St Mary the Virgin on Chapel Hill ===
Medieval in origin, it is believed that the chapel was founded for workers building Tintern Abbey, but the Chapel Hill site was, according to historian Sir Joseph Bradney, previously dedicated to 5th-century Welsh saint St Andras. The church was restored over 1863-68 by John Prichard. A Grade II listing was awarded in 1971 in recognition of Prichard's work. St Mary's reredos has been transferred to nearby St Michael's Church for safe-keeping, but interesting architectural features include the following: medieval stonework concentrated at the east end; 14th- and 15th-century tracery; undated but pre-Victorian stonework such as the stoup, niche, piscina and unusual saddleback stone-tiled tower. Victorian features are limited to the expanded vestry and south wall.

Also Grade II and listed in the surrounding area: the neoclassical monument to J S Brown (d. 1840), a rare 18th or 19th century pyramid tomb, an 18th or 19th century Neoclassical or Baroque sarcophagus tomb of Richard White (d. 1765), and the revetment wall and adjoining paved road leading up to the churchyard. Other monuments of interest include one to Peter Carr who died in the 1913 Senghenydd colliery disaster and a war grave of Private BB Hall, an American citizen who enlisted in the Lancashire Fusiliers and died at Connaught.

The church is privately owned. The working churchyard is owned by the Church in Wales and is maintained by volunteers.

=== Water Mill ===
A disused water-driven mill lies in the Abbey Mill area northwest of the abbey. Visitor information and shops can be found close by.

=== Parva Farm Vineyard ===
The village also has an award-winning vineyard.

=== The Moon and Sixpence ===
The former public house, The Moon and Sixpence, was originally known as the Mason's Arms, but changed its name in 1948 following a visit by Somerset Maugham, author of the 1919 novel of the same name. It has been converted into a group of three private houses.

=== St Michael's Church, Tintern Parva ===
The church of St Michael, Tintern Parva dates back to medieval times: a church on the site was recorded around 1348. It was substantially rebuilt in 1846 (although pictorial records suggest it was relatively similar in appearance before and after the rebuilding) and has remained largely unchanged since. The south porch may date to the 15th century. The churchyard includes various 19th-century memorials, including one for John Loraine Baldwin, former warden of the abbey. The church is also the final resting place of Heather the last victim of serial killer Fred West..

=== Old railway station ===
Tintern railway station was on the former Wye Valley Railway. From the north, approaching Tintern, immediately after Tintern Station the railway crossed the Wye to bypass the village on the other bank. Closed to passengers in 1959, the station, a mile's walk above Tintern, functions as a tourist centre.

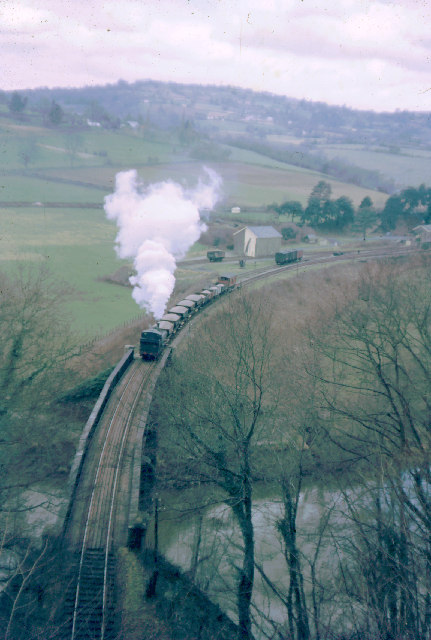
Stone train departing Tintern and crossing the River Wye heading for Chepstow (1963)

=== Walks ===
Tintern is home to an extensive network of local footpaths, linking with two long-distance paths: On the Welsh side, the Wye Valley Walk passes nearby, and on the English side, the Offa's Dyke path is also near. The former wireworks railway bridge north of the abbey crosses the River Wye, and is open to the public. It leads, on the English side of the river, to several clearly marked walking paths, most notably a path to the "Devil's Pulpit", and other paths which also lead to Offa's Dyke.

=== Football ===
Tintern Abbey Football Club plays in Division 1 of the East Gwent League. Home matches are played on the Leytons field in Tintern, The club is known for having one of the most picturesque views in Welsh and world football.
