= List of Sites of Special Scientific Interest in Monmouthshire =

Map of Monmouthshire within Wales

This is a list of the Sites of Special Scientific Interest (SSSIs) in Monmouthshire.

== Sites ==
- Barbadoes Hill Meadows
- Blackcliff-Wyndcliff
- Blaentrothy Meadows
- Blorenge
- Brockwells Meadows
- Brook Cottage, Llangibby
- Bushy Close
- Caeau Fferm
- Caer Llan Wood
- Cilwrgi Quarry
- Cleddon Bog
- Cleddon Shoots Woodland
- Cobbler's Plain Meadows, Devauden
- Coed-y-Cerrig National Nature Reserve
- Coed-y-Person
- Coombe Valley Woods
- Croes Robert Wood
- Cwm Clydach
- Cwm Llanwenarth Meadows
- Cwm Mill Section, Mardy
- Cwm-Ton, Glascoed
- Dinham Meadows
- Fiddlers Elbow
- Foxwood
- Gaer House Woods
- Gaer Wood, Llangoven
- Gilwern Hill
- Golden Hill Quarry, Devauden
- Graig Wood
- Gwent Levels - Magor and Undy
- Gwent Levels - Redwick and Llandevenny
- Harper's Grove – Lord's Grove
- Livox Wood
- Llandegveth Reservoir
- Llanfihangel Moraine
- Llangovan Church
- Llanover Quarry
- Llwyn y Celyn Wetland
- Lower Ground, Penrhos
- Lower Hael Wood
- Lower Nex Meadows, Devauden
- Maes-yr-Uchaf Wood
- Magor Marsh
- Mwyngloddfa Mynydd-Bach
- Mynydd Llangatwg (Llangattock Mountain)
- Nedern Brook Wetlands, Caldicot
- Newton Court Stable Block
- Park House Wood
- Penarth Brook Woodlands
- Penhow Woodlands
- Penpergwm Pond
- Pentwyn Farm Grasslands, Penallt
- Pierce, Alcove and Piercefield Woods, Piercefield Park
- Plantation Farm and the Gethley
- Priory Wood
- Rectory Meadow, Rogiet
- Lower River Usk
- Upper River Usk
- River Usk (Tributaries) (Afon Wysg (Isafonydd))
- Severn Estuary
- Siambre Ddu
- Strawberry Cottage Wood
- Sugar Loaf Woodlands
- Lower Wye Gorge SSSI
- Upper Wye Gorge
- Wye Valley Lesser Horseshoe Bat Site

== See also ==
- List of SSSIs by Area of Search
