= St Mary's Church, Magor =

St Mary's, Magor
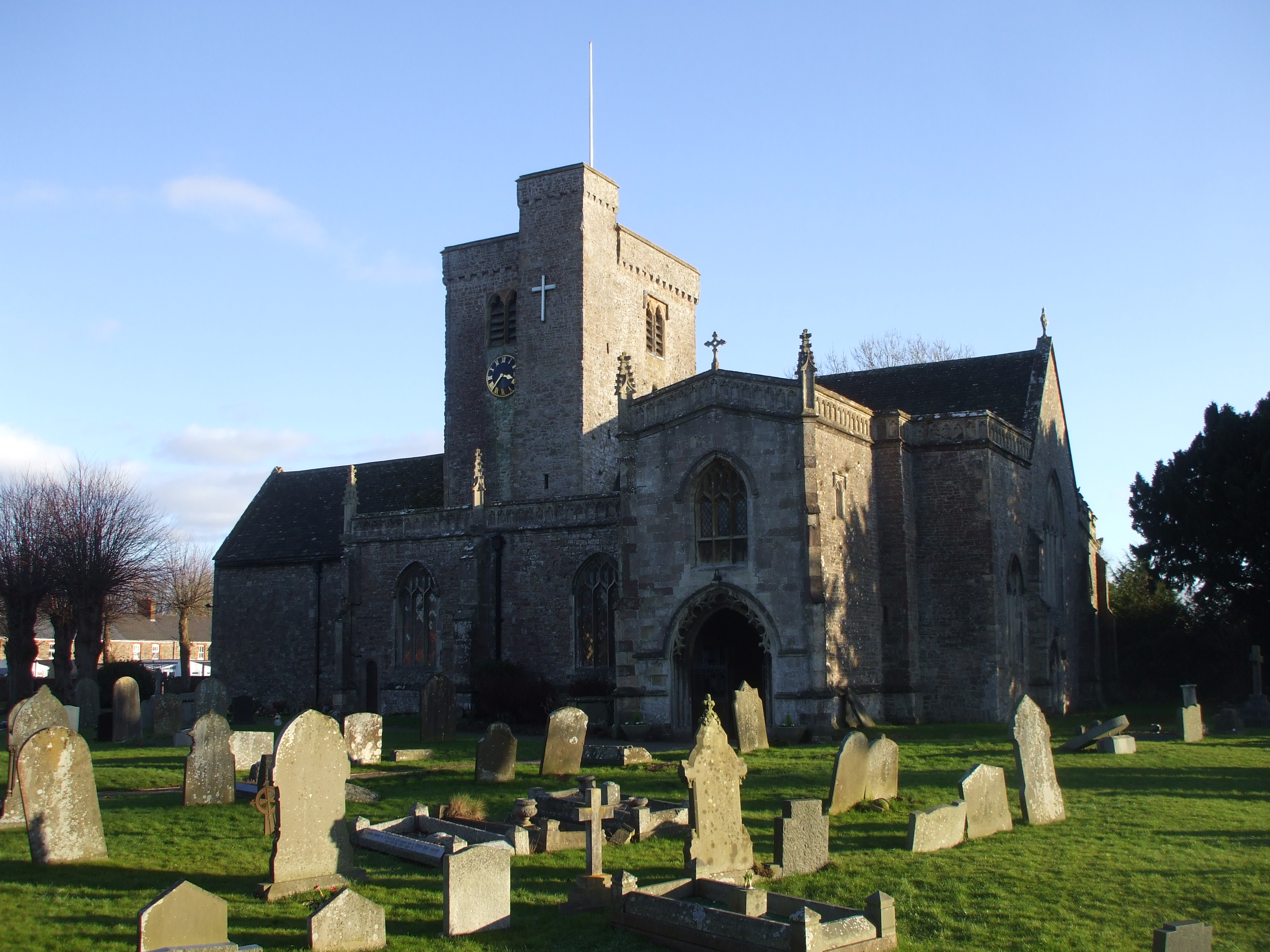
- St Mary's, Magor
- St Mary's, Magor
- 51.5788°N 2.8307°W
- Location: Magor, Monmouthshire
- Country: Wales
- Denomination: Church in Wales
- Website: magorministryarea.org.uk

Architecture
- Years built: late 13th century

Administration
- Diocese: Monmouth

Clergy
- Rector: Rev Daniel Frett

The Church of St Mary stands in the centre of the village of Magor, Monmouthshire, Wales. It was designated a Grade I listed building in 1963. The church is the lead church of the Netherwent Ministry Area, led by Rev Daniel Frett, which administers to a population of around 32,000.

== History and architecture ==
It is possible that the church was originally dedicated to Cadwaladr, the last Welsh ruler to call himself King of Britain, who died of the plague in 664 AD. The church was subsequently dedicated to St Leonard, until the mid-nineteenth century restoration, when it was rededicated to St Mary.

John Newman, in his 2000 Gwent/Monmouthshire volume of the Pevsner Buildings of Wales series, describes St Mary's as "one of the most ambitious churches in the county, though the ambitions were not all realised." It is in the Decorated style with a prominent, integral, tower. The porch, of the fourteenth/fifteenth centuries, has buttresses which display "ferocious gargoyles and pinnacles."

The interior contains nineteenth-century, stained glass, including The Good Shepherd by Kempe & Co of 1930–31. The churchyard is the burial place of Welsh composer Mansel Thomas (1909–1986).

Next to the church stands The Procurator's House, a sixteenth-century house, now ruined, which belonged to the vicarage of Magor.

== Sources ==
- Newman, John (2000). Gwent/Monmouthshire. The Buildings of Wales. London: Penguin. ISBN 0-14-071053-1.
