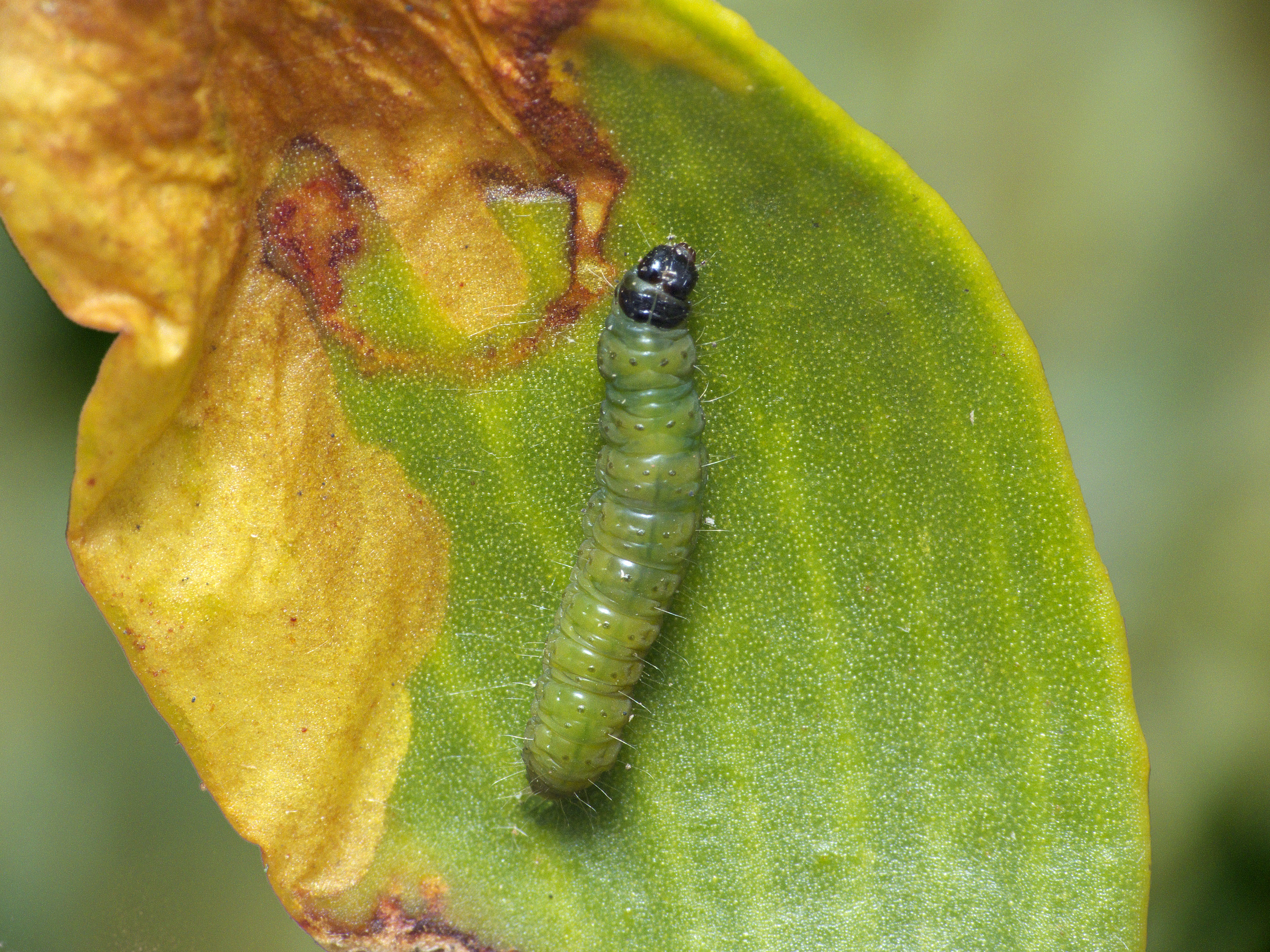

Scientific classification
- Domain: Eukaryota
- Kingdom: Animalia
- Phylum: Arthropoda
- Class: Insecta
- Order: Lepidoptera
- Family: Tortricidae
- Genus: Celypha
- Species: C. woodiana

Binomial name
- Celypha woodiana (Barrett, 1882)

Synonyms
- Brachytaenia woodiana Barrett, 1882

= Celypha woodiana =

Mistletoe marble

Species of moth

Celypha woodiana also known as the mistletoe marble is a moth of the family Tortricidae found in Europe. In Great Britain the moth is a priority species in the United Kingdom Biodiversity Action Plan. The species was described by Charles Golding Barrett who named it in honour of John Henry Wood.

== Description ==
Wingspan c. 17mm. The moths fly in July and August and can be found resting on tree trunks during the day. They also come to light.

Ova

Eggs can be found on mistletoe (Viscum album) in September and October.

Larva

Larvae can be found from September to May in a mine. The initial mine is inconspicuous as a brown, narrow, lower-surface corridor and the larva can leave the mine and start a new one elsewhere. In April and May the larva make a full depth transparent blotch with most of the frass ejected. The mines can be difficult to find as the leaf falls from the plant.

Pupa

Larvae pupate in June, in a loose cocoon amongst lichens or under the bark of the host tree.

== Distribution and habitat ==
The moth is found from Great Britain to Ukraine but is absent in some countries, including the Netherlands, Portugal and Spain.

In England the moth has been found in the following counties; Gloucestershire, Herefordshire, Somerset, Warwickshire and Worcestershire. The moth was found in Wales for the first time in 2019 with leaf mines and a larva at Magor Marsh (Welsh: Cors Magwyr), a Gwent Wildlife Trust nature reserve. It is rare and mostly confined to mature apple (Malus spp) orchards in southern England and the south Midlands. Mistletoe on hawthorn (Crataegus spp) is the next preferred host tree and it has also been found on pear (Pyrus communis), crack willow (Salix fragilis) and rowan (Sorbus aucuparia) which has been planted. The moth seems to prefer succulent specimens and is able to survive on isolated clumps of mistletoe.

== Conservation ==
In Great Britain the moth is subject to a Biodiversity action plan (UK BAP species). Traditional orchards which are a UK Biodiversity Action Plan Priority habitat and the preferred habitat of the moth are in decline. Known and potential sites should be protected.
