= The Procurator's House, Magor =

The Procurator's House
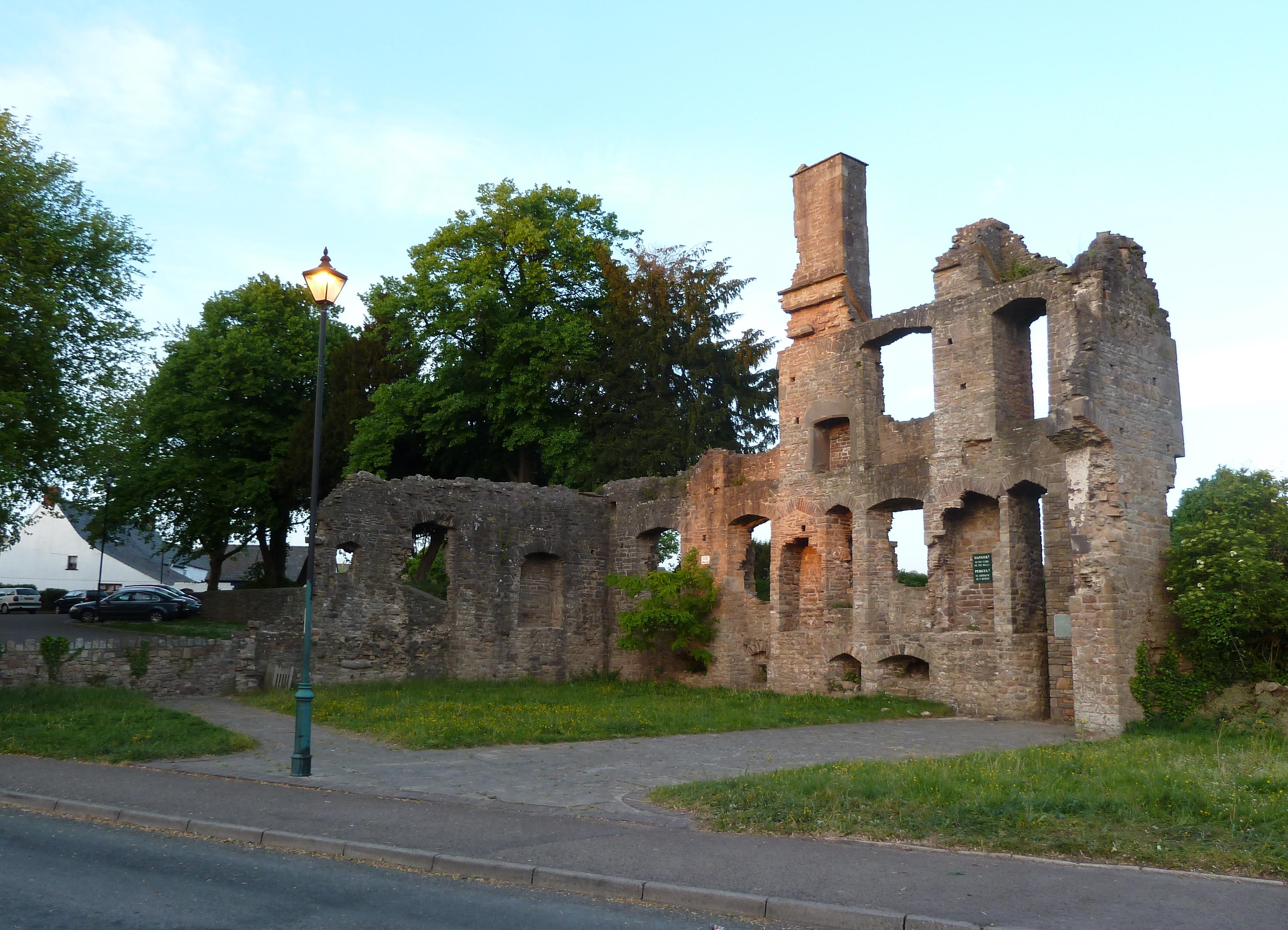

- Location within Monmouthshire
- 51.579°N 2.83141°W
- Type: Ruin
- Location: Magor, Monmouthshire, Wales

Scheduled monument
- Official name: The Procurator's House, also known as Magor Mansion
- Reference no.: MM180

Listed Building – Grade II*
- Designated: 31 May 1995
- Reference no.: 16064

The Procurator's House in Magor, Monmouthshire, Wales, is a large, ruined mansion of the sixteenth-century, standing next to St Mary's Church in the centre of the village. Although of ecclesiastical origin, it is unlikely the present house was ever occupied by a Procurator, who was a church official responsible for the collection of tithes. The lands owned by the Church of St Mary were controlled by the Abbey of Anagni, in Italy, in the Middle Ages and it is possible that an earlier building on the same site housed the abbey's procurator. The current building post-dates ownership by the abbey, and was constructed when the avowson of St Mary's was controlled by Tintern Abbey. The building is mentioned in a document of 1585, when it is referred to as "the mansion house belonging to the vicarage of Magor." This accounts for the two alternative names for the ruin, Magor Mansion and The Church House.

The building or, more accurately, its site, is one of only two examples of such procurators' houses known in Britain. Now completely ruined, the current house was constructed c.1500–1550. It is both a Scheduled Monument and a Grade II* listed building.

== History ==
During the thirteenth century, the Abbey of Anagni had become wealthy and powerful, producing four Popes within 100 years. In 1238, during the reign of Pope Gregory IX, who was born in Anagni, the church of St Mary's, Magor, and its associated lands, came under control of the abbey and remained its responsibility until 1385. The church was donated to the abbey by Gilbert Marshal, 4th Earl of Pembroke and Lord of Chepstow During that time, it is possible that a house was constructed for the abbey's procurator on the site of the present building. In 1385, the church and tithes were leased, and subsequently permanently acquired, by the Cistercian Order of monks located at Tintern Abbey The current building was constructed at some point in the early to mid-sixteen century and is referenced as a"mansion belonging to the vicarage of Magor" in a document of 1585.

== Description ==
The original building was constructed of Old Red Sandstone, over a rubble core, and with Triassic sandstone dressings. It was two storeys high with a cellar below. The main floor was subdivided into three rooms, each with a fireplace. The overall arrangement is "typical of late medieval priests' houses." The plan of the house is broadly rectangular, with two projecting wings.

The Procurator's House, or, more accurately, its site, is one of only two such houses known in Britain, the other being Chesterton Tower, near Cambridge.

A plaque attached to the ruins suggests that they date from the 14th century, rather than the 16th, and represent the remains of the original procurator's house. This claim is repeated on the Magor with Undy Community Council website. However, it is contradicted by Cadw, by the Royal Commission on the Ancient and Historical Monuments of Wales, and by John Newman, author of the Pevsner Guide The Buildings of Wales: Gwent/Monmouthshire.

A Scheduled Monument, the ruins are also a Grade II* listed building due to their "important architectural and historic interest."
