= St Mary's Church, Undy =

St Mary's, Undy
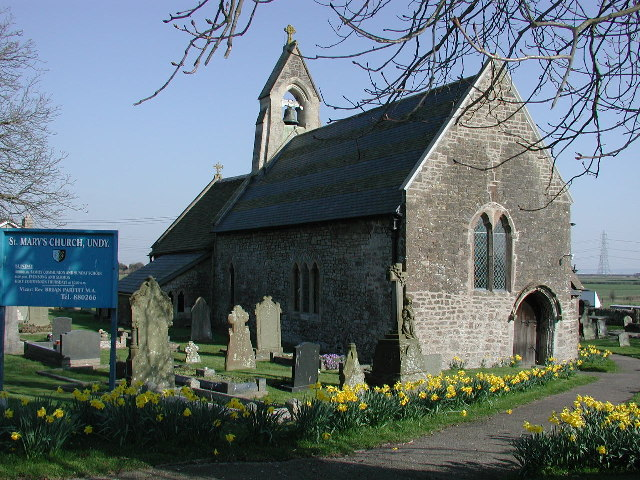
- St Mary's, Undy
- 51.5779°N 2.8083°W
- Denomination: Church in Wales
- Previous denomination: Roman Catholic

History
- Status: Active
- Dedication: St Mary

Architecture
- Heritage designation: Grade II
- Designated: 19 August 1955
- Years built: c. 12th Century

Specifications
- Materials: stone

Administration
- Diocese: Monmouth
- Archdeaconry: Monmouth
- Deanery: Netherwent

St Mary's Church, Undy is located in the village of Undy, in Monmouthshire, Wales.

== History ==
The church dates to around the twelfth century. The pointed chancel is from the following century, and was extended at a later (unclear) date. In 1880, the church underwent a major restoration by John Prichard, its north nave window dating from this period, though many of the other windows are considerably older. At this time, a small tower that stood at the centre of the structure was removed and replaced with a (comparatively) large bell turret. The names of the churchwardens in service in 1790 are carved on the porch. A second restoration occurred in 2001.

== Organisation ==
The church is part of the Rectorial Benefice of Magor, in the deanery of Netherwent.

== Listing ==
The church has been a Grade II listed building since 1955.
