= Cleddon Bog =

Protected area in Monmouthshire, Wales

Coordinates: 51.732°N 2.712°W

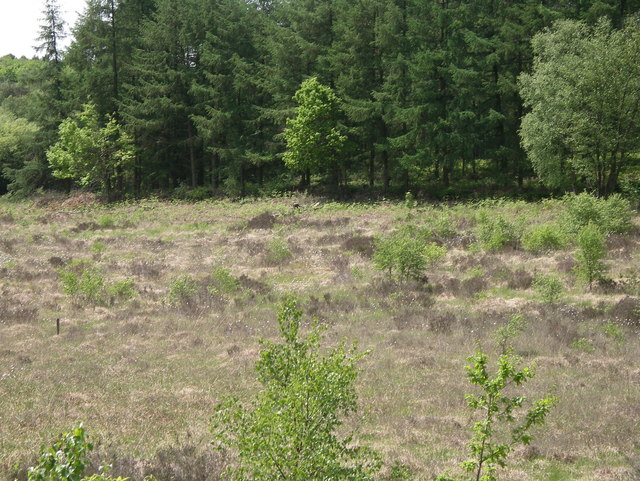
Cleddon Bog - geograph.org.uk - 300959

Cleddon Bog (Welsh: Cors Cledan; grid reference SO509039) is a bog in the vice-county of Monmouthshire which has been notified as a biological Site of Special Scientific Interest. It lies within the Wye Valley Area of Outstanding Natural Beauty. It was declared a Local Nature Reserve in May 1970.

The bramble Rubus trelleckensis, which is endemic to Monmouthshire, is present at the site. Other plant species present include cranberry (Vaccinium oxycoccos), bog asphodel (Narthecium ossifragum), round-leaved sundew (Drosera rotundifolia), bottle sedge (Carex rostrata) and heath spotted orchid (Dactylorhiza maculata).

The site is one of the best sites for recording butterflies and moths in eastern Wales. The site's interfaces between boggy heathland and woodland, with patches of bilberry and heather grow under an open canopy of rowan and other deciduous trees, means that it is home to a variety of important lepidoptera species for Wales such as the Bilberry Pug and welsh wave moths. Cleddon Bog is important not because it has so many national rarities, the only one UK Biodiversity Action Plan Priority species present is the White-line Snout, although three Species of Conservation Concern have also been recorded, but in its diversity of species, for some of which it represents the sole Gwent site. A total of 57 nationally notable or local species of butterfly and moth have been recorded on site. Among the 18 species of butterflies which have been recorded the silver-washed fritillary was always uncommon, however the small pearl-bordered fritillary, which was common has gone unrecorded since 1987. This follows the pattern of this species decline across eastern Gwent. The green hairstreak also appear to have been extirpated from the site. The heathland moths have also declined, with some species not being recorded in recent years.

An increase in the density of the grass growing and of tree cover threatened to dry Cleddon Bog out, and between 2009 and 2012 management was carried out by the Environment Agency and the Countryside Council for Wales to restore the bog and to create new wet habitats for the bog's flora and fauna.
