= Harper's Grove – Lord's Grove =

Protected area in Monmouthshire, Wales

- Site of Special Scientific Interest
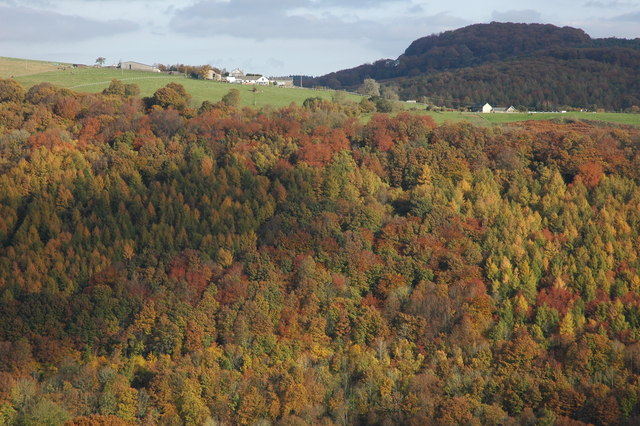
- Upper Beaulieu Farm and Lord's Grove

- Location within Monmouthshire
- Location of Harper's Grove – Lord's Grove.
- Area of search: Monmouthshire
- Grid reference: SO528113
- Coordinates: 51.7987°N 2.6848°W
- Interest: Biological
- Area: 22.2 hectares (0.222 km^{2}; 0.0857 sq mi)
- Notification date: 1981

Harper's Grove – Lord's Grove is a Site of Special Scientific Interest (SSSI), noted for its biological characteristics, in Monmouthshire, south east Wales.

== Geography ==
The 22.2-hectare (55-acre) SSSI, notified in 1981, is located within the community of Monmouth, being 1.5 miles (2.4 km) south-west of the town of the same name.

== Gallery ==
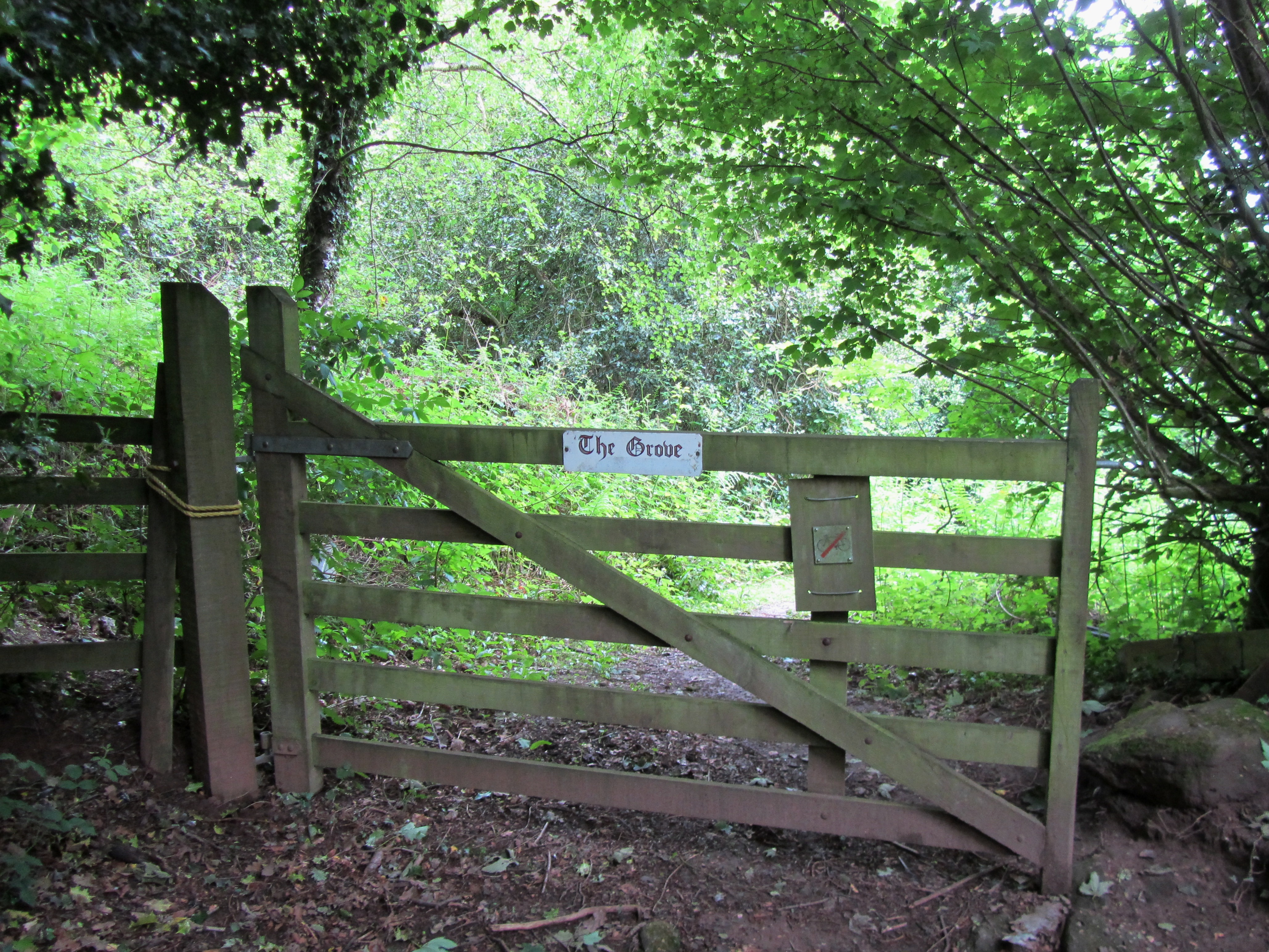
Entrance to Harper's Grove from Kymin Road

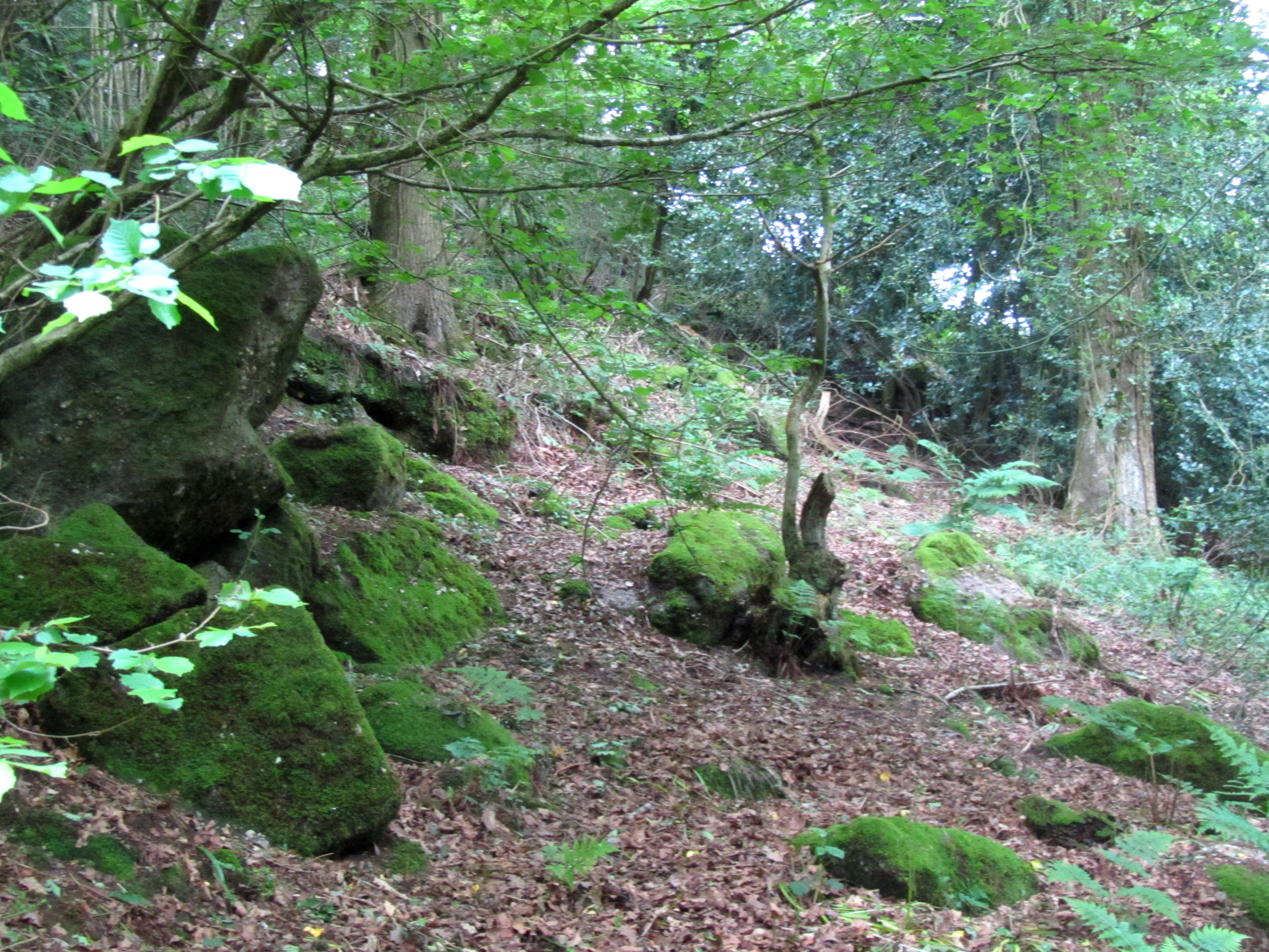
Rocks within Harper's Grove

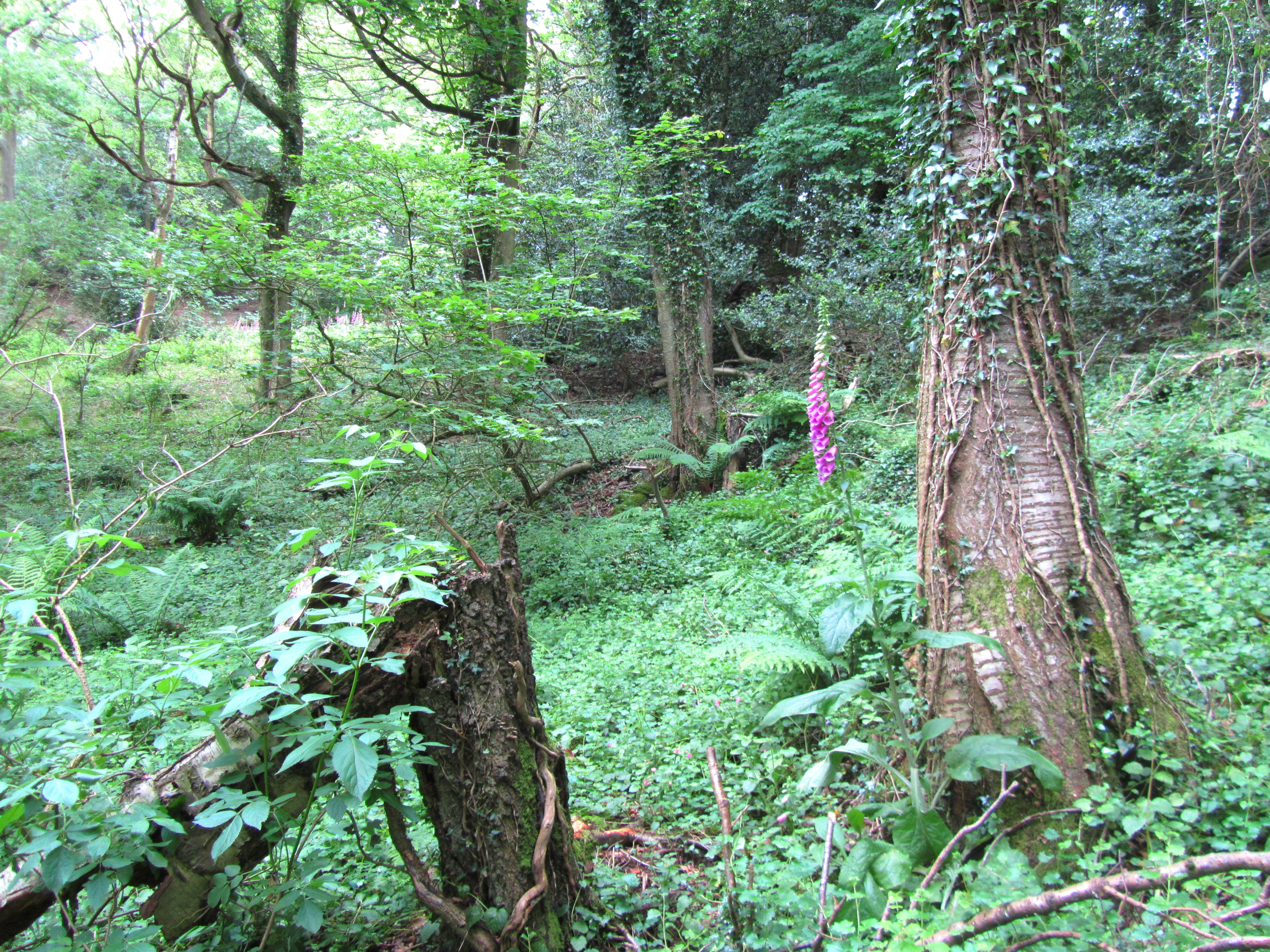
Flora of Harper's Grove

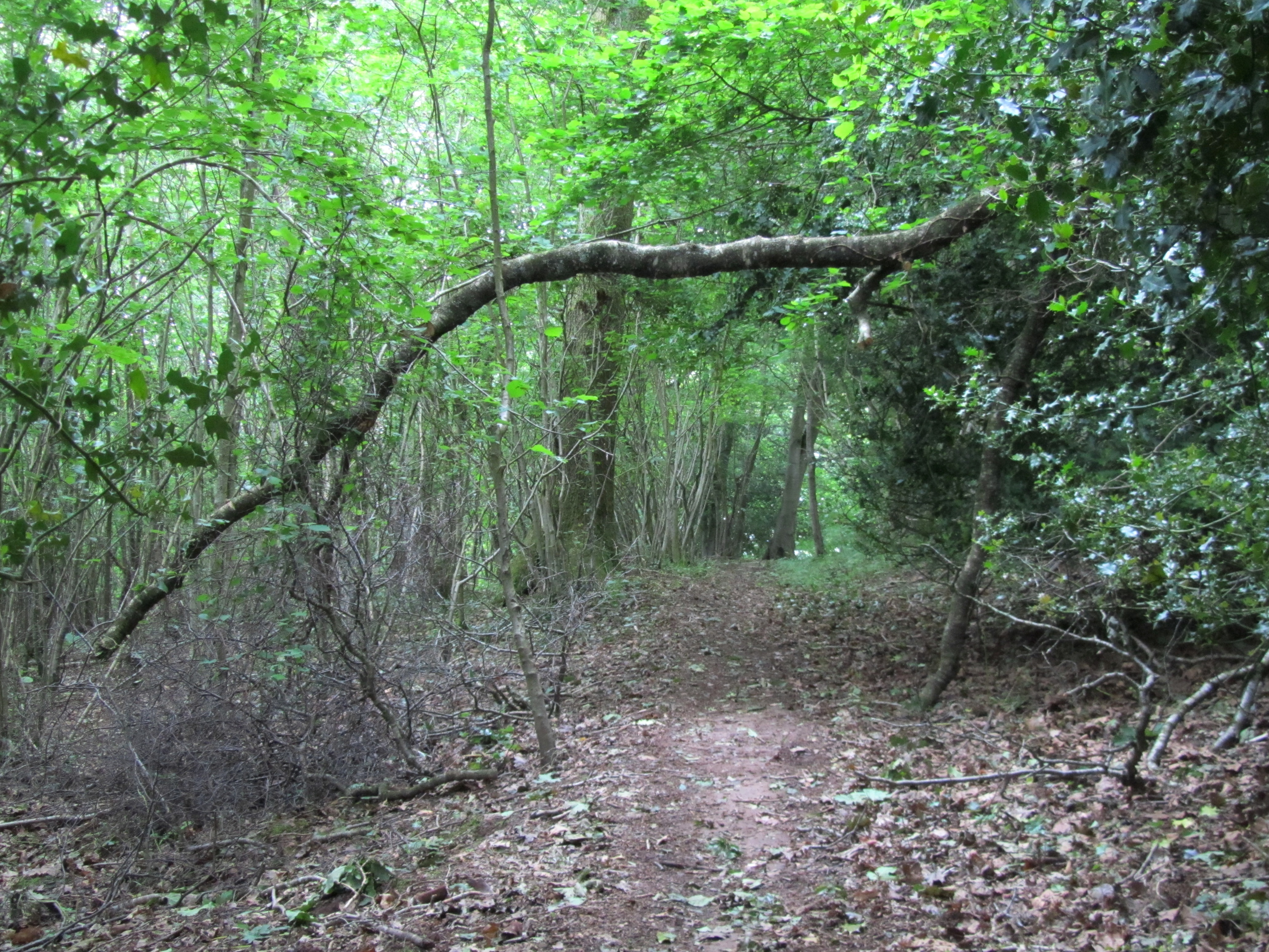
Footpath within Harper's Grove

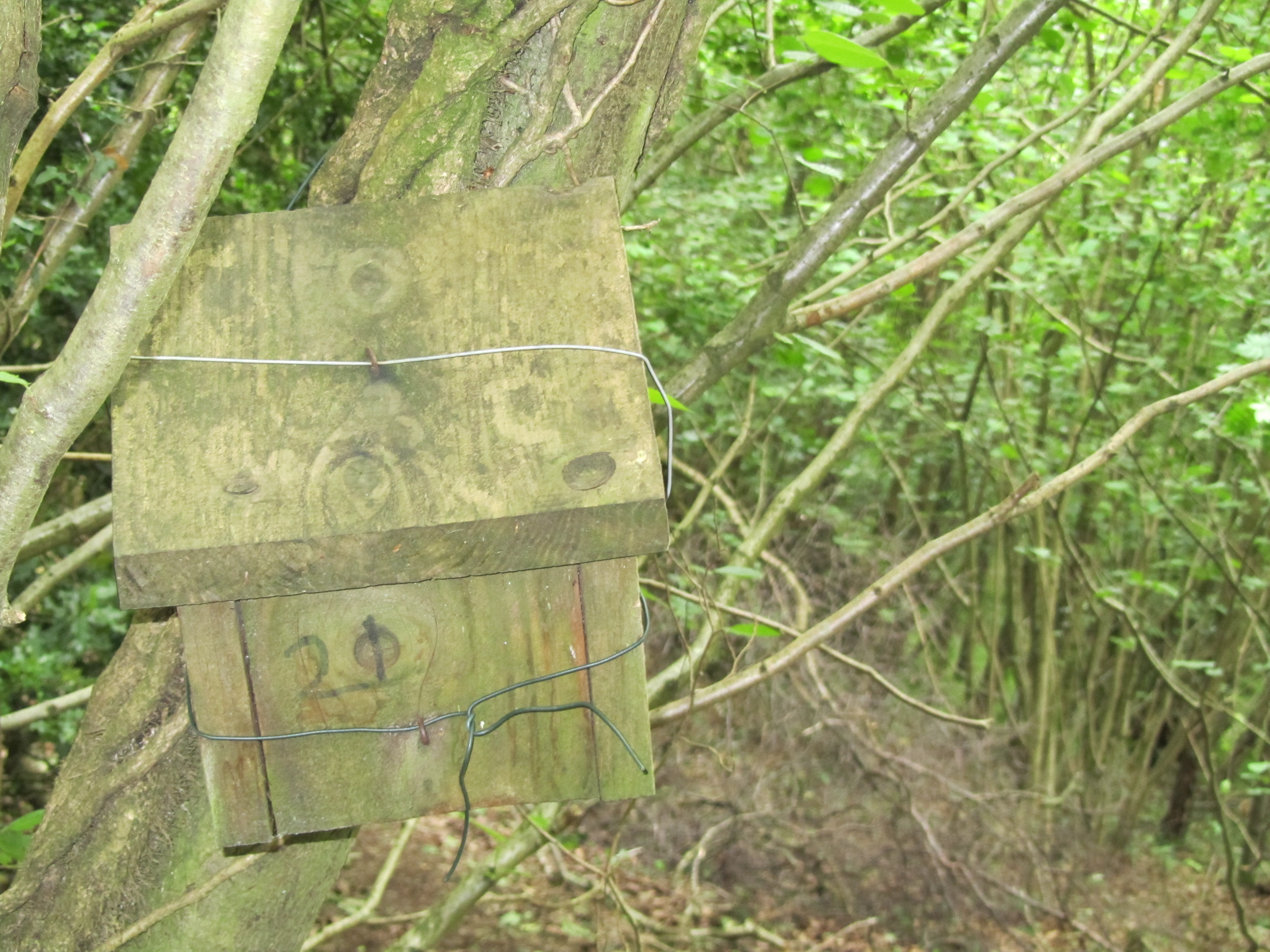
Birdbox on tree in Harper's Grove
