= Undy =

Undy: Welsh: Gwndy
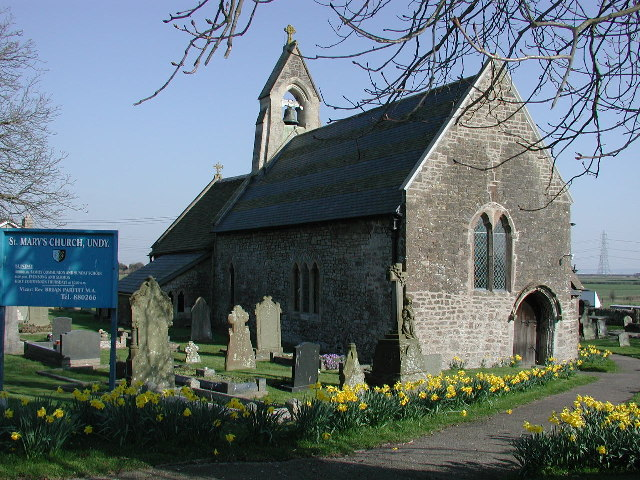
- Church of St. Mary, Undy

- Location within Monmouthshire
- Community: Magor with Undy
- Principal area: Monmouthshire
- Preserved county: Gwent
- Country: Wales
- Sovereign state: United Kingdom
- Post town: CALDICOT
- Postcode district: NP26
- Dialling code: 01633
- Police: Gwent
- Fire: South Wales
- Ambulance: Welsh
- UK Parliament: Monmouthshire

Undy (Welsh: Gwndy) is a village in Monmouthshire, south east Wales, adjoining the village of Magor with which it forms the community and parish of Magor with Undy. It is located about 3 miles (4.8 km) west of Caldicot and 10 miles (16 km) east of Newport, close to the junction of the M4 and M48 motorways, and adjoins the Caldicot Levels on the north side of the Bristol Channel.

== History ==
The area was first settled in Roman times. In 1996 a stone coffin dating from the 3rd or 4th century was found during building work, containing the skeleton of a young woman.

The village name is of uncertain origin. Previous spellings include Wondy, as noted by William Camden in 1610. The manor was an early seat of the Seymour family. The parish church of St. Mary contains a 13th-century west window and font, and an archway and porch from the same period or slightly later. It was substantially rebuilt around 1880.

The village underwent major expansion in the late 20th century, following the development of nearby Caldicot and Magor as suburban housing areas for those working in Newport, Cardiff and Bristol.

== Amenities ==
Undy (along with Magor) supports a village community with a church and an athletic club to the eastern side of the village. It has a clubhouse and dedicated pitches alongside the railway line and is the focal point for many sporting and social activities

Undy is the home of the ReadySteadyGo club, an activity club for young children with an autism diagnosis.

=== Railway ===
The main railway line between Swansea and London passes through Undy, although there is no station now. Between 11 September 1933 and November 1964 there was a small halt (at 51.578°N 2.819°W), although this was only 1/2 mile (0.80 km) to the east of the existing Magor railway station. This halt, like Caldicot, consisted of little more than two wooden platforms made from old sleepers, and a footbridge. From 1941 the main line was doubled to four running lines, with the outer two lines as slow goods-only lines to serve the increasing wartime coal traffic, without delaying fast trains on the central main lines. The main lines also included a pair of water troughs and their large supply tank. Although these troughs were removed by the end of steam services in the 1960s, their location is still used to water the occasional steam-hauled special services on this line.
