= Graig Wood =

Protected area in Monmouthshire, Wales

- Site of Special Scientific Interest
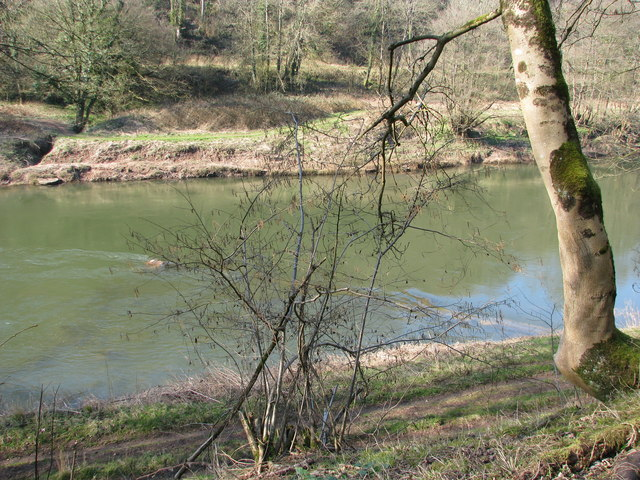
- View towards wood over other side of River Wye

- Location within Monmouthshire
- Location of Graig Wood.
- Area of search: Monmouthshire
- Grid reference: SO533087
- Coordinates: 51.7754°N 2.6776°W
- Interest: Biological
- Area: 14.3 hectares (0.143 km^{2}; 0.0552 sq mi)
- Notification date: 1981

Graig Wood is a Site of Special Scientific Interest (SSSI), noted for its biological characteristics, in Monmouthshire, south east Wales. It forms part of the wider Hael Woods complex.

== Geography ==
The 14.3-hectare (35-acre) SSSI, notified in 1981, is located within the community of Trellech United, on the banks of the River Wye, 3 miles (4.8 km) south-east of the town of Monmouth. It is 0.5 miles (0.80 km) north of another SSSI, Lower Hael Wood.

The wood is jointly owned and managed by Gwent Wildlife Trust and the Forestry Commission.

== Wildlife and ecology ==
As with other woodland in the Wye Valley Area of Outstanding Natural Beauty, Graig Wood contains many local and rare tree species. The predominant species within the wood are ash (Fraxinus excelsior) and wych elm (Ulmus glabra), although other species present include black alder (Alnus glutinosa), common beech (Fagus sylvatica) and small-leaved lime (Tilia cordata).

The stream banks and old buildings within the wood are home to rich bryophyte colonies. Hart's-tongue fern (Asplenium scolopendrium) and snowdrops (Galanthus) also grow on the site.

Dormice have been reported within the woodland.
