= Fiddler's Elbow National Nature Reserve =

Nature reserve in Monmouthshire, Wales

Fiddler’s Elbow National Nature Reserve
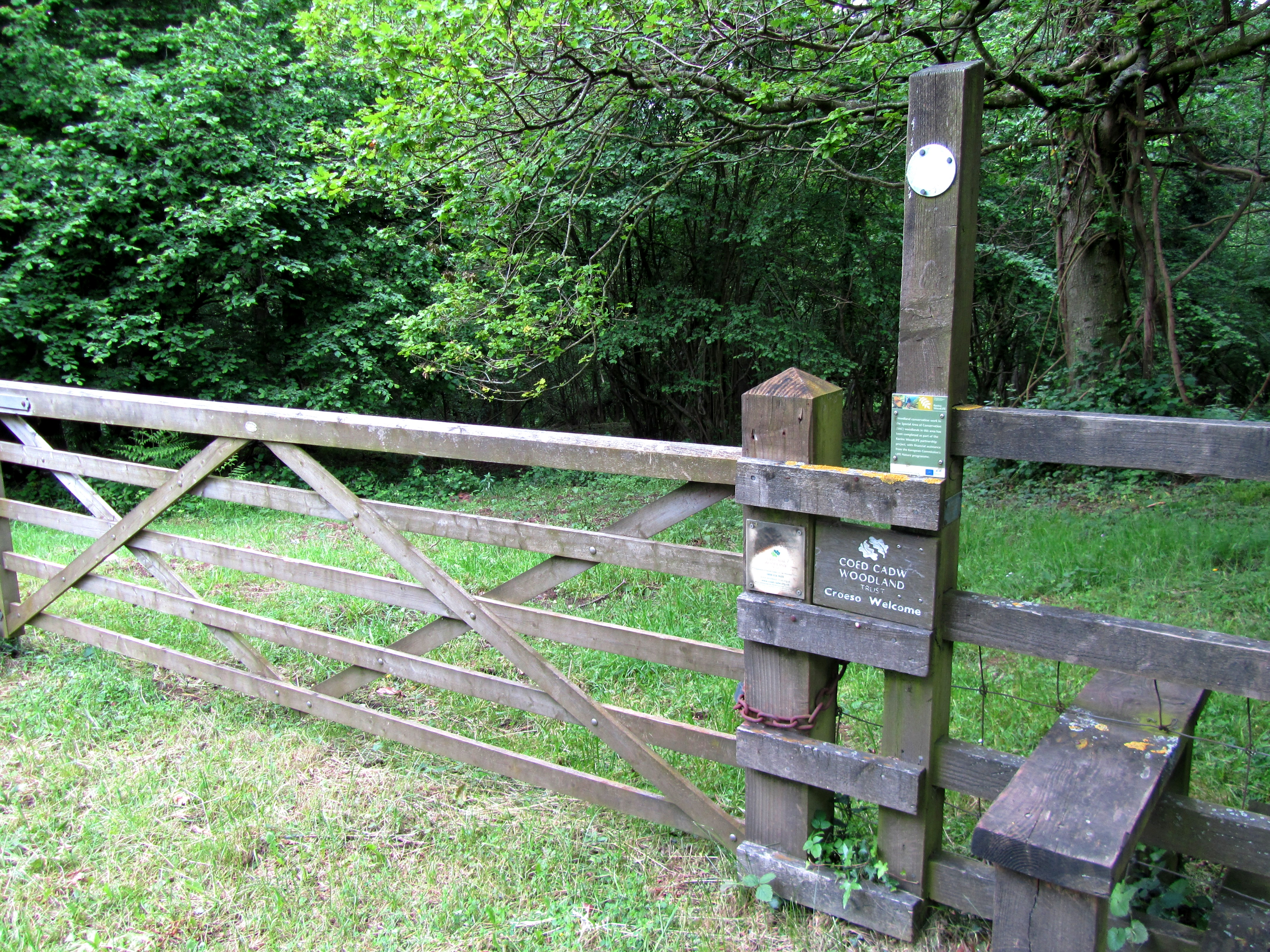
- Entrance to Fiddler's Elbow National Nature Reserve

- Location within Monmouthshire
- Type: National nature reserve
- Location: Upper Wye Valley, Monmouthshire
- Nearest city: Monmouth
- Coordinates: 51°49′19″N 2°41′10″W
- Area: 44.3 hectares (0.443 km^{2}; 0.171 sq mi)
- Operator: Woodland Trust
- Website: Countryside Council for Wales webpage

Fiddler's Elbow National Nature Reserve is a steep sided, woodland national nature reserve of 45 hectares in the Upper Wye Valley to the north of Monmouth in Wales, close to the Wales–England border. It is designated as a Site of Special Scientific Interest (SSSI) for its biological characteristics, containing a wide variety of flora.

== Geography ==
The 44.3-hectare (109-acre) nature reserve, which was notified as an SSSI in 1971, is located 1 kilometre (0.62 mi) east of the town of Monmouth in Monmouthshire on the eastern banks of the River Wye. The entire site contains the named woods of Lady Grove, Priory Grove to the north and Garth Wood in the south. The A4136 road runs through the middle of the reserve and Offa's Dyke Path, a National Trail, runs through the southern part of the reserve.

The eastern side of the site is owned and managed by the Woodland Trust and the western side is owned by a private individual, being managed in partnership with Natural Resources Wales, the successor body to the Countryside Council for Wales. It also forms part of the Wye Valley Woodlands Special Area of Conservation.

The reserve is underlain by sandstones from the Devonian period.

== Wildlife and ecology ==
=== Flora ===
As with other woodland in the Wye Valley Area of Outstanding Natural Beauty, Fiddler's Elbow contains many local and rare tree species. Of particular rarity in the county are the areas of English oak (Quercus robur) and Cornish oak (Quercus petraea) with small-leaved lime (Tilia cordata) coppice. Also within the nature reserve are common ash (Fraxinus excelsior), common beech (Fagus sylvatica), common hazel (Corylus avellana) and English yew (Taxus baccata).

The reserve also contains a large variety of ground flora, being known as a bluebell wood. Spring-flowering plants that occur on the site include the bluebell (Hyacinthoides non-scripta), common primrose (Primula vulgaris), lesser celandine (Ranunculus ficaria), ramsons (Allium ursinum) and wood anemone (Anemone nemorosa). Orchids are also present, with the varieties bird's-nest (Neottia nidus-avis), early purple (Orchis mascula) and the greater butterfly-orchid (Platanthera chlorantha) being found. The very rare ghost orchid (Epipogium aphyllum) has once been found within the site as well.

=== Fauna ===
Dormice can be found within the reserve, feeding off the brambles, hazel, honeysuckle, oak and sycamore. Roe deer are also present, but can cause a problem through over-grazing, therefore some parts of the woodland are fenced-off to protect it.

In addition, the nature reserve's management policy, which includes leaving fallen or standing dead wood in situ, also provides ideal habitats for fungi and invertebrates.
