= Croes Robert Wood =

Protected area in Monmouthshire, Wales

- Site of Special Scientific Interest
- Location within Monmouthshire
- Location of Croes Robert Wood.
- Area of search: Monmouthshire
- Grid reference: SO480060
- Coordinates: 51.7507°N 2.7538°W
- Interest: Biological
- Area: 18 hectares (0.180 km^{2}; 0.0695 sq mi)
- Notification date: 1981

Croes Robert Wood is a nature reserve and Site of Special Scientific Interest (SSSI), noted for its biological characteristics, in Monmouthshire, south east Wales. Gwent Wildlife Trust, the owners of the site, manage the woodland through methods of coppicing and charcoal burning to encourage its notable flora and fauna.

== Geography ==
The 18-hectare (44-acre) SSSI, notified in 1981, is located within the community of Mitchel Troy, 4 miles (6.4 km) south of the town of Monmouth.

The site is owned by Gwent Wildlife Trust as well as private individuals.

== Wildlife and ecology ==
As with other woodland in the Wye Valley Area of Outstanding Natural Beauty, Croes Robert Wood contains many local and rare tree species. Established on the upper slopes are common ash (Fraxinus excelsior), silver birch (Betula pendula), wych elm (Ulmus glabra) and wild cherry (Prunus avium) trees, with black alder (Alnus glutinosa) growing on the lower reaches. The wood is also noted for its bryophyte interest.

The dormouse, considered to be rare and endangered, can be found on the nature reserve, as well as badger, fallow deer, weasel and the yellow-necked mouse. Bird species recorded in the wood include Eurasian bullfinch, grasshopper warbler, great spotted woodpecker, long-tailed tit, nightingale and Eurasian woodcock. Several species of butterfly and moth can also be found within the site.

Gwent Wildlife Trust has employed techniques of coppicing and charcoal burning to manage the woodland, after it was clear-felled in 1982, creating sections of different aged woods allowing the dormice to feed on the berries, fruits and nuts that can be found in the newer clearings. The Trust sells the resulting charcoal locally to fund the conservation work.
