= Pentwyn Farm Grasslands =

Protected area in Monmouthshire, Wales

- Site of Special Scientific Interest
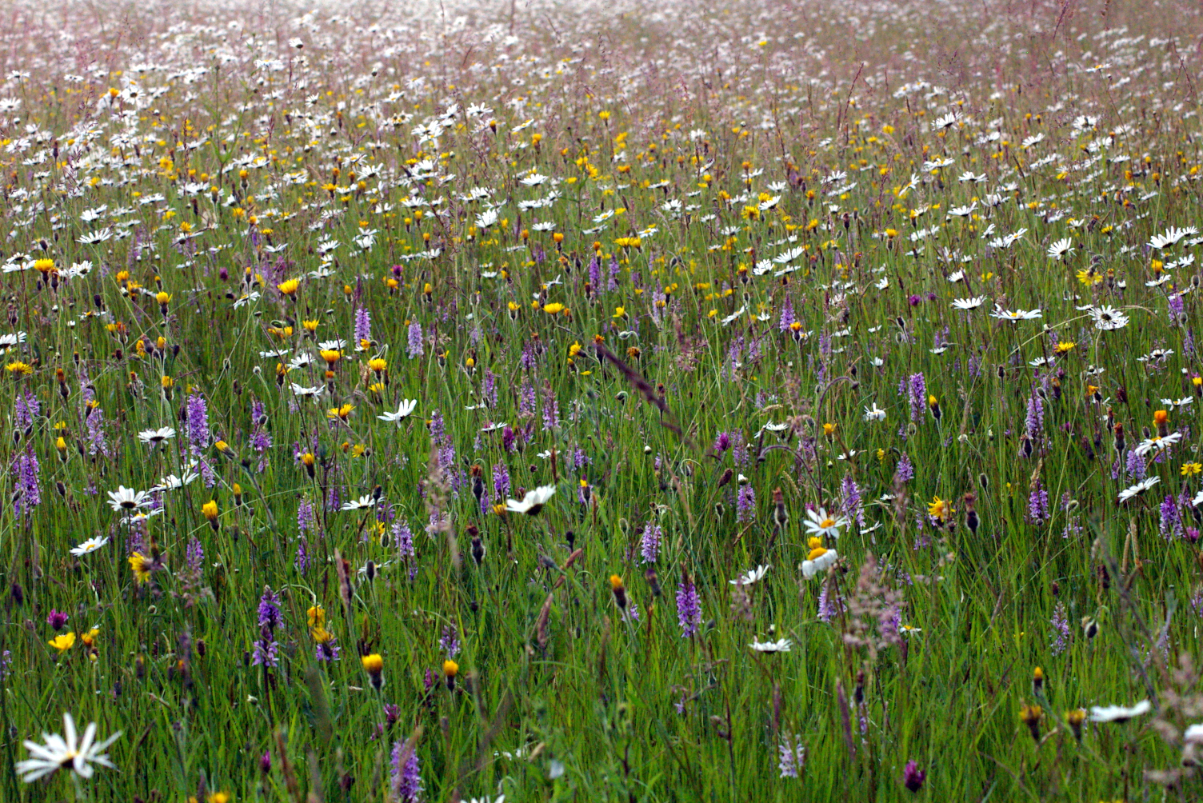
- Meadow of flowers in Pentwyn Farm Grasslands

- Location within Monmouthshire
- Location of Pentwyn Farm Grasslands.
- Area of search: Monmouthshire
- Grid reference: SO523093
- Coordinates: 51.7808°N 2.6920°W
- Interest: Biological
- Area: 11 hectares (0.110 km^{2}; 0.0425 sq mi)
- Notification date: 1993

Pentwyn Farm Grasslands is a nature reserve, and a series of agricultural fields, in Monmouthshire, southeast Wales. It was designated a Site of Special Scientific Interest (SSSI) in 1993, noted for its biological characteristics.

== Geography ==
The 7.6-hectare (19-acre) SSSI, spread over 3 separate enclosed spaces, is located within the community of Mitchel Troy, 2.5 miles (4.0 km) south of the town of Monmouth. They are centred on Pentwyn Farm, to the north of the village of Penallt.

The site is owned by the Gwent Wildlife Trust as well as private individuals. The grasslands lie on top of the local red sandstone and brown earth soils. The ground generally slopes in a southerly direction, but one field does slope to the north.

== Wildlife and ecology ==
The traditionally-managed, unimproved neutral grassland, that Pentwyn Farm supports, is one of the largest in the area and is of importance as this type of grassland is in decline within Britain. The flora that dominates this reserve is the common knapweed (Centaurea nigra), common bent (Agrostis capillaris), meadow vetchling (Lathyrus pratensis), red fescue (Festuca rubra) and sweet vernal grass (Anthoxanthum odoratum), with cock's-foot (Dactylis glomerata) and crested dog's-tail (Cynosurus cristatus) preferring low-lying areas. Also present are red clover (Trifolium pratense) and common bird's-foot trefoil (Lotus corniculatus), the latter having a more sporadic distribution on the site.

Green-winged orchids (Anacamptis morio) are also present on the site, in one of the largest populations within the vice-county of Monmouthshire. This orchid is becoming increasingly uncommon within Monmouthshire as well as nationally. Other orchids found on the reserve include the common spotted (Dactylorhiza fuchsii), common twayblade (Neottia ovata) and the greater butterfly (Platanthera chlorantha).

The hedgerows of the field system provide an ideal habitat for dormice and also offer food for overwintering fieldfares and redwings.

== Gallery ==
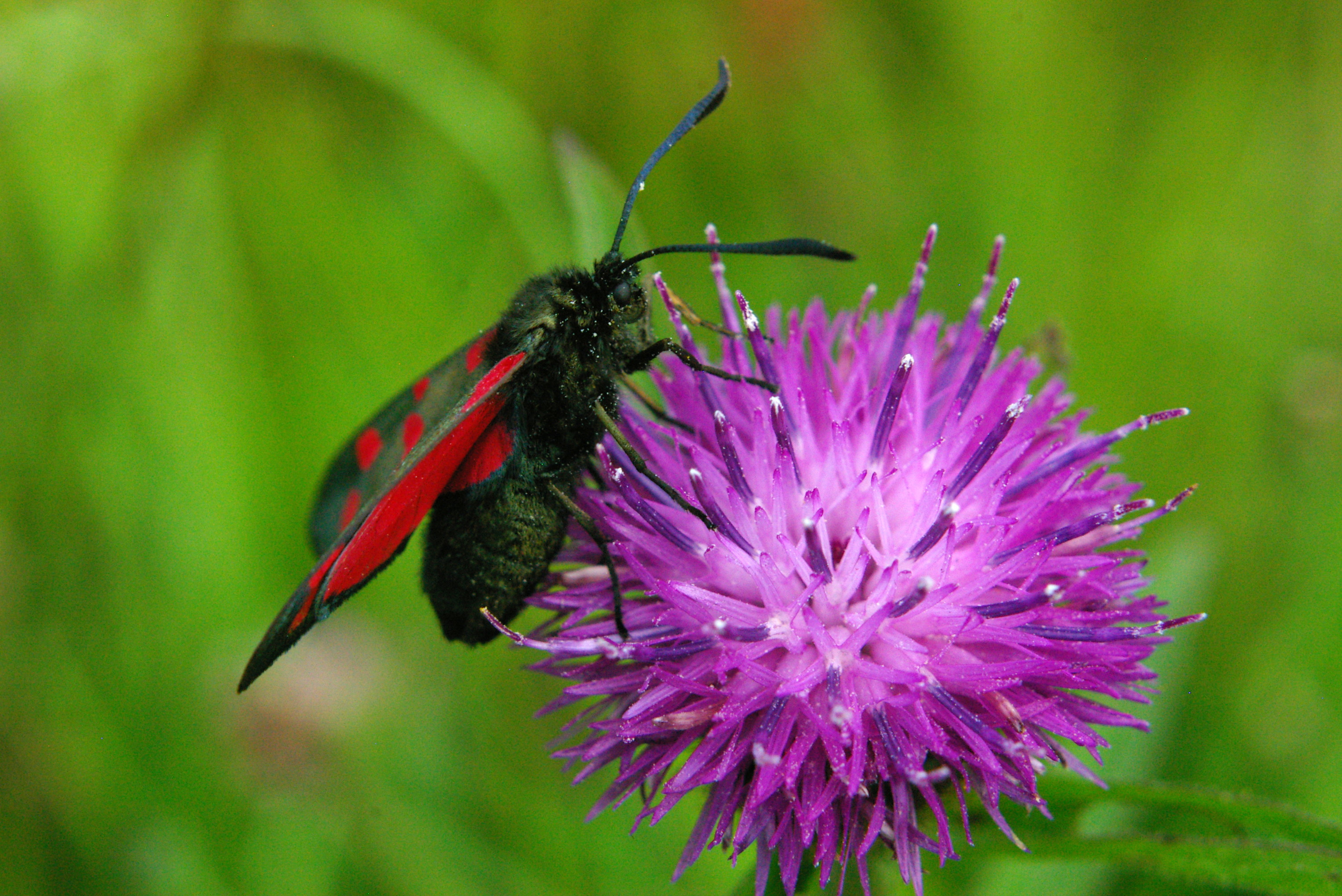
A Burnet moth on knapweed in the reserve

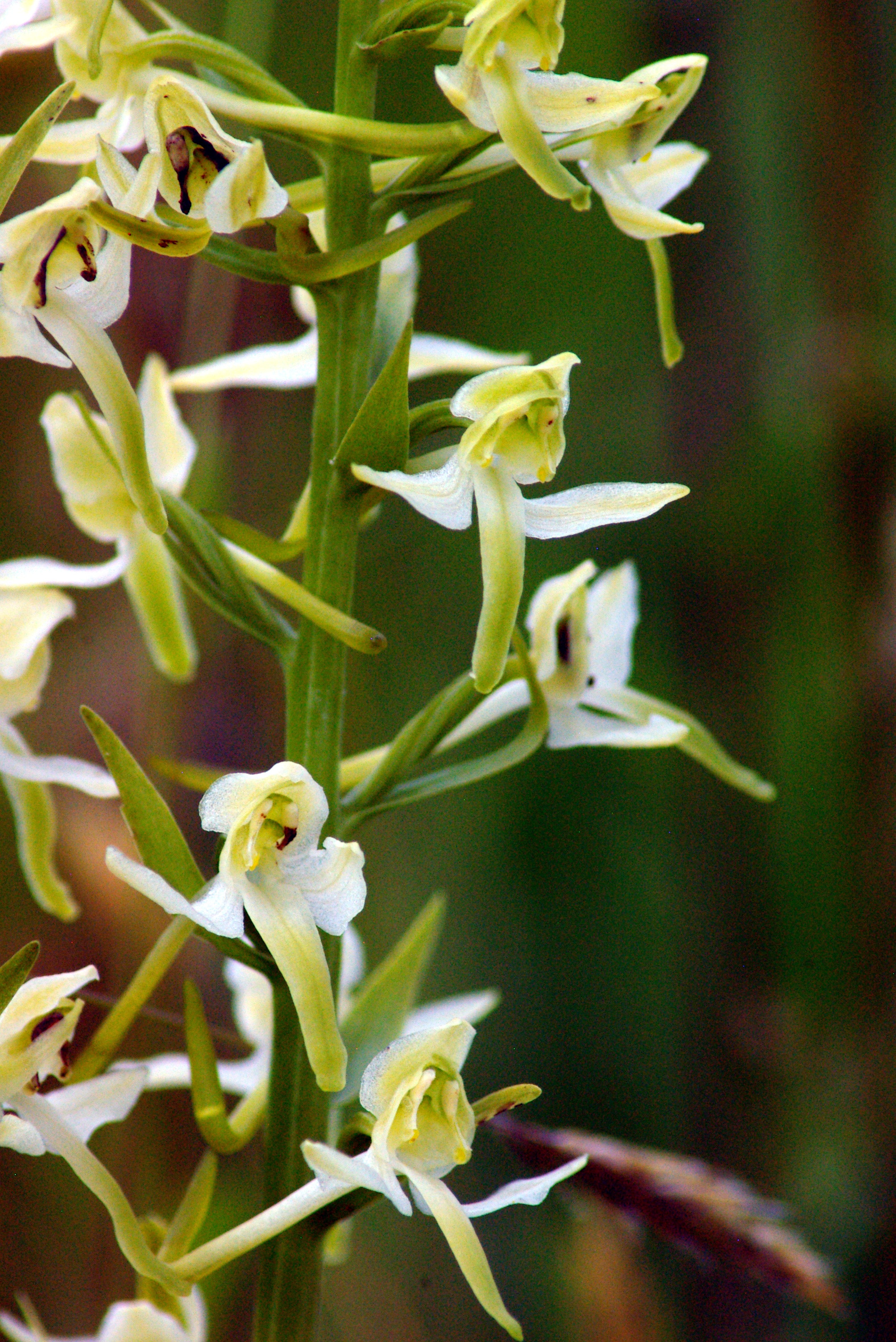
A greater butterfly orchid in the reserve

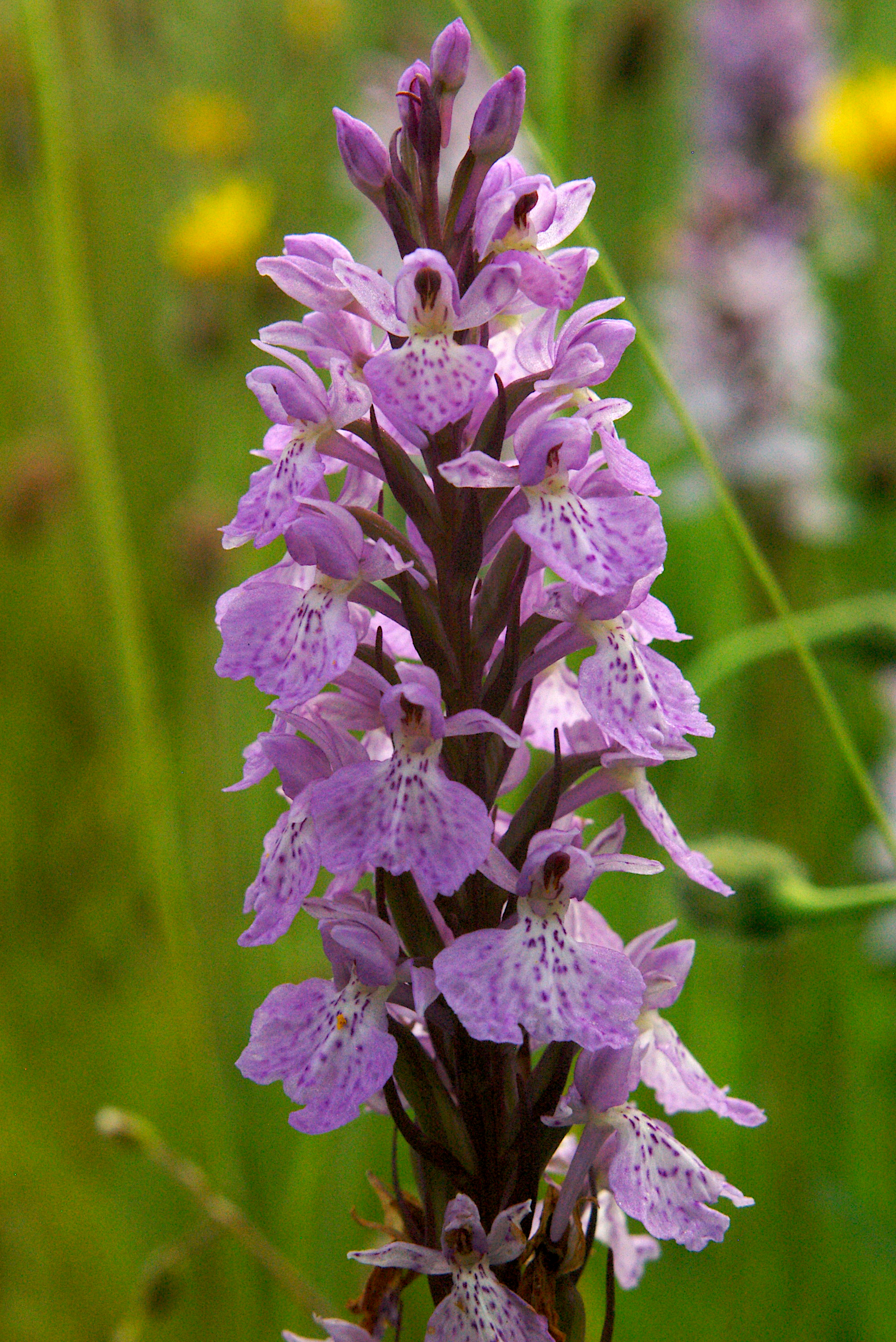
A common spotted orchid in the reserve

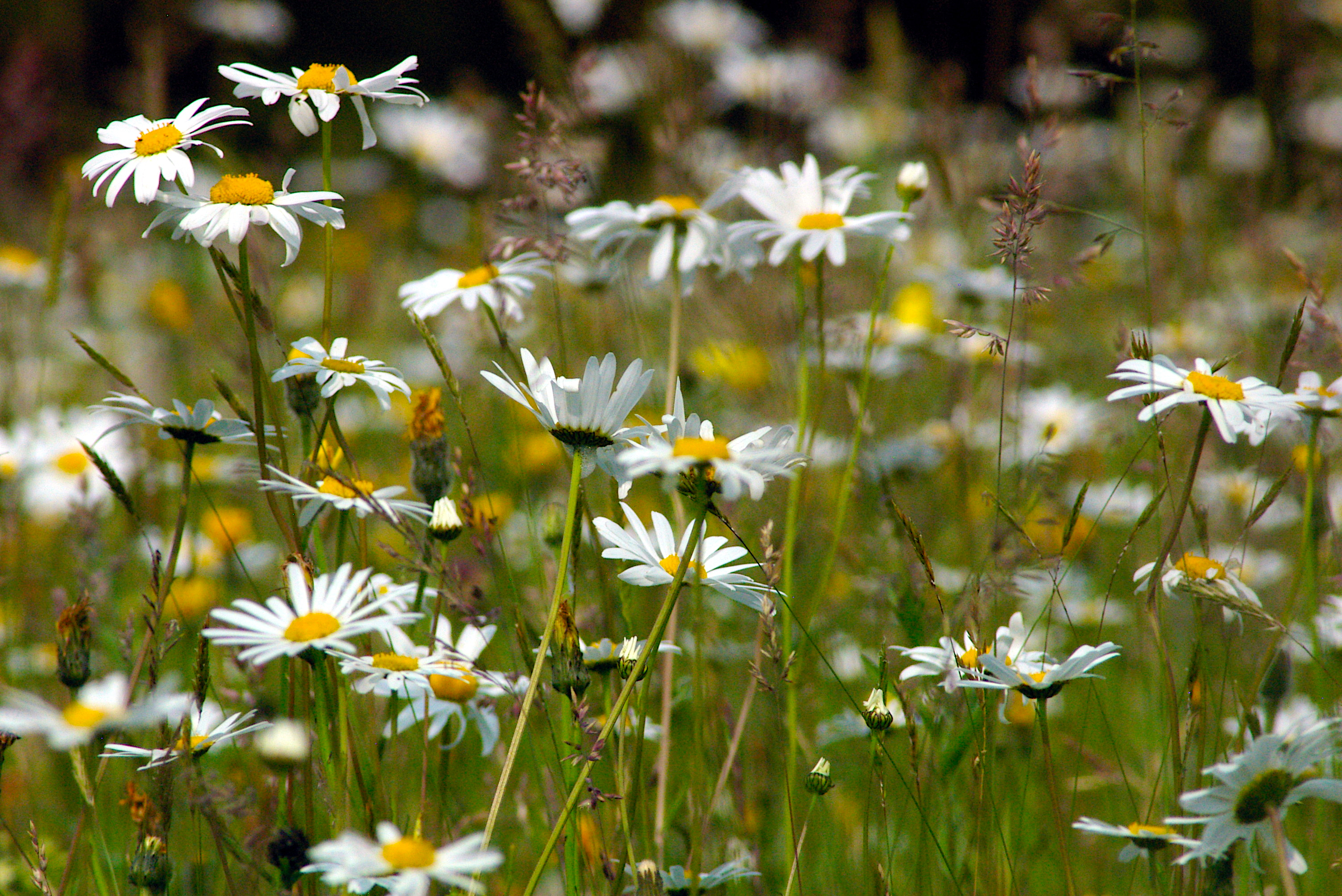
Ox eye daisies in the reserve

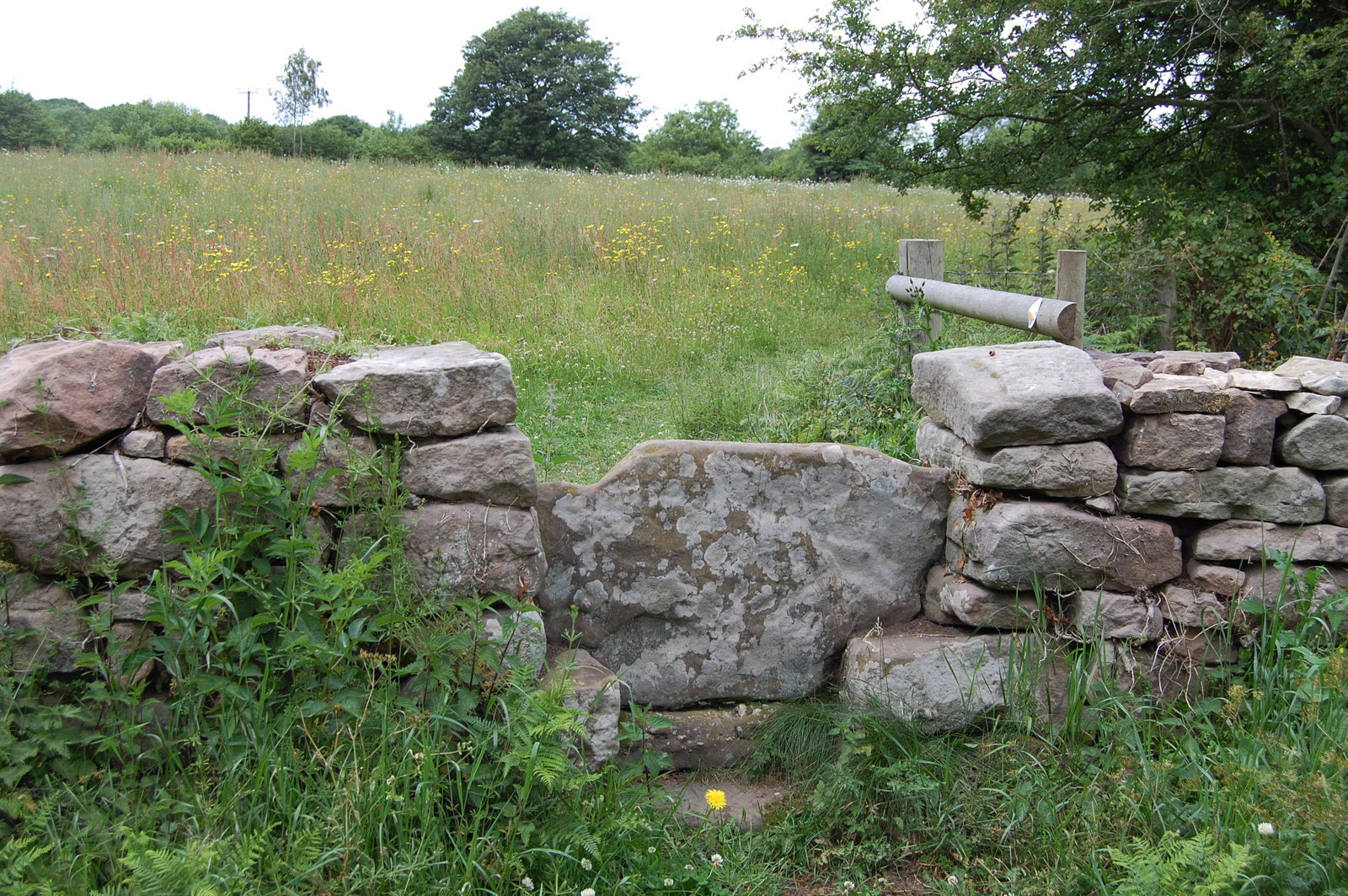
Entrance to one of the fields that make up Pentwyn Farm Grasslands
