= Gwent Wildlife Trust =

Wildlife trust in south-east Wales

Gwent Wildlife Trust (Welsh: Ymddiriedolaeth Natur Gwent) (GWT) is a wildlife trust covering the area between the lower Wye and Rhymney rivers which forms the vice county of Monmouthshire in south-east Wales. It is a registered charity and a member of the Wildlife Trusts Partnership.

== History ==
Its origins lie in the Monmouthshire Naturalists Trust, formed in 1963. In the 1980s the Trust was renamed the Gwent Trust for Nature Conservation, and then Gwent Wildlife Trust. Gwent was an administrative county between 1974 and 1996, covering a similar but not identical area to the historic county of Monmouthshire.

The Trust's first objective, under the then presidency of FitzRoy Somerset, 4th Baron Raglan, was the conservation of Magor Marsh, the last remaining area of fenland on the Caldicot Level. It was particularly responsible for survey work, training programmes, and increasingly in educational projects and in campaigns against inappropriate development proposals, particularly those affecting the Severn estuary. In 1991 it purchased Pentwyn Farm at Penallt, a unique smallholding, including ancient meadows and a collapsing medieval barn, having raised the purchase price of £150,000 within six weeks through a public appeal. In 2001 it bought Springdale Farm near Usk, containing 40 acres (16 ha) of species-rich unimproved grassland, 60 acres (24 ha) of other grassland, and an ancient wood. It now manages 32 reserves, and has a membership of some 7,500.

== Current activities and responsibilities ==
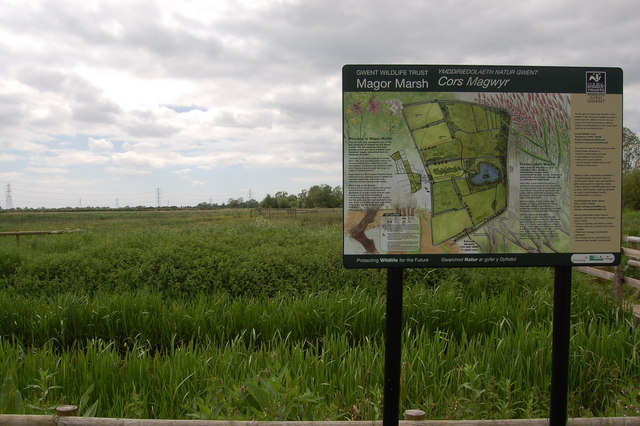
View westwards across Magor Marsh Nature Reserve, with Gwent Wildlife Trust information board

The Trust currently manages over 800 acres (320 ha) of wildlife rich habitat including working farms, woodlands and marshes. Projects such as wild flower meadow restoration take place on the reserves. Its projects also involve reviving traditional countryside skills such as charcoal production and dry stone walling.

The Trust currently designates four "Premier Reserves":

- Magor Marsh (Welsh: Cors Magwyr). This is a 90 acres (36 ha) wetland reserve with a rich variety of habitats, including damp hay meadows, sedge fen, reedbed, scrub, wet woodland, a large pond and numerous reens. It includes breeding grounds for common snipe, common redshank, reed warbler, grasshopper warbler and Cetti's warbler. It is the richest site in Wales for wetland beetles and soldier-flies. It is the last remnant of fenland on the Caldicot and Wentloog Levels, and its pattern of drainage ditches and other features has remained unchanged since the 14th century.
- Pentwyn Farm. This covers 30 acres (12 ha) high above the Wye valley, with traditional farm buildings, small fields and stone walls. It contains one of the largest areas of unimproved grassland in the area, and provides a habitat for dormice, adders-tongue fern, and many other species.
- Silent Valley Nature Reserve. This covers 125 acres (51 ha), including Britain's highest area of beech woodland, together with wet woodland and flushes. The reserve is managed in partnership with Blaenau Gwent County Borough Council.
- Springdale Farm. This covers 120 acres (49 ha) of working farmland, notable for its hay meadows and woodland flowers.

== Full list of reserves ==
- Allt-yr-yn, Newport
- Branches Fork Meadow, Pontypool
- Brockwells Meadow, Caerwent
- Caldicot Pill, Caldicot
- Coed Meyric Moel, Cwmbran
- Croes Robert Wood SSSI, Trellech
- Dan Y Graig, Risca
- Dixton Embankment, Monmouth
- Drybridge Community Nature Park, Monmouth
- Graig Wood, Trellech
- Henllys Bog, Cwmbran
- Kitty's Orchard, Usk
- Margarets Wood, Whitebrook
- Lower Minnetts Field, Rogiet
- Magor Marsh SSSI, Magor
- Margaret's Wood, Whitebrook
- New Grove Meadows, Trellech
- Pentwyn Farm SSSI, Penallt
- Peterstone Wentlooge Marshes SSSI, Peterstone
- Priory Wood SSSI, Bettws Newydd
- Prisk Wood SSSI, Penallt
- Rogiet Poorland, Rogiet
- Silent Valley SSSI, Cwm
- Solutia Reserve at Great Traston Meadows, Nash
- Springdale Farm, Llangwm
- Strawberry Cottage Wood, Llanvihangel Crucorney
- The Wern, Monmouth
- Wyeswood Common, Trellech
