= Livox Wood =

Woodland in Monmouthshire, Wales

- Site of Special Scientific Interest
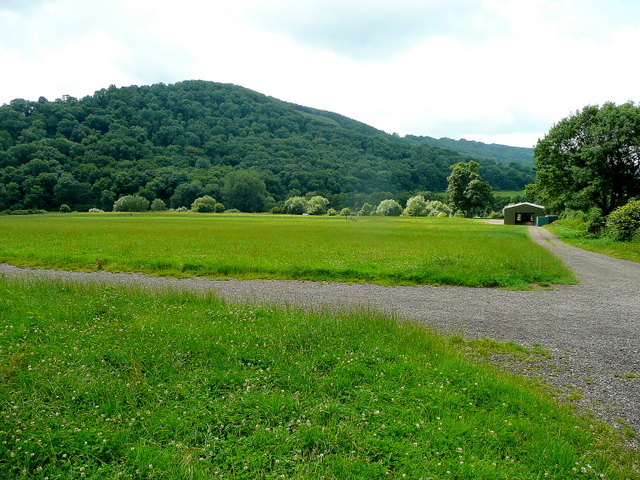
- Livox Wood, behind the Monmouthshire Show ground

- Location within Monmouthshire
- Location of Livox Wood.
- Area of search: Monmouthshire
- Grid reference: SO519112
- Coordinates: 51.7978°N 2.6982°W
- Interest: Biological
- Area: 19.3 hectares (0.193 km^{2}; 0.0745 sq mi)
- Notification date: 1971

Livox Wood is a woodland and Site of Special Scientific Interest (SSSI), noted for its biological characteristics, in Monmouthshire, south east Wales.

== Geography ==
The 19-hectare (47-acre) SSSI, notified in 1971, is located within the community of Mitchel Troy, 1 mile (1.6 km) south-west of the town of Monmouth on the western shore of the River Wye. The woods overlook the current grounds used for the Monmouthshire Show, on the other side of the river.

The site is owned by Natural Resources Wales as well as private individuals.

== Wildlife and ecology ==
As with other woodland in the Wye Valley Area of Outstanding Natural Beauty, Livox Wood contains many local and rare tree species. The lower slopes of the wood contain ash (Fraxinus excelsior), black alder (Alnus glutinosa) and wych elm (Ulmus glabra), with Sessile oak Quercus petraea dominating the upper slopes. Other flora of interest include broad leaved sedge (Carex strigosa), the giant bellflower (Campanula latifolia) and toothwort (Lathraea squamaria).

A number of insect, bird and other animal species have been recorded on the site.
