= Coed-y-Cerrig National Nature Reserve =

Protected area in Wales

Coordinates: 51.884°N 3.029°W

Coed-y-Cerrig National Nature Reserve is located at the bottom of a deep valley in the Black Mountains, about 3.7 miles (6.0 km) north of Abergavenny and 2 miles (3.2 km) west of Llanfihangel Crucorney in Wales. Despite its small size, the reserve has a variety of wet and dry woodland habitats, making it rich in wildlife. Its moist valley floor is covered by an unusual type of alder woodland rich in fungi in the autumn.
