= Penhow Woodlands National Nature Reserve =

Nature reserve in Newport, Wales

Coordinates: 51.605°N 2.833°W

Penhow Woodlands National Nature Reserve is a national nature reserve and Site of Special Scientific Interest located in south east Wales near the village of Penhow, to the east of Newport. The reserve covers an area of 24 hectares (59 acres).

Penhow Woodlands National Nature Reserve covers three areas of ancient semi-natural woodland. Only one of them, at Coed Wen, is open to the public. The woods are dominated by ash, small-leaved lime, wych elm and gean, with an understorey of hazel. The site is coppiced In order to keep a reasonably open canopy allowing plenty of light onto the woodland floor, to benefit plants which grow beneath the trees. The woods grow on the tops and slopes of the limestone hills in the vicinity of Newport. This type of habitat is increasingly rare in the UK, as are the plants which grow within it.

== Wildlife ==
Penhow Woodlands is one of the best sites in Wales for spring flowers such as bluebells, as well as primroses, wood anemone and lesser celandine. The spring is also the best time to see the native wild daffodils in these woods, and these small, pale daffodils can ben in bloom from February to April.Herb paris, an indicator to the age and semi-natural nature of the woodlands, grows here and is today very localised and becoming rarer in the UK. Other rare and localised plants include green hellebore, a specialist of wood on limestone soils, and birds-nest orchid which grows in leaf litter and usually blooms around June. The upright spurge (Euphorbia stricta) grows only in south-east Wales and Gloucestershire in the UK and this reserve contains the largest population in Gwent. The birds recorded here include various species of warbler, common redstart, European pied flycatcher and tree pipit, which breed in the nature reserve.
