= Magor Marsh =

Wetland reserve on the Severn Estuary, Wales

Magor Marsh Reserve
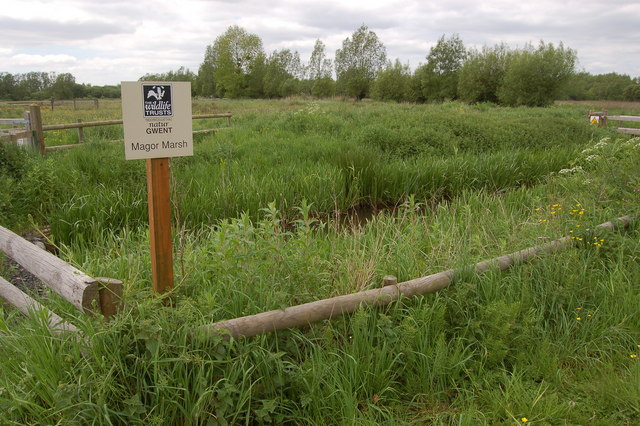
- Magor Marsh Nature Reserve in mid-May

- Location within Monmouthshire
- Type: Nature Reserve
- Location: Monmouthshire
- Nearest city: Magor
- OS grid: ST 428 866
- Coordinates: 51°34′34″N 2°49′37″W
- Area: 36 hectares (0.360 km^{2}; 0.139 sq mi)
- Operator: Gwent Wildlife Trust
- Hiking trails: The Dragonfly Trail and The Butterfly Trail
- Website: Gwent Wildlife Trust

Magor Marsh is a 36-hectare (90-acre) wetland reserve, located on the Welsh side of the Severn Estuary. It is managed by the Gwent Wildlife Trust. It has a great variety of habitats, including damp hay meadows, sedge fen, reed bed, scrub and wet woodland. There are also numerous reens and a large pond.

Magor Marsh Nature Reserve is the richest site in Wales for wetland beetles and soldier-flies, and its pattern of drainage ditches and other features have remained unchanged since the 14th century.

The nature reserve can be explored in Virtual Reality through the Gwent Wildlife Trust’s Digital Nature Reserves project. Digital guides can also be found at the reserve via QR codes which enable visitors to learn about the site and its wildlife during their visit. Click here to access the VR Experience in Welsh and English, as well as the Digital Guide web app.

Magor Marsh can also be seen 24/7 via live camera streaming on Gwent Wildlife Trust’s website. Stills are refreshed every five minutes.

In March 2020 the reserve was featured in the BBC One programme Countryfile.

== Geology ==
The soil of Magor Marsh is mostly peat with a depth of around 4.6 metres (15 ft). Beneath this is alluvium laid down by the Severn Estuary. The level of water must be kept near the surface to preserve the peat.

== Wildlife ==
=== Flora ===
There are two hay meadows in Magor Marsh, maintained using traditional methods. The meadows are grazed during autumn and winter. The hay crop is mown in mid-summer to provide winter feed. By late spring the fields are a mass of flowers. In the meadows are such species as lady's smock, ragged robin, yellow flag, lesser spearwort and meadow thistle. The common species in the reeds are teasel, common reed, hemp agrimony and purple loosestrife. In the reen grow water horsetail, reedmace, marsh marigold and azure damselfly. Osier, crack willow and sallow are typical tree species in the wet woodland.

=== Fauna ===
Magor Marsh includes breeding grounds for common redshank and common snipe. Reed warbler, grasshopper warbler, cetti's warbler, reed bunting and chiffchaff also live in the reeds. In the pond are water rail, coot, grey heron, little grebe, moorhen, little egret, Eurasian teal, shoveler and kingfisher. In the reen the most common species are grass snake, great silver beetle, smooth newt and otter. The wet woodland typical has such species as great spotted woodpecker and musk beetle. Cuckoo can be heard in the summer. Osier, crack willow and sallow are typical species in the wet woodland. In the meadows the common butterflies are orange tip and meadow brown. The reens provide a habitat for azure damselfly. In 2019 leaf mines and a larva of the marbled marble (Celypha woodiana) was found on mistletoe (Viscum album), this Biodiversity Action Plan (UK BAP) species has a limited distribution in Britain and the 2019 record was the first confirmed for Wales.

The European water vole can be found within the reserve.

== Gallery ==
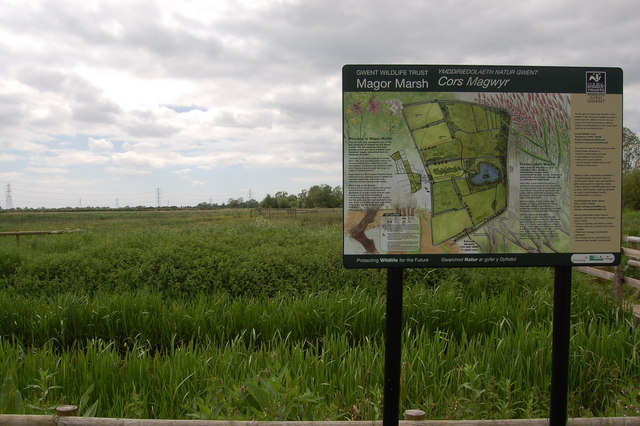
Information board at Magor Marsh Nature Reserve

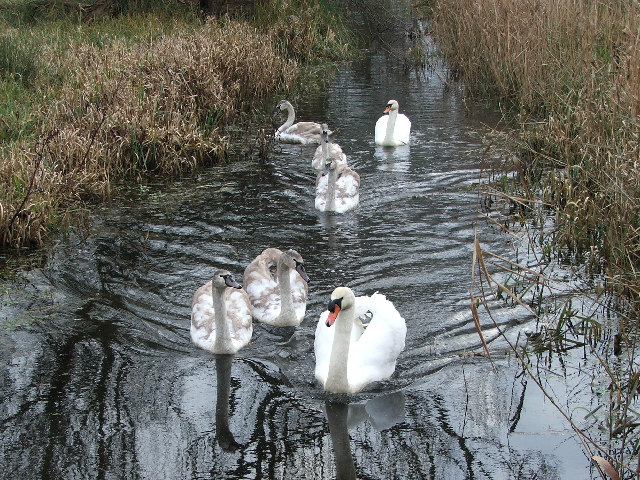
Swans on Christmas Day, 2005

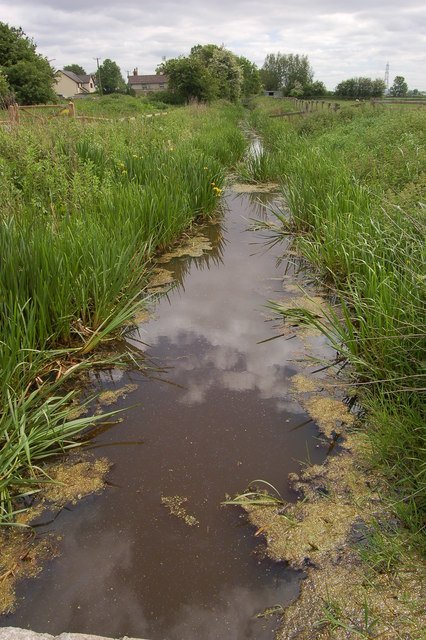
Looking south along a drainage ditch, towards the River Severn

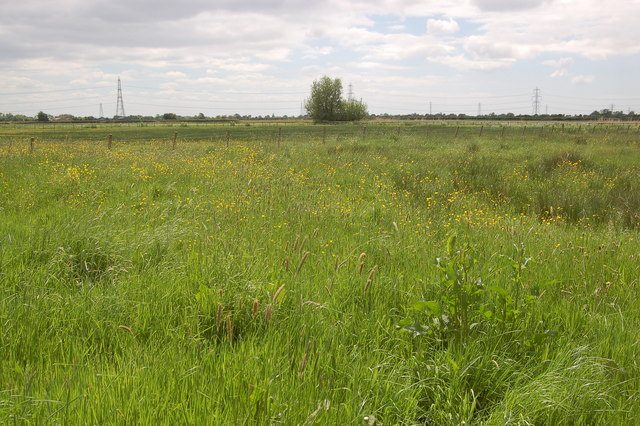
Meadow at Magor Marsh

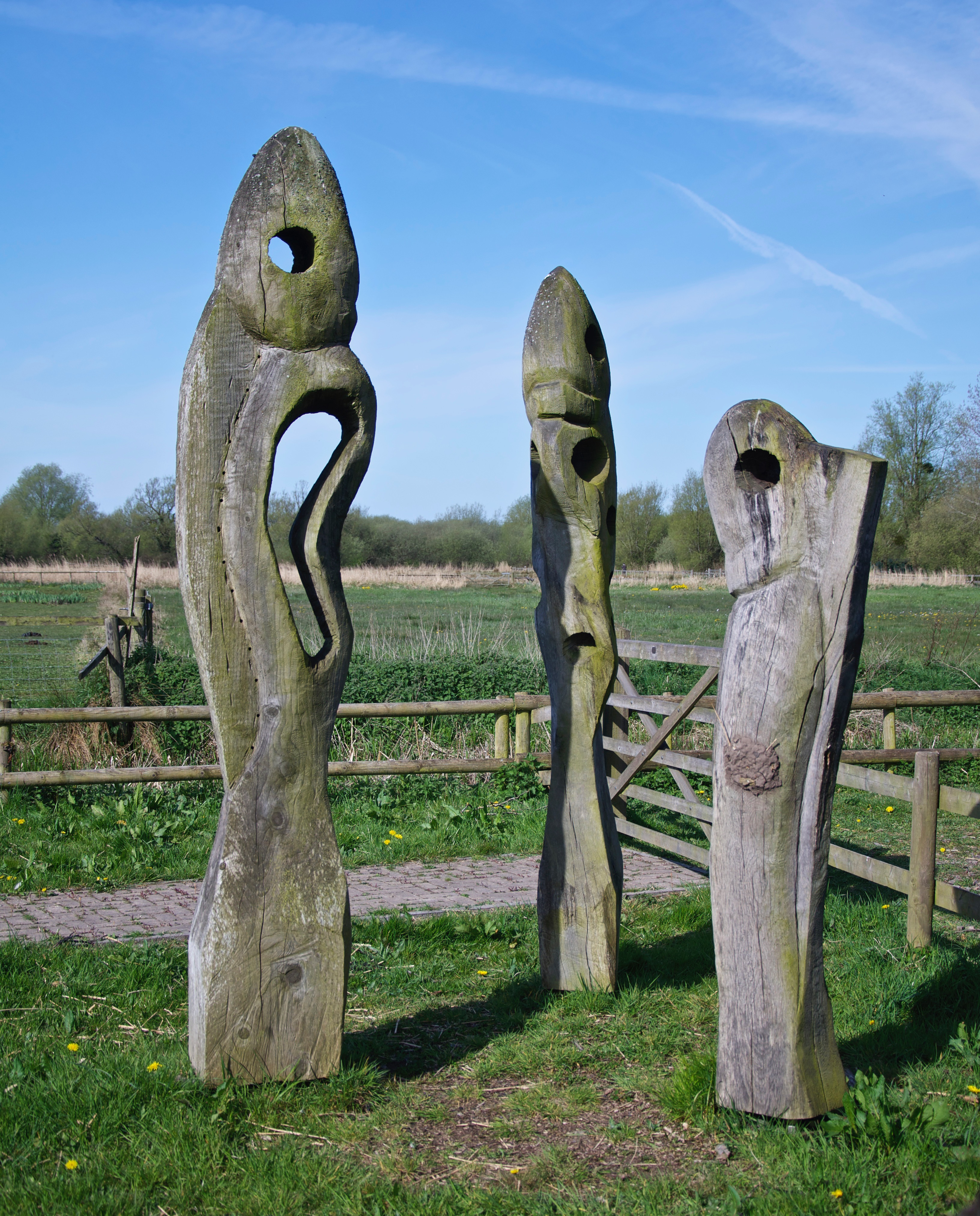

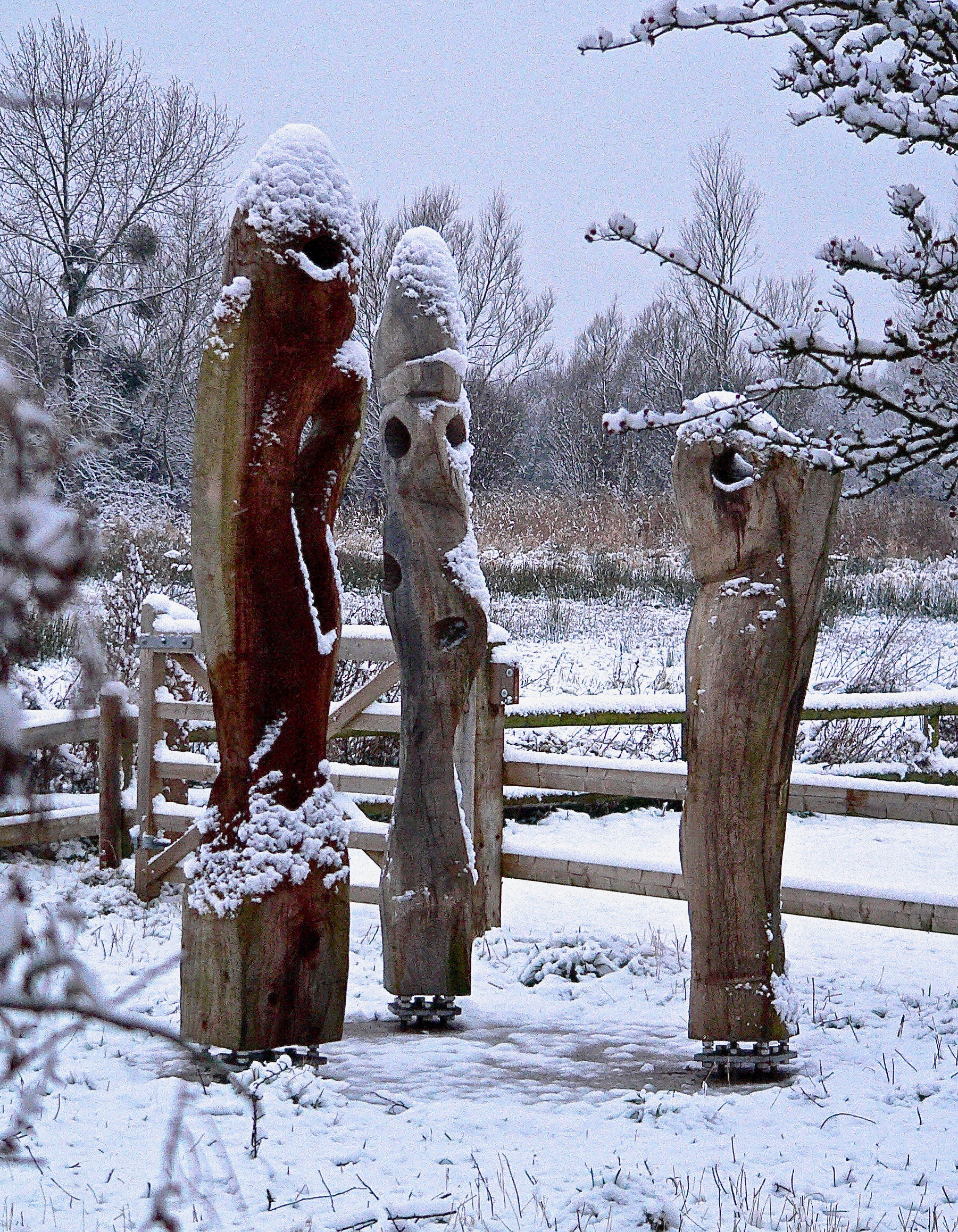

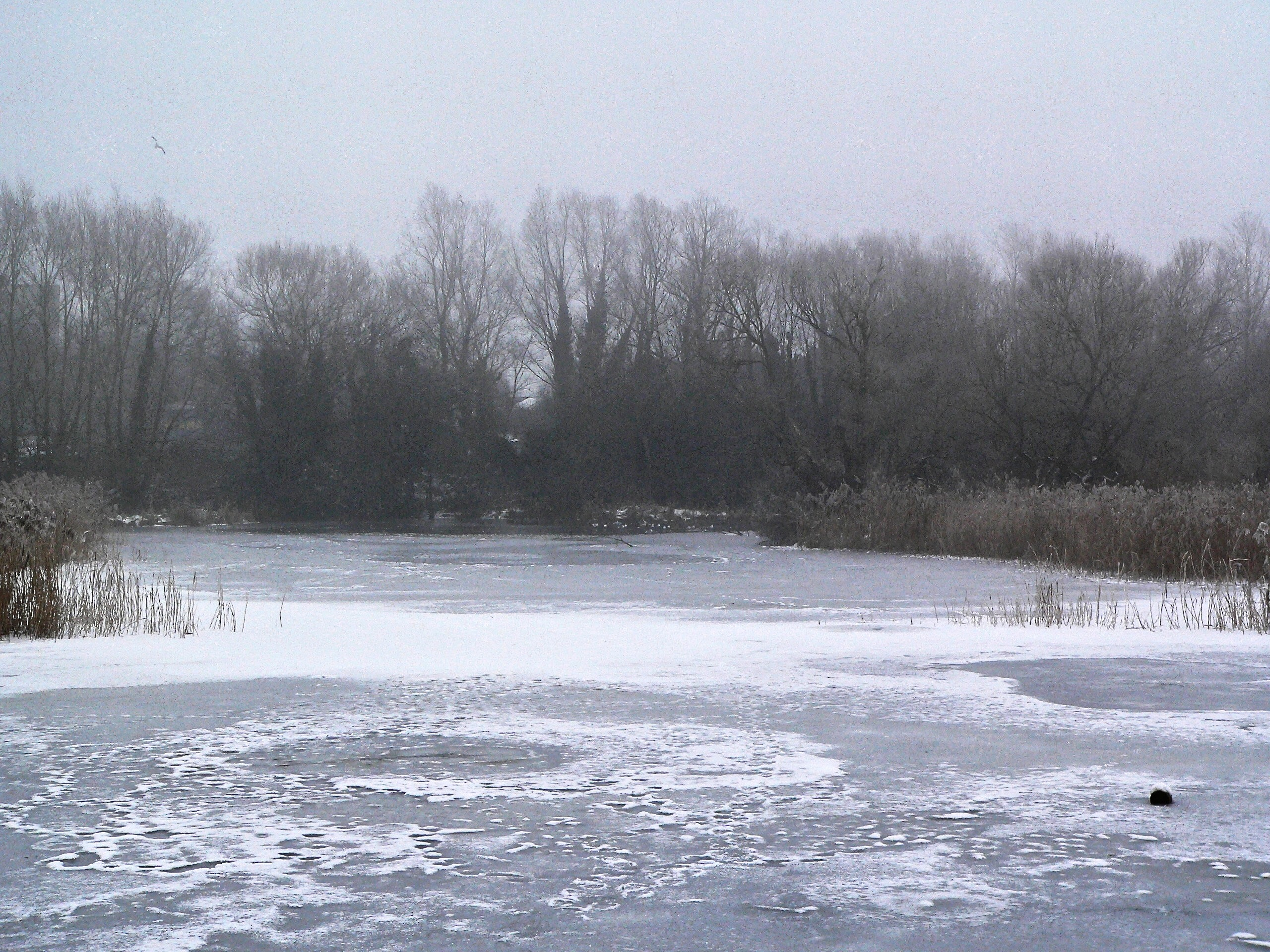

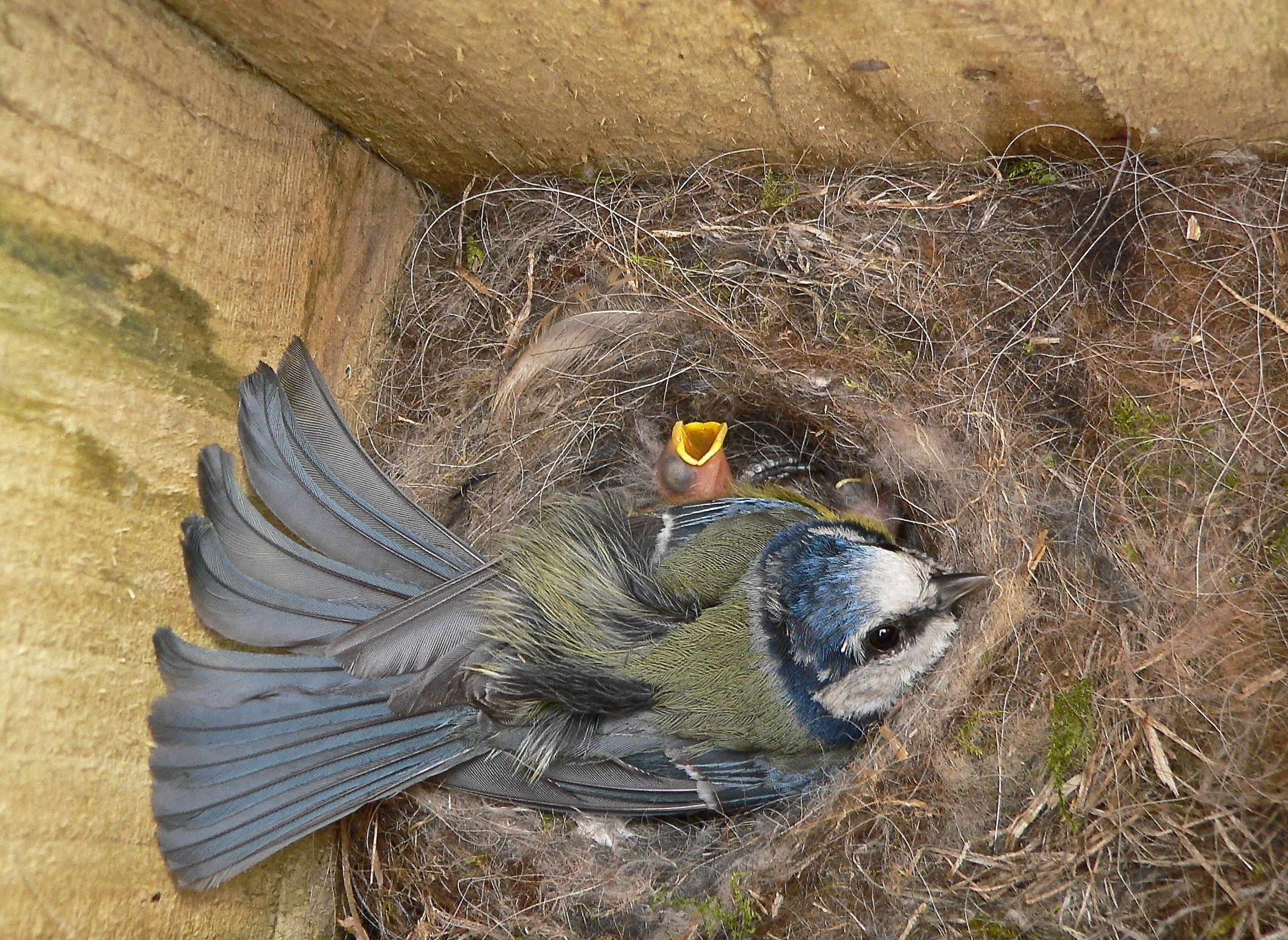
Taken inside a Nestbox

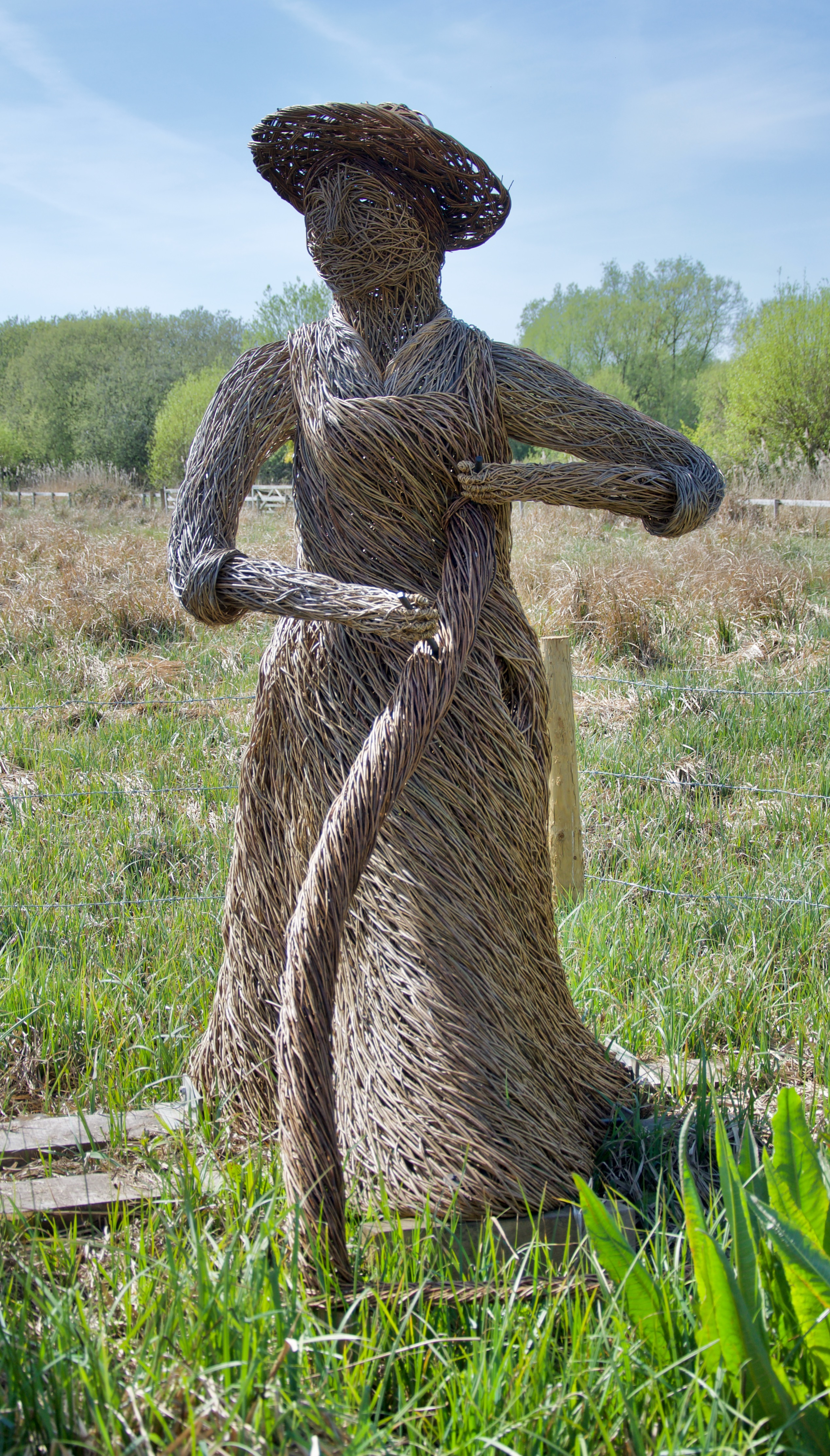
The Binker willow sculpture
