= Maes-yr-Uchaf Wood =

Woodland in Monmouthshire, Wales

- Site of Special Scientific Interest
- Location within Monmouthshire
- Location of Maes-yr-Uchaf Wood.
- Area of search: Monmouthshire
- Grid reference: SO477088
- Coordinates: 51.7760°N 2.7587°W
- Interest: Biological
- Area: 2.5 hectares (0.0250 km^{2}; 0.00965 sq mi)
- Notification date: 1981

Maes-yr-Uchaf Wood is a small woodland and Site of Special Scientific Interest (SSSI), noted for its biological characteristics, in Monmouthshire, south east Wales.

== Geography ==
The 2.5-hectare (6.2-acre) SSSI, notified in 1981, is located within the community of Mitchel Troy, 5 kilometres (3.1 mi) south-west of the town of Monmouth.

The wood is in private ownership and is not open to the public.

== Wildlife and ecology ==
As with other woodland in the Wye Valley Area of Outstanding Natural Beauty, Maes-yr-Uchaf Wood contains many local rare tree species. Maes-yr-Uchaf Wood has an unusual amalgamation of tree species present for Monmouthshire, with ash (Fraxinus excelsior), black alder (Alnus glutinosa) and field maple (Acer campestre) the dominant species.

Other plant life found in the woodland are dog's mercury (Mercurialis perennis), herb paris (Paris quadrifolia) and wood-sorrel (Oxalis acetosella).
