= Lower Hael Wood =

Woodland in Monmouthshire, Wales

Lower Hael
- Site of Special Scientific Interest
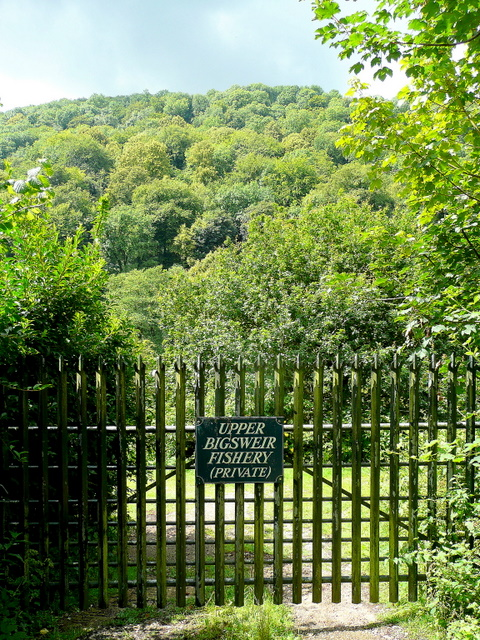
- View of the wood from the English side of River Wye

- Location within Monmouthshire
- Location of Lower Hael.
- Area of search: Monmouthshire
- Grid reference: SO533075
- Coordinates: 51.7643°N 2.6802°W
- Interest: Biological
- Area: 17.6 hectares (0.176 km^{2}; 0.0680 sq mi)
- Notification date: 1981

Lower Hael Wood is a semi-ancient woodland and Site of Special Scientific Interest (SSSI), noted for its biological characteristics, in Monmouthshire, south east Wales. It is part of the wider Hael Woods complex. The wood is on the side of the River Wye which is the border between Wales and England.

== History ==
There is evidence of early human activity on the woodland site, with Bronze Age barrows having been found. Early industry was also present on the site, with a grist mill on the southern slope and evidence of quarries also found.

== Geography ==
The 17.6-hectare (43-acre) SSSI, notified in 1981, is located within the community of Trellech United, on the banks of the River Wye, 3.5 miles (5.6 km) south-east of the town of Monmouth. It is 0.5 miles (0.80 km) south of another SSSI, Graig Wood.

The wood is owned and managed by the Forestry Commission. The Wye Valley Walk which is a long distance footpath, runs along the edge of the woodland, the River Wye and the border with England.

== Wildlife and ecology ==
As with other woodland in the Wye Valley Area of Outstanding Natural Beauty, Lower Hael Wood contains many local and rare tree species. The main tree species found on the site include ash (Fraxinus excelsior), common beech (Fagus sylvatica), small-leaved lime (Tilia cordata) and wych elm (Ulmus glabra), as well as English oak (Quercus robur) and sessile oak (Quercus petraea).

Several insect, bird and other animals have been recorded on the site. Birds include Eurasian sparrowhawks, common sandpipers, long-tailed tits, red-legged partridges, Eurasian skylarks, mallards, greater white-fronted geese and meadow and tree pipits. However the only amphibian found is the common frog.
