= Gaer Wood =

Protected area in Monmouthshire, Wales

- Site of Special Scientific Interest
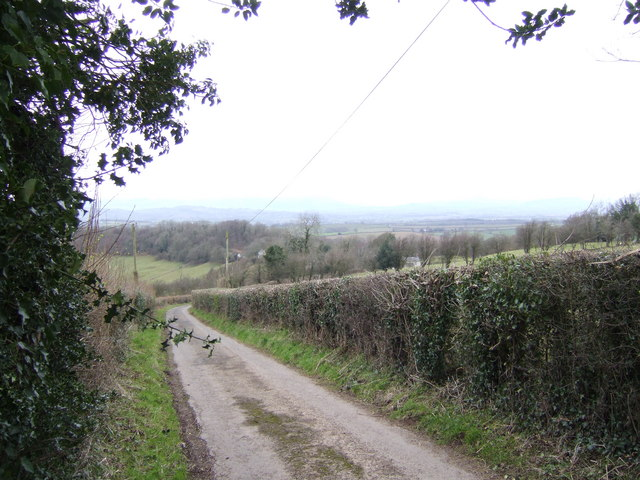
- Road to Gaer Wood, with the woods at the bottom of the hill

- Location within Monmouthshire
- Location of Gaer Wood.
- Area of search: Monmouthshire
- Grid reference: SO464057
- Coordinates: 51.7483°N 2.7763°W
- Interest: Biological
- Area: 13.6 hectares (0.136 km^{2}; 0.0525 sq mi)
- Notification date: 1981

Gaer Wood is a Site of Special Scientific Interest (SSSI), noted for its biological characteristics, in Monmouthshire, south east Wales.

== Geography ==
The 13.6-hectare (34-acre) SSSI, notified in 1981, is located within the community of Trellech United, 4 miles (6.4 km) south of the town of Monmouth. The woodland is privately owned.

== Wildlife and ecology ==
As with other woodland in the Wye Valley Area of Outstanding Natural Beauty, Gaer Wood contains many local and rare tree species. The main species found in the wood are common ash (Fraxinus excelsior), field maple (Acer campestre) and wych elm (Ulmus glabra), along with localised occurrences of beech (Fagus sylvatica).
