= Magor with Undy =

- Community
- Location within Monmouthshire
- Principal area: Monmouthshire
- Country: Wales
- Sovereign state: United Kingdom
- Police: Gwent
- Fire: South Wales
- Ambulance: Welsh
- List of places UK Wales Monmouthshire 51.579°N 2.825°W Map of the community

Magor with Undy is a community on the coast of the Severn Estuary in Monmouthshire, Wales. It includes the villages of Magor and Undy.

The Magor with Undy community was formed in 1986 from the pre-existing communities of Undy and Magor. It has a community council which comprises up to thirteen locally elected or co-opted community councillors from four electoral wards: Denny, Elms, Mills and Salisbury. For elections to Monmouthshire County Council, Magor with Undy is covered by the Mill ward (Magor) and The Elms ward (Undy).
