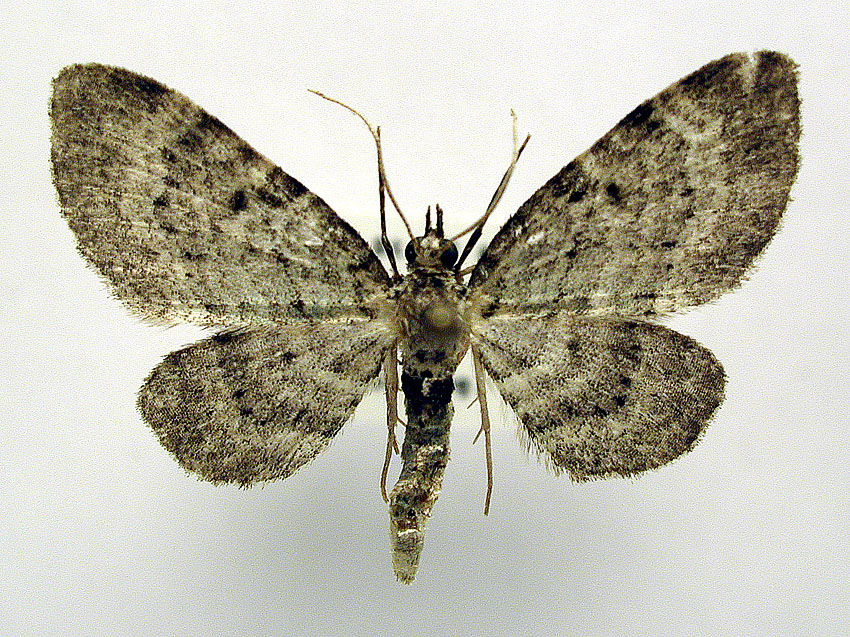

Scientific classification
- Domain: Eukaryota
- Kingdom: Animalia
- Phylum: Arthropoda
- Class: Insecta
- Order: Lepidoptera
- Family: Geometridae
- Genus: Pasiphila
- Species: P. debiliata

Binomial name
- Pasiphila debiliata (Hübner, 1817)

Synonyms
- Geometra debiliata Hübner, [1817]; Eupithecia clerci Krulikovsky, 1891; Eupithecia nigropunctata Chant, 1833; Chlorochlystis suspiciosa Inoue, 1982

= Pasiphila debiliata =

Species of moth

Pasiphila debiliata, the bilberry pug, is a moth of the family Geometridae. It is found from Europe, east to southern Siberia, the Amur region and Japan.

The wingspan is 17–19 millimetres (0.67–0.75 in). The ground colour is a very delicate, evanescent pale green, the crosslines are much weak, strongest on the veins. — ab. nigropunctata Chant, has only the principal lines, these being marked as strong vein-dots. — grisescens Dietze is silvery grey without a tinge of green. Discal spot present.

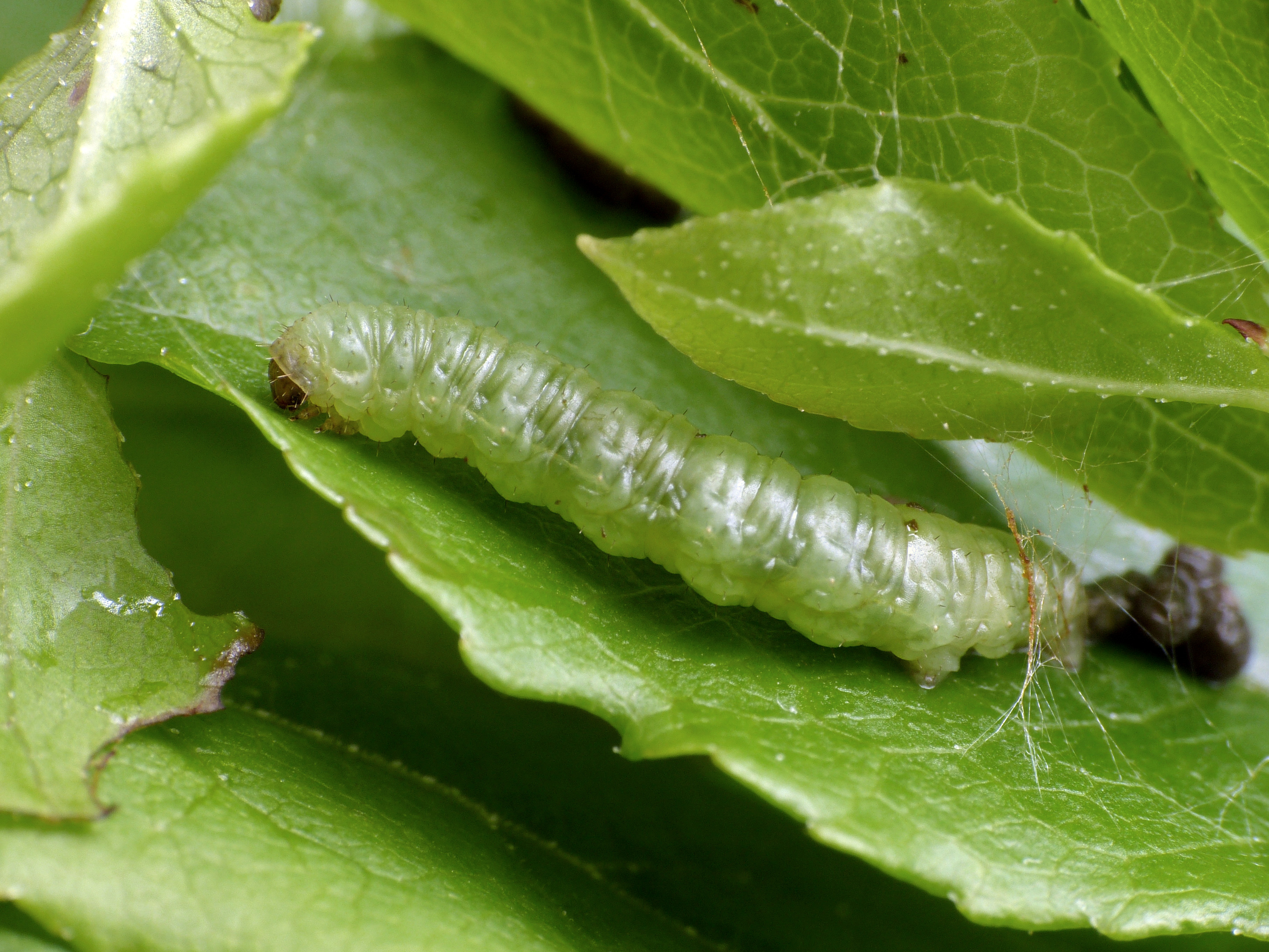
larva

The larva is light green with scattered, fine, pale bristles.

Adults are on wing from June to July.

The larvae feed on Vaccinium myrtillus.
