= Magor, Monmouthshire =

Coordinates: 51.57981°N 2.83121°W

Magor: Welsh: Magwyr
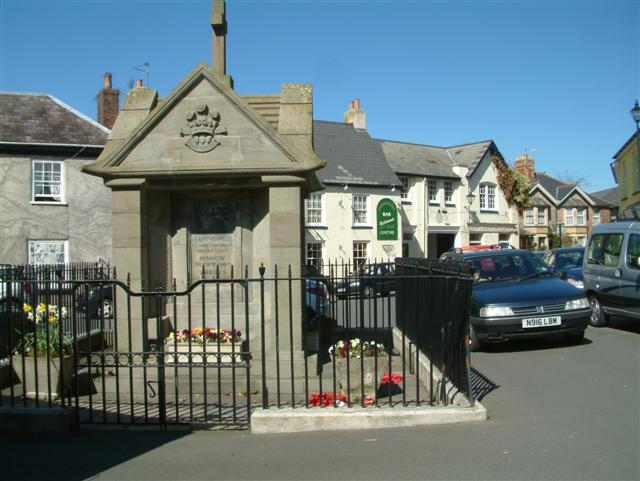
- War memorial in the centre of Magor Square

- Location within Monmouthshire
- Population: 6,140 (2011)
- OS grid reference: ST425871
- Community: Magor with Undy
- Principal area: Monmouthshire
- Preserved county: Gwent
- Country: Wales
- Sovereign state: United Kingdom
- Post town: CALDICOT
- Postcode district: NP26
- Dialling code: 01633
- Police: Gwent
- Fire: South Wales
- Ambulance: Welsh
- UK Parliament: Monmouthshire

Magor (English: /ˈmeɪɡər/; Welsh: Magwyr) is a large village in Monmouthshire, south east Wales, about 9 miles (14 km) west of Chepstow and about 9 miles (14 km) east of Newport. It lies on the Caldicot Levels beside the Severn Estuary, and is in the community of Magor with Undy. Magor lies close to the M4 motorway.

== History ==
The original Welsh language name Magwyr, from which the English name is derived, is thought to originate from the Latin maceria, meaning masonry walls or ruins. It may relate either to a now-lost Roman villa in the area, or alternatively to sea defences or a causeway built by the Romans. Magor and the surrounding area contain many Roman ruins and artefacts, and the village centre was originally located at the inner edge of salt marshes which the Romans began to reclaim as farmland. The local name "Whitewall" may relate to the same causeway, which would have connected the village to a small now-vanished harbour on the Severn Estuary known as Abergwaitha or Aberweytha.

In 1994 the remains of a 13th-century boat, used for trading along and across the Severn Estuary, and perhaps with Ireland, were found buried in the mud of the estuary close to Magor Pill. The boat was found to have been carrying iron ore from Glamorgan.

Magor, as "Magur", is one of the few villages to appear on the Cambriae Typus map of 1573.

== St Mary's Church ==
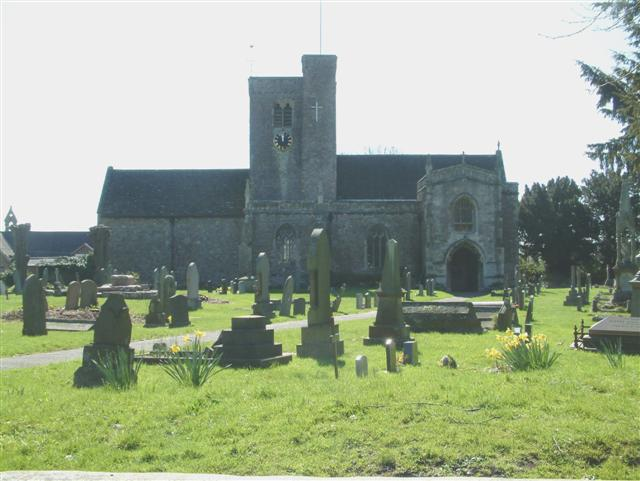
St. Mary's Church, Magor

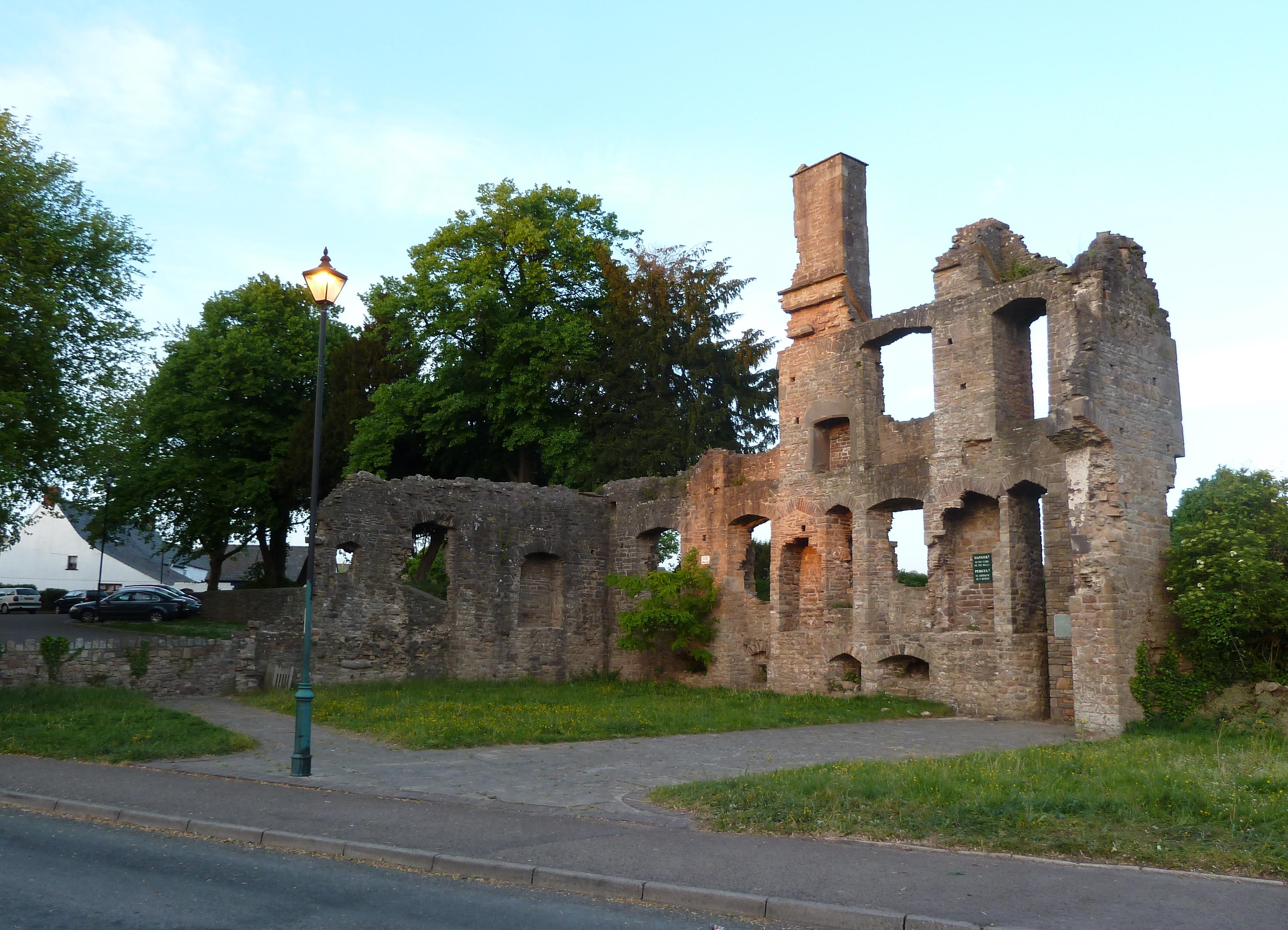
The remains of the Procurator's House

St Marys is a Grade I listed building and is part of the Netherwent Ministry Area.

According to tradition, the parish church was founded in the 7th century, and was originally dedicated to St. Leonard. The existing building has been described as "one of the most ambitious churches in Monmouthshire". The earliest parts of the building date from the 13th century, at about the same time as it was handed by Gilbert Marshal, Earl of Pembroke to the Abbey of Anagni in Italy. It was later administered by Tintern Abbey. The church was greatly extended in the 15th century, and was restored and re-dedicated to St. Mary in the mid-19th century.

Remains of The Procurator's House, some parts of which may date from the 14th century and others from the 16th century, are still standing just off the village square. The procurator was responsible for collecting the tithes of the village on behalf of the abbey.

The church is the burial place of Welsh composer Mansel Thomas (1909–1986).

== Amenities ==
Magor has a thriving village centre containing shops, pubs, restaurants and a Post Office. As well as the large parish church, the village also has a historic Baptist church.

Magor and the neighbouring village of Undy support a thriving athletic club whose clubhouse and pitches are found at the eastern end of the villages. Undy actually consists of all land lying to the north of Magor reen, taking in Dancing Hill where the reen intersects Cowleaze (Magor) to the south and Millfield Park and Mill Reen (Undy) to the north. Vinegar Hill, often regarded as a boundary point between Magor and Undy, actually lies wholly within Undy.

Magor Marsh is a 90 acres (36 ha) wetland reserve managed by the Gwent Wildlife Trust. It has a rich variety of habitats, including damp hay meadows, sedge fen, reedbed, scrub, wet woodland, a large pond and numerous reens. It includes breeding grounds for common snipe, common redshank, reed warbler, grasshopper warbler and Cetti's warbler. It is the richest site in Wales for wetland beetles and soldier-flies, and its pattern of drainage ditches and other features have remained unchanged since the 14th century.

Nearby the village, at Junction 23A of the M4 motorway is Magor services motorway service area, which opened in 1996.

== Development ==
In 2007 a new M4 relief road was proposed for Newport which was to be built to the west of the village utilising the existing motorway junction. These plans were dropped in 2009. From October 2013, a revised draft plan was under consultation, but in June 2019 Mark Drakeford announced that the scheme would not proceed on the basis of escalating costs now at £1.4bn.

Monmouthshire County Council relocated many of its office-based staff to Innovation House at Magor, on the Wales 1 Business Park beside the motorway, in 2011. This followed the need to vacate its offices at the former Gwent County Hall at Croesyceiliog, Cwmbran, due to "concrete cancer" in the building.

== Magor station ==
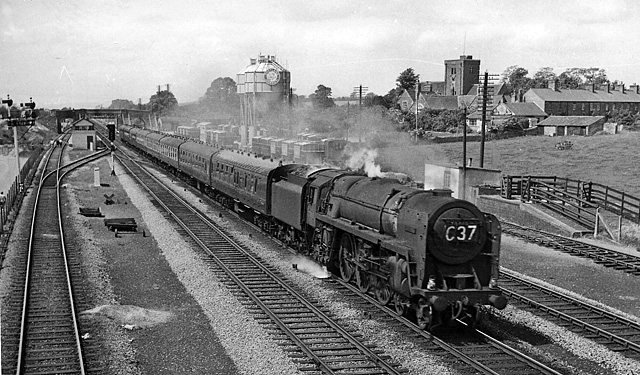
Magor Railway Station on the Great Western Railway in 1961

The South Wales Railway between Swansea and Chepstow (later Gloucester) passed through Magor and a station was opened here in the 1850s, shortly after the line opened. The station provided three sidings serving local farmers.

By the 1920s, traffic on the line was so heavy that refuge sidings were provided on both lines. In 1941 the main line was doubled to four running lines, with the outer two lines as slow goods-only lines to serve the increasing wartime coal traffic, without delaying fast trains on the central main lines.

The station closed, along with Undy Halt, in November 1964; although the goods yard remained open until 1965 for cement trains connected with the building of the M4 motorway.

== Notable people ==
See Category:People from Magor, Monmouthshire
