= Wolvesnewton =

Village in Monmouthshire, Wales

Coordinates: 51.69338°N 2.79133°W

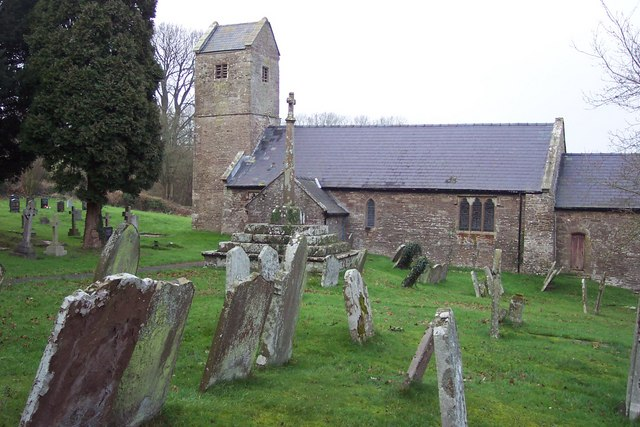
Church of St Thomas à Becket

Wolvesnewton (Welsh: Llanwynell) is a small village in Monmouthshire, Wales.

== Location ==
Wolvesnewton, sometimes historically Wolves Newton, is in the community of Devauden, in Monmouthshire, south east Wales, 6 miles (9.7 km) north west of Chepstow, and between the villages of Devauden and Llangwm. It lies in the traditional Upper Division of the Hundred of Raglan.

== Etymology ==
The village and civil parish took their English name from the family of Lupus (Wolf) or Lovel, who were lords of the manor in the 13th and 14th century.

The official Welsh name, Llanwynell, also found on many maps, is derived from the name of the reputed Saint Gwynell, noted by Lewys Dynn as "Syr Vwniel L. of(f) Wolffs Newton(,) Knight. He accepted the Christian Faith año 188, and erected a church at his own expense." In a list of Welsh parishes circa 1556, and in other later lists, Gwynell is given the parish of Llanwynell or Llanwnell.

== History ==
In the 13th and 14th centuries, the area was held as a manor by the Lupus / Wolff / Lovel family, with their manor house at Cwrt-y-gaer. According to family tradition, they originated in Thuringia and came to the area with the Romans. The village is located to the north of Wentwood, which in Norman times covered a larger area than today. Forest clearances under the Normans led to the establishment of several other "new" villages in the area around the same time, such as Shirenewton about 4 miles (6.4 km) to the south.

=== Church of St Thomas à Becket ===
The parish church is dedicated to St Thomas à Becket who had been killed in 1170 and was canonised three years later. The church largely dates from the 13th century but was substantially restored in 1855–57. It has a 16th-century "saddle-back" roof, and three bells. The north side of the churchyard is locally called the "devil's side" and has no graves. The war memorial in the churchyard incorporates part of a large mediaeval stone cross.

=== Gaer Fawr hill fort ===
The Iron Age hill fort at Gaer Fawr (meaning in Welsh, "great fort"), about 1 mile (1.6 km) south west of Wolvesnewton, is the origin of a second Welsh name for the village, and is one of the largest hill forts in Monmouthshire. That second Welsh name, "Trenewydd Dan-y-Gaer, means "new town under the fort".

== Model Farm and Craft Museum ==
From the 1970s to 1996 the village was the home of the Model Farm Folk Museum and Craft Centre. This was arranged around an actual model farm built for the Duke of Beaufort, with a farmhouse, roundhouse and mill. It was built in 1780, but not fully mapped until after 1841. It was sold by the Beauforts to the then owners of a major local house, Tredean, in 1900, and later sold on to the owner of another major local property, Itton Court. After the museum closure, it was converted into housing.
