= Church of St Thomas à Becket, Wolvesnewton =

Coordinates: 51.694°N 2.791°W

Church of St Thomas à Becket, Monmouthshire
- Church of St Thomas à Becket
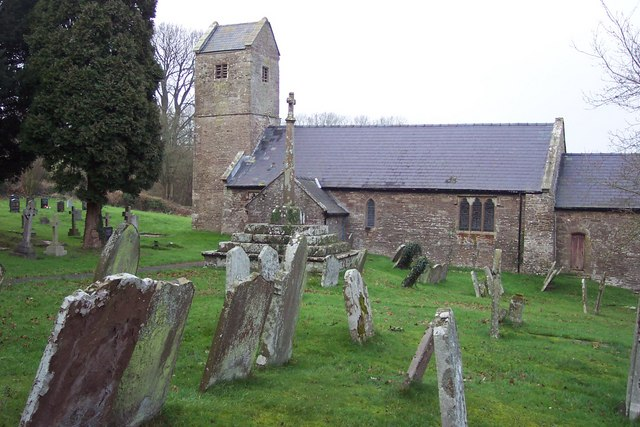
- The church with the war memorial cross in the centre

- Location in Monmouthshire
- Location: Wolvesnewton, Monmouthshire
- Country: Wales
- Denomination: Church in Wales

History
- Status: Parish church
- Founded: c.13th century

Architecture
- Functional status: Active
- Heritage designation: Grade II*
- Designated: 19 August 1955
- Architectural type: Church

Administration
- Diocese: Monmouth
- Archdeaconry: Monmouth
- Deanery: Raglan/Usk
- Parish: Heart of Monmouthshire Ministry Area

Clergy
- Rector: Rev’d Canon Sally Ingle-Gillis

The Church of Saint Thomas à Becket in Wolvesnewton, Monmouthshire, Wales has its origins in the 13th century. Restored in the 19th century, it remains an active parish church. St Thomas's is a Grade II* listed building. The medieval churchyard cross was restored as a First World War memorial in 1920 and has its own Grade II* listing.

== History ==
The earliest record of the church dates from 1254. The west window of the tower dates from this time. Reconstruction was undertaken by John Norton in 1855–1857. The church remains an active parish church in the deanery of Raglan-Usk.

== Architecture and description ==
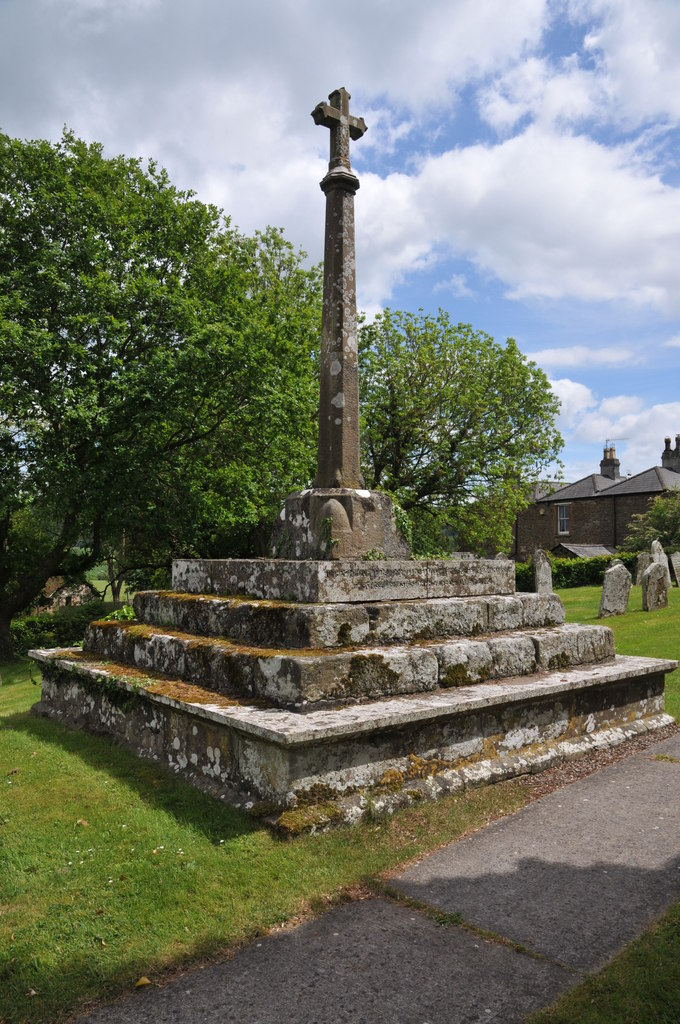
The churchyard cross

The church is constructed of Old red sandstone blocks. The roof is of Welsh slate. The whole is listed Grade II*.

The interior is plain and whitewashed, with decoration mainly from the Victorian era. Opinions differ as to John Norton's Victorian reconstruction, the architectural historian John Newman describing it as "drastic", while Cadw considers it a "sensitive restoration". The church has some notable stained glass from the 20th century which John Newman suggests formed a memorial to the dead of World War II. Cadw also records this, although the University of Wales Centre for Advanced Welsh and Celtic Studies catalogue of church stained glass disagrees, indicating that the windows were a memorial to a member of the Hood family of Tredean House, Devauden. All agree that the windows were undertaken by the firm of Thomas W. Camm, mainly by Camm's daughter Florence.

=== Wolvesnewton churchyard cross ===
The churchyard contains a medieval cross, probably of 15th century origin. Around 1920, the cross was reconstructed as a memorial to the local dead of the First World War. The base and the cross which tops the structure are 20th century in date, while the shaft and two of the steps are medieval. The whole is constructed in limestone and has a Grade II* listing.
