= Nathan Rogers (writer) =

- Born: 30 May 1638; Llanvaches, Monmouthshire, Wales
- Died: After 1708
- Occupations: Landowner; lawyer; politician; writer
- Known for: Involvement in 'Wentwood Riots' of 1678; Writing Memoirs of Monmouthshire

Nathan Rogers (30 May 1638 – after 1708) was a landowner, lawyer, politician and writer in Monmouthshire, Wales. He is notable for his radical polemic Memoirs of Monmouth-Shire..., published in 1708 and later known as The Secret Memoirs of Monmouthshire.

== Early years ==
He was the son of Wroth Rogers of Llanvaches, who had been a colonel in the Parliamentarian New Model Army under Oliver Cromwell, and who claimed descent from the Vaughan family of Tretower Court. Nathan Rogers matriculated from St John's College, Oxford in July 1655, and in 1659 was briefly a member of the Third Protectorate Parliament, representing Hereford. He became the lord of two manors in Monmouthshire, with his seat on the south side of Mynydd Alltir Fach (or "Money Turvey") near Llanvaches. He also qualified as a lawyer, and became steward of the manor of Caldicot in the 1670s.

== The Wentwood Forest case ==
In 1678, the Marquis of Worcester, Henry Somerset, as Lord Lieutenant of Monmouthshire and Governor of Chepstow Castle, enclosed some 3,000 acres (1,200 ha) of the Wentwood forest for his own use, and began to fell trees for use in his ironworks at Tintern. Wentwood was not a royal forest, but had been owned by the Marcher Lords of Striguil. Worcester made no attempt to investigate the rights of the commoners, and offered no compensation before starting to enclose. The tenants of the area, including Rogers, claimed that the ancient rights to the forest belonged to them, and rioted when 50 armed men of Worcester's arrived to carry away the felled wood. The leaders of the riot, including Rogers and Edward Kemys, were arrested and tried at Monmouth, where they were found guilty and fined.

Worcester remained dissatisfied, however, and claimed to the House of Lords that the rioters had breached parliamentary privilege by rioting. Rogers and Kemys were then re-arrested and imprisoned in London. Worcester also ordered troops to be deployed in the forest to protect his timber. The issue came to the House of Commons, where Worcester's actions were supported by some, and the issue became highly politicised. By the end of 1681, Worcester had been elevated to the position of Duke of Beaufort, and several of his opponents in Parliament had themselves been arrested on charges of libel and imprisoned.

== Memoirs of Monmouth-Shire ==
By 1695 Rogers had been obliged to sell his lands, and later lived at Llanmartin. In 1708, he published Memoirs of Monmouth-Shire, anciently called Gwent, and by the Saxons, Gwentland..... This was ostensibly a topographical and historical survey of the county, but was most notable for its appendix, Of the Case of Wentwood with the severe usage and sufferings of the Tenants in the late reigns for defending their Rights. This vigorously worded diatribe aimed to stir up discontent against the Duke of Beaufort, who Rogers claimed had removed from local people their ancient rights in Wentwood. He exhorted the remaining tenants in Wentwood to throw off their "yoke of bondage" and reclaim their ancient rights. The 2nd Duke of Beaufort reputedly bought almost every copy of the book, and destroyed them to prevent their circulation, resulting in the book's great rarity.

Rogers' pamphlet became known as The Secret Memoirs of Monmouthshire after it was mentioned by Archdeacon William Coxe in his History of Monmouthshire in 1802. It was reprinted several times, first by Samuel Etheridge of Newport in 1826 and again by J.H. Clark of Usk in his Sketches of Monmouthshire in 1868.
