= Old Wye Bridge, Chepstow =

Old Wye Bridge
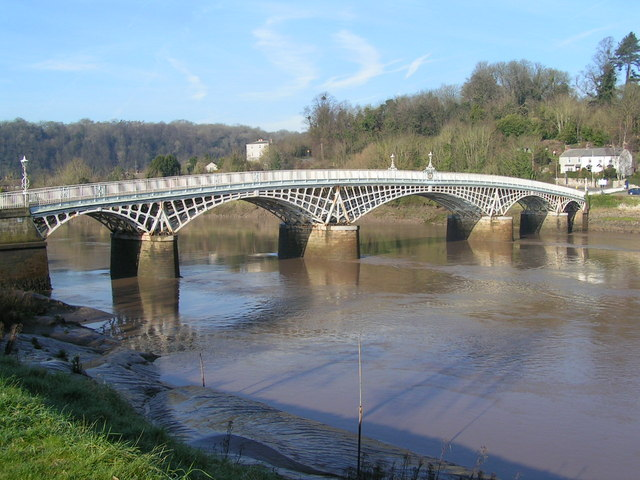
- Coordinates: 51.646306°N 2.671944°W
- Crosses: River Wye
- Locale: Chepstow, Monmouthshire; Tutshill, Gloucestershire

Characteristics
- Material: Cast iron, stone
- Total length: 106 metres (116 yd)
- No. of spans: 5

History
- Designer: John Rastrick
- Construction end: 1816
- Replaces: Earlier, wooden bridge

Location
- Interactive map of Old Wye Bridge

The Old Wye Bridge or Town Bridge at Chepstow, known historically as Chepstow Bridge, crosses the River Wye between Monmouthshire in Wales and Gloucestershire in England, close to Chepstow Castle. Although there had been earlier wooden bridges on the site since Norman times, the current road bridge was constructed of cast iron in 1816 during the Regency period, by John Rastrick of Bridgnorth, who greatly modified earlier plans by John Rennie.

The bridge crosses a river with one of the highest tidal ranges in the world. It carried the main A48 road between Newport and Gloucester until 1988, when a new road bridge was opened downstream alongside Chepstow Railway Bridge. Before its temporary closure in 2025, the road bridge carried local traffic between Chepstow and Tutshill. It is a Grade I listed building.

== Earlier structures ==
Before the Roman period, the crossing of the Wye farthest downstream was at Tintern. The Romans built a crossing some 1 kilometre (0.62 mi) upstream of the current bridge at Chepstow, and this is thought to have continued in use for centuries thereafter. There was a small hospital and chapel dedicated to St. David on the Gloucestershire side of the bridge, which was described as ruined in 1573. Some remains of the Roman bridge were revealed in 1911 by Dr. Orville Owen during his excavations in the river bed.

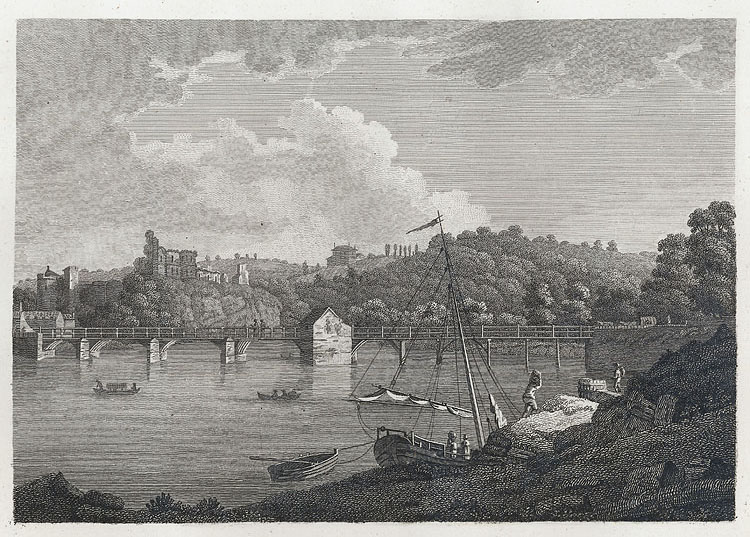
The stone and wooden bridge, before 1816

After the Normans established a castle at Chepstow (then known as Striguil), a wooden bridge was constructed across the river at or close to its current site. The first records of a bridge at Chepstow date from 1228. The wooden bridge is known to have been replaced several times. Rebuilding was made difficult by the tidal range, requiring ten 40-foot-high (12 m) timber piers, perhaps the highest in the country at the time. Records from 1399 describe it as "feeble and ruinous and on the point of being lost", and a new bridge built in 1546 was described less than thirty years later as having "fallen into great ruin and decay and likely to fall." In 1576, an act of Parliament, the Chepstow Bridge Act 1575 (18 Eliz. 1. c. 18) (the first act to make specific reference to Monmouthshire) was passed making Gloucestershire and Monmouthshire responsible for the repair of their respective halves; there are records of payments made by Gloucestershire parishes to help maintain the bridge until the 19th century.

Neglect continued, however, and in 1605 it was said that the bridge was again "broken, fallen down and quite carried away with the Stream... whereby the said Passage and Highway is utterly taken away..." Under new legislation that year it was agreed that the bridge be maintained by a special "bridge money" tax levied on the residents of the two counties. For the next two centuries each county appointed a surveyor responsible for either end of the bridge. Apart from one stone pier in the centre, the bridge was entirely built of wood. The bridge was purposely destroyed by the Royalists during the Civil War in 1644, but was rebuilt by 1647. It was seriously damaged by storms in 1703, and again by high water in 1738, but was repaired both times. William Cole wrote of the bridge in 1746 that it was "the lightest in England, and the highest from the water." A suggestion in 1768 that the two counties should share the cost of building a new bridge failed because Monmouthshire – a smaller and less prosperous county than Gloucestershire – considered it unreasonable that it should pay half the cost. However, in 1785, the wooden piers on the Monmouthshire side were rebuilt as four stone arches, although the Gloucestershire half remained timber until 1815.

== The 1816 bridge ==
In 1810 the bridge was again declared to be "in decay" and dangerous, and local magistrates commissioned engineer John Rennie, the architect of Waterloo Bridge in London, to design a new bridge. Rennie's designs, at an estimated cost of £41,890 (equivalent to £2,840,000 in 2025), were considered to be too expensive, but action was eventually taken after a ship collided with the wooden bridge in 1812, demolishing part of it and causing six deaths. The foundation stone for the new bridge was laid on 13 April 1813. In 1814 the contract to build the bridge was let to the Bridgnorth firm of Hazeldine, Rastrick & Co., at a cost of £17,850, less than half that of Rennie's estimate.

The bridge was designed by John Rastrick, in a style apparently inspired by the work of Thomas Telford. It was made of cast iron in five arches, cast at Bridgnorth, with a centre span of 34 metres (112 ft), intermediate spans of 21 metres (69 ft), and outer spans of 10 metres (33 ft). The bridge was opened on 24 July 1816, with an elaborate ceremony.

The bridge is the largest iron arch road bridge remaining from the first half-century of iron and steel construction, before the technological innovation of suspension bridges. It is described by architectural historian John Newman as "a supremely elegant composition of five shallow segmental lattice arches carrying the gently curved roadway... This superstructure rests on reassuringly strong tapering piers of squared ashlar...". Ornate ironwork on the bridge marks the boundary point between the two counties of Gloucester and Monmouth. The cast iron lamp posts were bought from Sheffield City Council and installed in 1969. The bridge is a Grade I listed building. (Note: The bridge has two Grade I listings, for its Welsh side, and for its English side.)

Carrying the main road between Gloucester and South Wales, the bridge became a notorious bottleneck and was strengthened several times. The bridge was first strengthened in 1889, and there were major structural repairs in 1979. It was superseded, except for local traffic, by the A48 road bridge opened in January 1988.

The bridge now carries local traffic on the unclassified road between Chepstow and Tutshill, and is controlled by traffic signals at each end. It was closed to vehicle traffic for several months in 2015, for maintenance work for the bridge's bicentenary in July 2016. A member of the group coordinating the commemoration arrangements described the bridge as "the finest Georgian Regency arch bridge in Britain and the world," and suggested that it should be proposed for World Heritage Site status. The bicentenary celebrations included a re-enactment of the original opening ceremony, with speeches from local civic leaders and Sir John Armitt, the president of the Institution of Civil Engineers.

=== Closure ===
On 1 October 2025 the bridge was closed to all vehicular traffic with immediate effect, after a crack was discovered in one of the iron beams during a routine inspection. Further examination by specialist engineers in March 2026 identified several new cracks in the cast iron structure, and on 27 March 2026 the bridge was immediately closed to all users, including pedestrians, on safety grounds. Monmouthshire County Council, who are responsible for the bridge, stated that they would continue to work with engineers to find solutions. The bridge was reopened for pedestrians and cyclists in mid June 2026, but was temporarily closed again on 23 June due to extreme heat.

== See also ==
- List of crossings of the River Wye

== Gallery ==
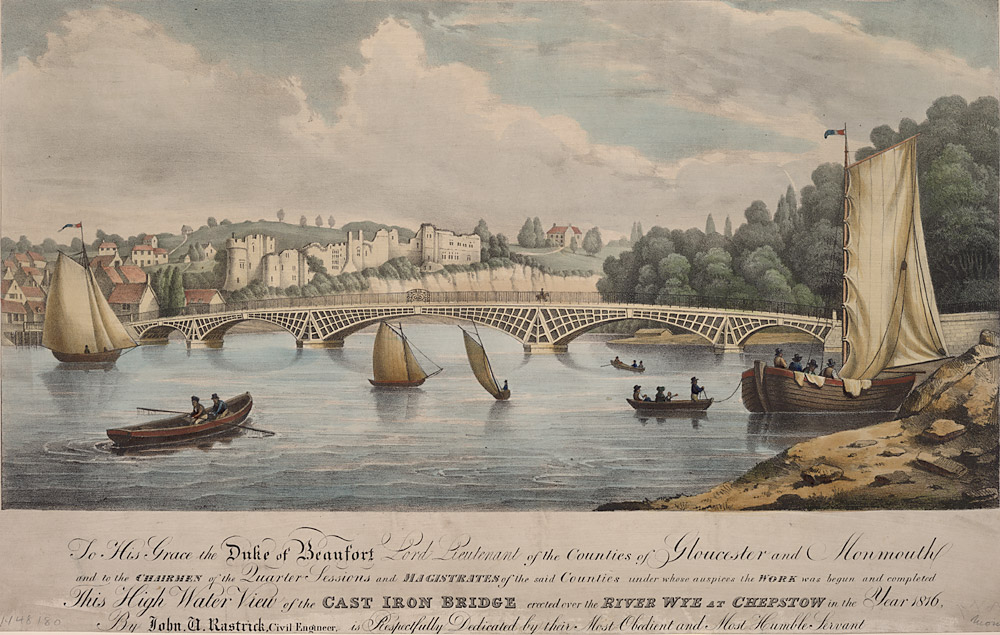
A view of the bridge, c.1820

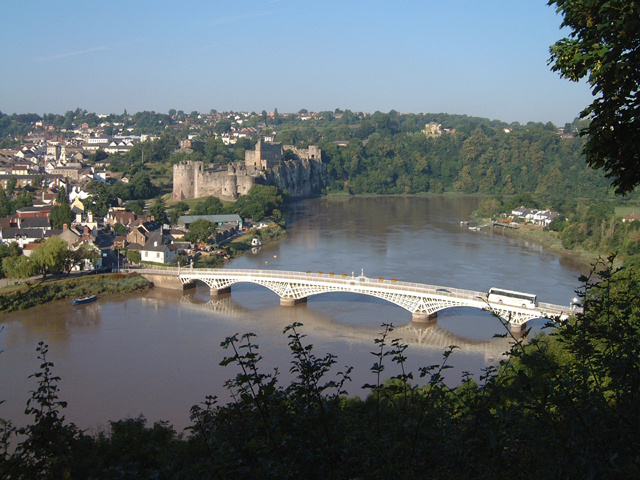
The bridge and Chepstow Castle, viewed from Tutshill

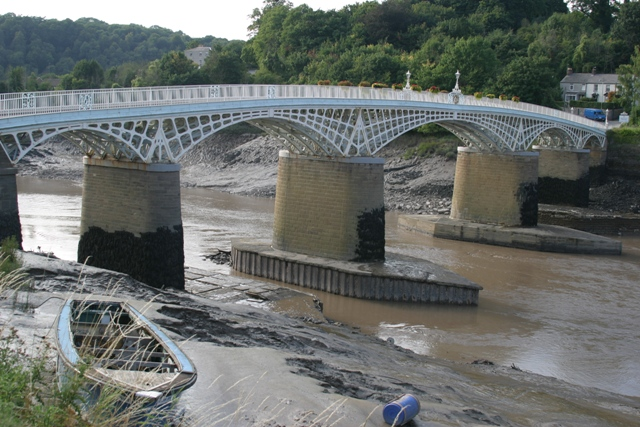
Low tide

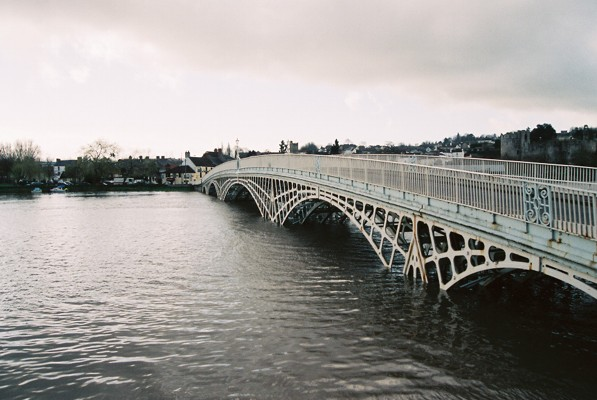
An abnormally high tide

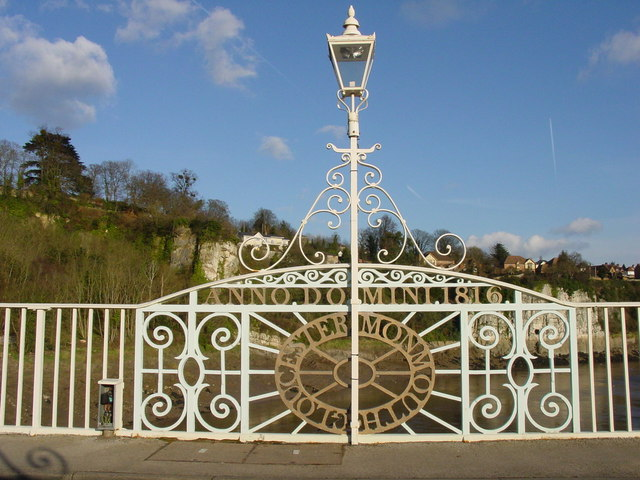
Decorative ironwork in the centre of the bridge, showing the Monmouthshire-Gloucestershire boundary line
