= Itton =

Coordinates: 51.652391°N 2.732212°W

Itton: Welsh: Llanddinol
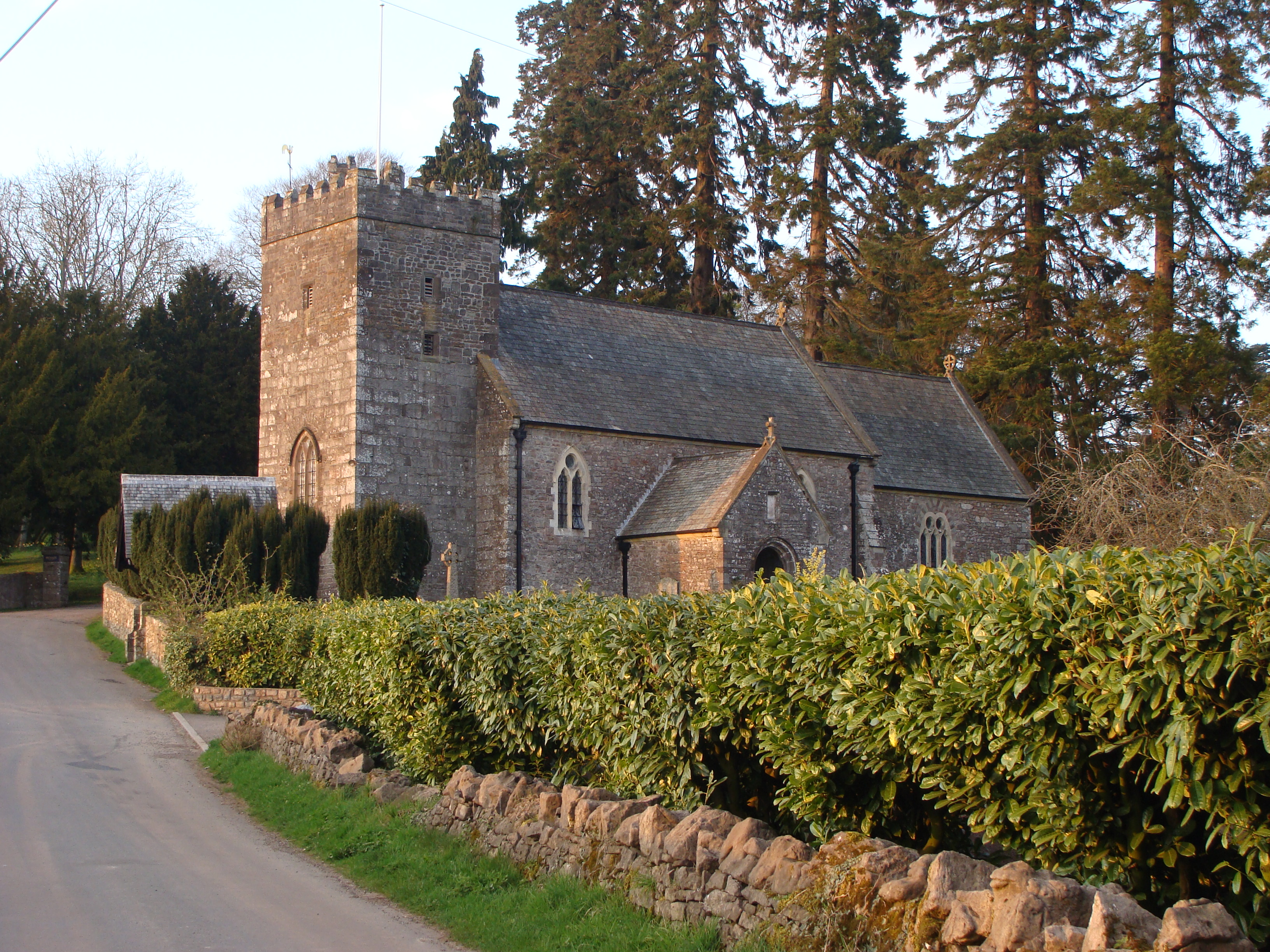
- St Deiniol's Church, Itton

- Location within Monmouthshire
- Population: 213
- OS grid reference: ST493951
- Principal area: Monmouthshire
- Preserved county: Gwent
- Country: Wales
- Sovereign state: United Kingdom
- Post town: CHEPSTOW
- Postcode district: NP16
- Dialling code: 01291
- Police: Gwent
- Fire: South Wales
- Ambulance: Welsh
- UK Parliament: Monmouth
- Senedd Cymru – Welsh Parliament: Monmouth

Itton (Welsh: Llanddinol), is a small village in Monmouthshire, south-east Wales, in the community of Devauden about 3 miles (4.8 km) north-west of Chepstow. The village covers about a 2-mile (3.2 km) radius, with about 70 properties across a rural area. The parish also includes the hamlet of Howick.

The church and Itton Court, the manor house, are located about 1-mile (1.6 km) from the main housing development at Itton Common on the B4293 road between Chepstow and Devauden. The woodland between Itton and Devauden is Chepstow Park Wood.

== History ==
The Welsh language name for the village derives from the dedication of the parish church to St. Deiniol, a 6th-century bishop. The English name first appears in records in the 13th century, as Edyton, Hedyngton or Edeton.

The parish church building itself is Grade II listed building dating in part from the 14th century although it was mostly rebuilt in 1869. The church stands beside Itton Court, originally a mediaeval fortalice of the Lords of Striguil or Chepstow. The fortified manor house was later extended. The eastern front was built for the house's owner, John Jeffries, in the early 18th century. In 1749 the house was bought by John Curre whose family extended it and rebuilt parts, particularly in the late 19th century.

== The Curre Hunt ==
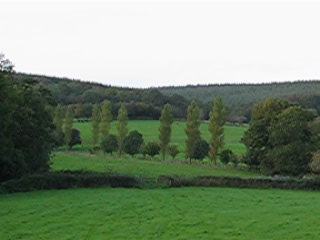
Countryside near Itton

The Curre Hunt was started in 1896 by Sir Edward Curre of Itton Court. He began by buying foxhounds from the old Chepstow Hunt and building hunt kennels at Itton. The Curre country covers some 200 square miles (520 km^{2}) between Chepstow and Usk and is bordered on the south by the Severn Estuary with the River Wye to the east. The Curre Hunt was well known nationally for their 'All White Pack'. All the foxhounds were bred to be white, although following the fairly recent amalgamation of the Curre and Llangibby hunts this characteristic has largely faded out; many of the dogs are still white but there are some coloured beagle-like dogs too.

== Nearby places ==
Chepstow - 3 miles away from the Common
Howick - nearby settlement 1 mile away from the common
Devauden - local village - 1.5 miles away
Shirenewton -local village - 2 miles away
