= Newchurch, Monmouthshire =

Coordinates: 51.67460°N 2.78958°W

Newchurch: Welsh: Yr Eglwys Newydd ar y Cefn
- Location within Monmouthshire
- OS grid reference: ST454976
- Principal area: Monmouthshire
- Preserved county: Gwent
- Country: Wales
- Sovereign state: United Kingdom
- Post town: CHEPSTOW
- Postcode district: NP16
- Dialling code: 01291
- Police: Gwent
- Fire: South Wales
- Ambulance: Welsh
- UK Parliament: Monmouth

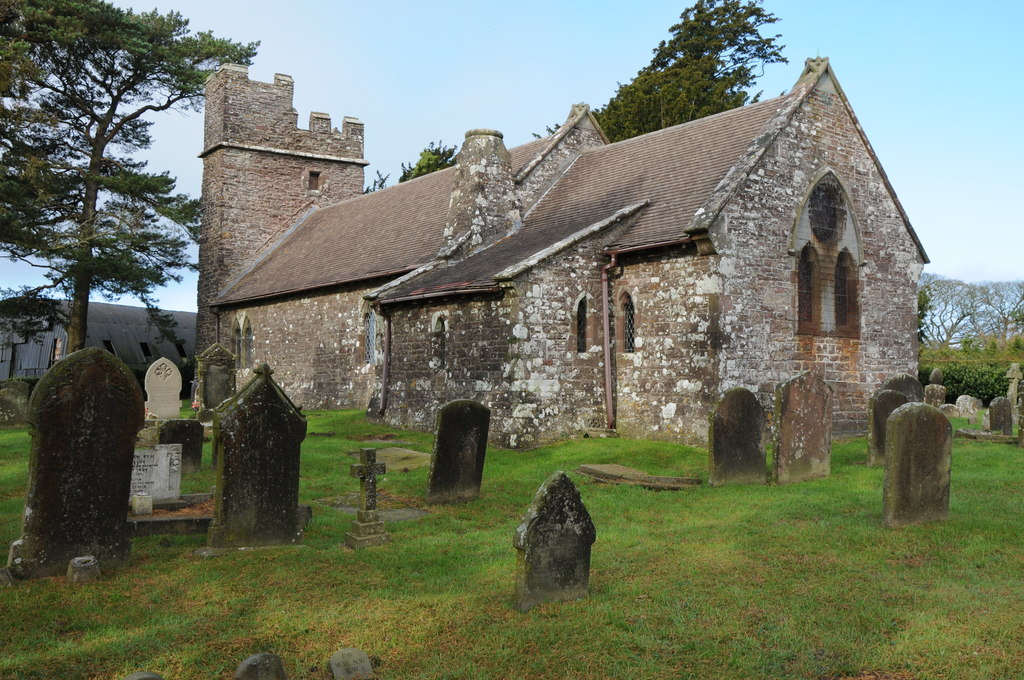
St Peter's Church, Newchurch, rebuilt from 1863-4

Newchurch (Welsh: Yr Eglwys Newydd ar y Cefn, meaning "new church on the ridge") is an extensive rural parish and small hamlet in Monmouthshire, south east Wales. It is located 6 miles south east of Usk and 6 miles north west of Chepstow, between the B4235 and B4293 roads.

== History and amenities ==
Before the Norman conquest of south-east Wales, the area was heavily forested as part of Wentwood. There is a Neolithic dolmen or burial chamber at Gaer-llwyd, 1 mile south west of the village close to the B4235.

In the early 12th century the Newchurch area was known as Plataland and was given by the Marcher lord of Striguil, or Chepstow, to Tintern Abbey. The monks cleared much of the land for farming, but in 1302 exchanged it with Roger Bigod, Earl of Norfolk, for land at Woolaston in what is now Gloucestershire. The parish still contains much of Wentwood and also, to the east, Chepstow Park Wood south of Devauden.

Bigod built a church for the tenants of his land, which became known as Newchurch. The parish church is dedicated to St. Peter. It has some 14th-century features but was largely rebuilt around 1865.

The modern hamlet consists of little more than the church, three houses and a farm.

=== Cas Troggy ===
Cas (or Castell) Troggy is a small ruined fortified hunting lodge or manor house built by Roger Bigod around 1303. It is located within Newchurch parish, beside the Troggy (or Castrogi) Brook and the old road between Chepstow and Usk, on the northern slopes of Wentwood at Pen y cae-mawr. It was probably abandoned shortly after Bigod's death in 1306. The 16th century antiquarian William Camden incorrectly referred to the ruins as Striguil, a mistake repeated on some later maps.
