= Itton Court =

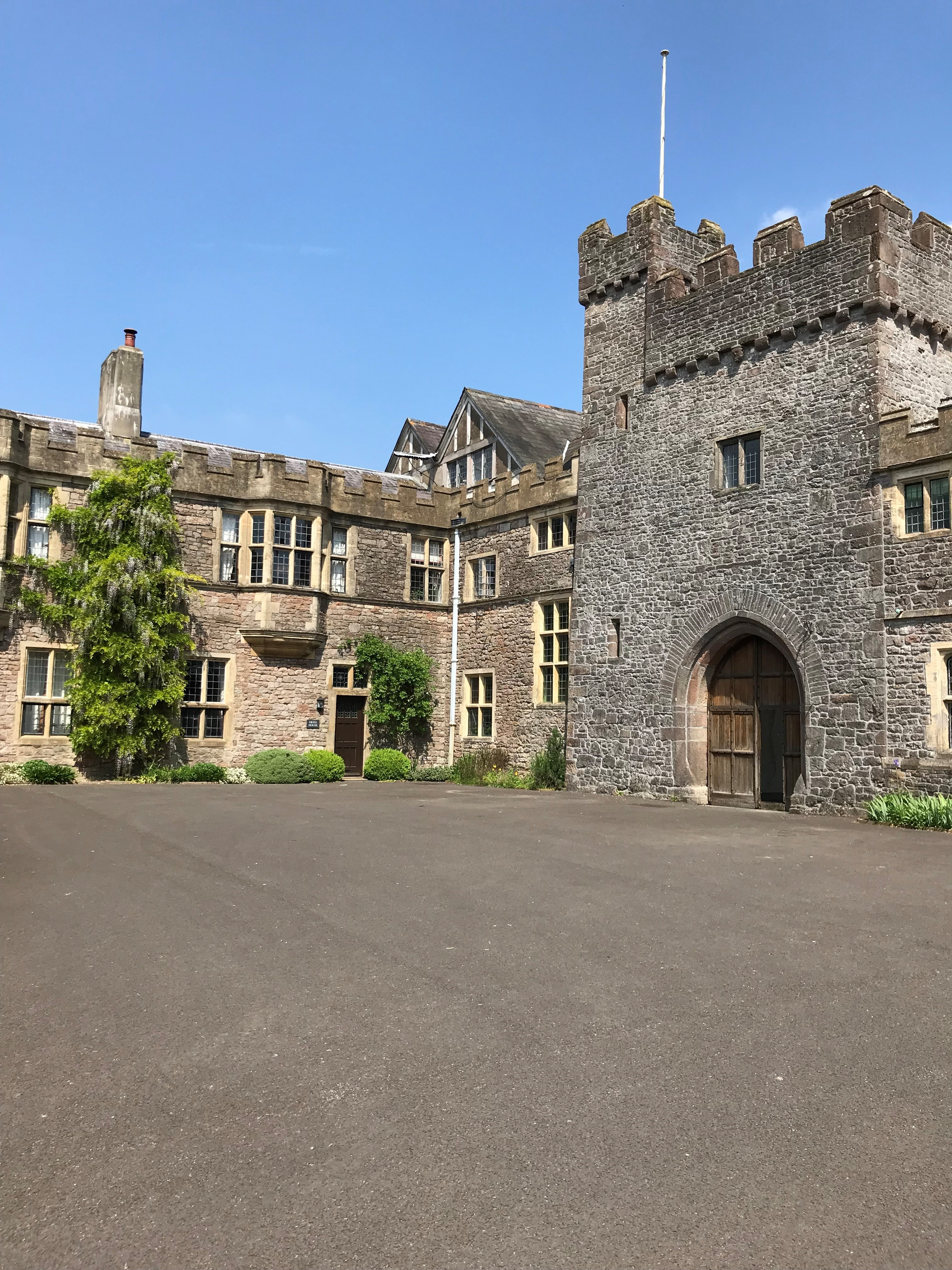
- View of the 14th century tower and adjacent wings by Sir Guy Dawber c.1894

- Location within Monmouthshire

General information
- Type: Country house
- Location: Itton, Wales
- Coordinates: 51°39′20″N 2°44′1″W

Design and construction
- Designations: Grade II* listed / Cadw/ICOMOS Register of Parks and Gardens of Special Historic Interest in Wales

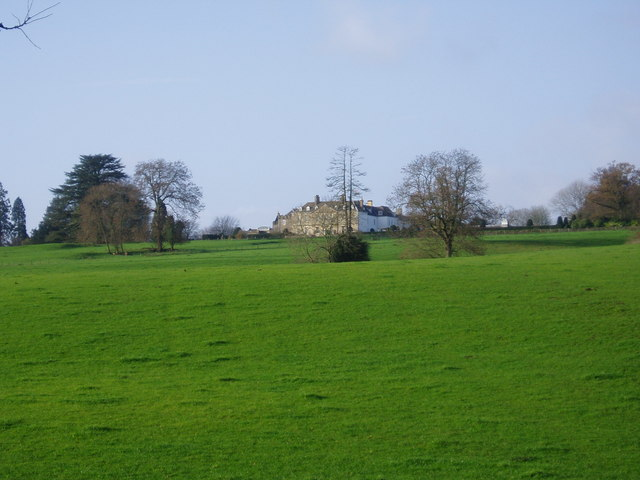
A distant view of the court

Itton Court, Itton, Devauden, Monmouthshire is a country house. The origin of the house was as an outstation for Chepstow Castle. In the 18th century, much of the medieval manor was pulled down and replaced. Further additions and alterations were made in the 19th and 20th centuries, including work by Guy Dawber. From the 18th until the mid-20th century, the court was the home of the Curre family, major landowners, who purchased the estate in 1749. It is a Grade II* listed building and its gardens are listed on the Cadw/ICOMOS Register of Parks and Gardens of Special Historic Interest in Wales.

== History ==
The original medieval manor was a fortified outstation for Chepstow Castle. The gate house, of a 14th-century date is all that remains of the earlier building. In 1749, the court and estate were purchased by the Curre family. The Curres pulled down the remainder of the house, with the exception of a recently constructed wing in the William and Mary style, and built an almost entirely new house in the current Queen Anne style. In the late 19th and early 20th centuries, Sir Guy Dawber, an architect noted for his Arts and Crafts work in the Cotswolds was employed to undertake significant renovations and rebuilding. His work included a "very grand" billiard room and a long gallery. The house remained the home of the Curres until the death of the last Lady Curre in 1956. It was then sold and was subsequently divided into apartments.

Famed Canadian author Gabrielle Roy described having spent time at Itton Court in 1938-1939 in her autobiography La Détresse et l'enchantement (Enchantment and Sorrow).

== Architecture and description ==
The building history of the house is "extremely complex." The remnants of the medieval gate tower are mixed with late nineteenth century reconstructions. The architectural historian John Newman considers the East front to be "one of the most distinguished in the county." The house is broadly rectangular, with two storeys and seven bays. The interiors are almost unchanged from their late 19th century designs.

The house is a Grade II* listed building, recognising its important historical development and its "fine interiors." The park and gardens surrounding the house are registered at Grade II on the Cadw/ICOMOS Register of Parks and Gardens of Special Historic Interest in Wales as important survivals with landscaping features from the 17th to the 19th centuries.
