= Devauden =

Village in Wales

Devauden: Welsh: Y Dyfawden
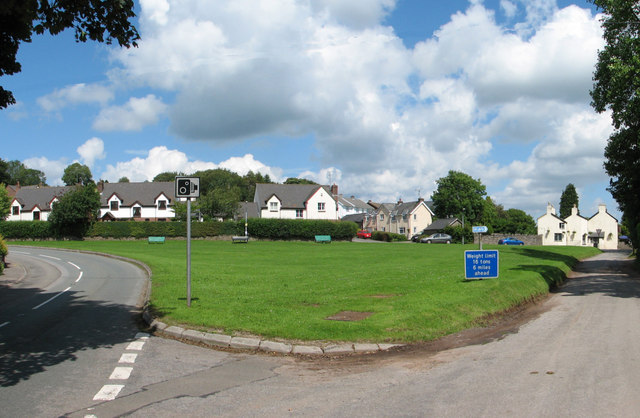
- The village green at Devauden

- Location within Monmouthshire
- Population: 1,040 (2011)
- OS grid reference: ST483990
- Principal area: Monmouthshire
- Preserved county: Gwent
- Country: Wales
- Sovereign state: United Kingdom
- Post town: CHEPSTOW
- Postcode district: NP16
- Dialling code: 01291
- Police: Gwent
- Fire: South Wales
- Ambulance: Welsh
- UK Parliament: Monmouth
- Senedd Cymru – Welsh Parliament: Monmouth
- List of places UK Wales Monmouthshire 51.68736°N 2.74927°W Map of the community

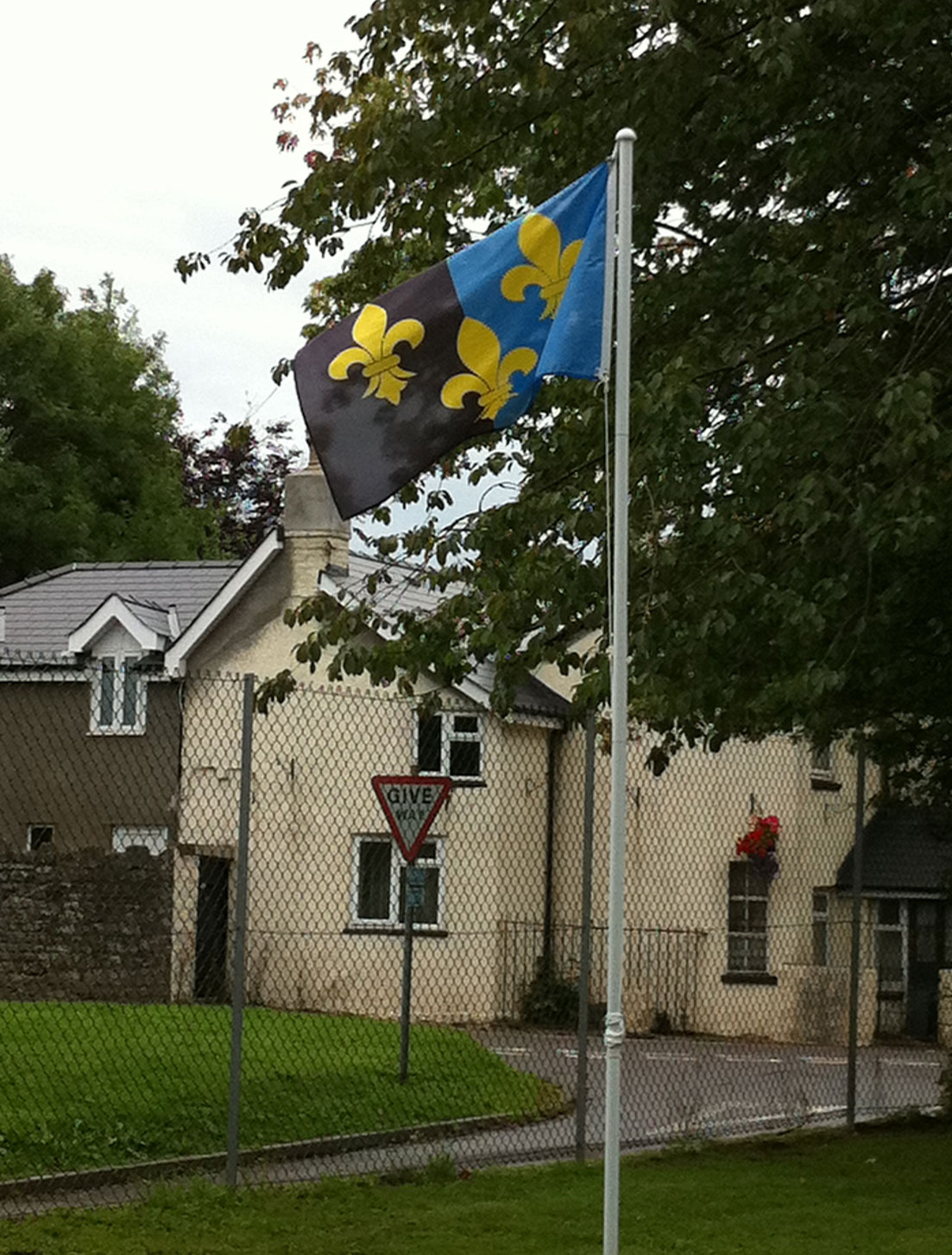
the Flag of Monmouthshire flying at the Hood Memorial Hall with the Mason's Arms pub in the background

Devauden (Welsh: Y Dyfawden) is a village and community in Monmouthshire, southeast Wales. It is located between Chepstow and Monmouth near the top of the Trellech ridge on the B4293 road. The community covers an area of 3,790 hectares (14.6 mi^{2}), and includes the villages of Itton and Wolvesnewton, Llanfihangel-tor-y-mynydd and Newchurch.

== History ==
There is evidence that an ancient ridgeway between Monmouth and the coast at Mathern passed through Devauden. Roman coins from the period of Antoninus Pius were found in the village in 1840.

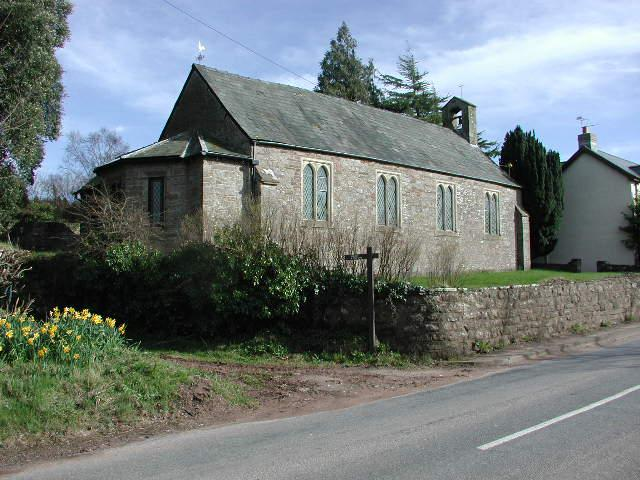
The church of St James

Devauden was said in the Anglo-Saxon Chronicle to have been the place where the Britons were overwhelmed and defeated by the combined forces of the Anglo-Saxon monarchs, Æthelbald of Mercia and Cuthred of Wessex, in 743. The name may be derived from the Welsh Ty'r ffawydden, or "house of the beech tree". Until the mid-20th century the village was often known as The Devauden.

Devauden and the nearby hamlet of Fedw or Veddw (from Welsh Y fedw, birch grove) were originally clusters of illicit cottages built as a base by woodcutters, mule drivers, quarrymen and labourers linked to the wireworks at Tintern and the Angiddy valley. The village was historically part of the parish of Newchurch.

On 15 October 1739, John Wesley preached his first sermon in Wales on the village green at Devauden. He wrote in his journal: "Upon a pressing invitation, some time since received, I set out for Wales. About four in the afternoon I preached on a little green at the foot of the Devauden ... to three or four hundred plain people on "Christ our wisdom, righteousness, sanctification, and redemption." After sermon, one who I trust is an old disciple of Christ willingly received us into his house.."

James Davies (1765–1849) was schoolmaster at Devauden for over 30 years during the early 19th century and was responsible for establishing a village school in 1815. In 1830 the school was converted into a chapel and a new schoolroom was built next door. Davies gained a strong local reputation for enduring personal hardship in order to help the poor in the community. The school closed in 1986. The small parish church is dedicated to St. James.

Devauden Manor, originally known as Tredean, is a Grade II* listed Arts and Crafts style house dating from 1902.

== Demographics ==
Devauden's population was 1040, according to the 2011 census; a 7.44% increase since the 968 people noted in 2001.

The 2011 census showed 11.4% of the population could speak Welsh, a rise from 5.8% in 2001.

== Governance ==
An electoral ward in the same name exists. This ward stretches from Devauden to Llangwm. The total ward population taken at the 2011 census was 1,480.

A field of three acres (1.2 ha) called "Crooked Billet", north of the village on the B4293 road, used to be part of the county of Herefordshire. It was transferred to the Monmouthshire in 1844.

== Chepstow Park Wood ==
Chepstow Park Wood, located immediately south of the village towards Itton, is an extensive area of mixed woodland owned and managed by the Forestry Commission, and popular with walkers. It was established as a hunting forest and deer park in around 1280 by Roger Bigod, 5th Earl of Norfolk, the lord of Striguil or Chepstow Castle. It covers about 3,300 hectares, and was originally enclosed by a fence stretching 7.8 km. Around 1340, it was occupied and taken over by a band of outlaws led by William de Derneford and his son Robert. It was re-enclosed with a stone wall around 1630, and at the same time a stone lodge was built in the centre of the forest, with views back towards Chepstow, for the use of visitors to the forest. Later, the wood became notorious as a haunt of highwaymen. Historically, the woodland lay within the parish of Newchurch East. Chepstow Park is listed at Grade II on the Cadw/ICOMOS Register of Parks and Gardens of Special Historic Interest in Wales.

== Amenities ==
The Hood Memorial Hall was opened in 1953, funded by a local resident, Mrs. Hood, on land donated by Lady Curre. The pub, the Mason's Arms, dates from around 1800. Following the death of the landlord in 2012 it has remained closed. It was sold to a new owner in 2025 and is in the process of being refurbished before it is reopened.

The village is located within the Wye Valley AONB. The garden at Veddw House is a popular visitor attraction.
