= Flag of Monmouthshire =

Historic Welsh county flag

Monmouthshire
- Proportion: 3:5
- Adopted: 30 September 2011
- Design: Per pale Azure and Sable three fleurs-de-lys Or
- Designed by: The Monmouthshire Association

The Monmouthshire flag (Welsh: Baner Sir Fynwy) is the flag of the historic county of Monmouth. It was registered with the Flag Institute as the official flag of the county in 2011 although its origins date back to the 6th century due to its use by the Kingdom of Gwent.

== History ==
Coat of arms of the Monmouthshire County Council

The arms are those attributed by medieval heralds to King Inyr of the Welsh Kingdom of Gwent (Old Welsh: Guent), from which Monmouthshire, once known in Old English as Wentset and Wentsland, descends. The County Council of Monmouth were first granted the arms in 1948 and they have been incorporated into the arms of other bodies over the succeeding years. This is a pattern long associated with Monmouthshire and it is also used today in the shield of the Diocese of Monmouth and in those of Monmouthshire Council, Blaenau Gwent Council and the Monmouthshire County RFC.

In 2010, Jason Saber, a member of the Association of British Counties proposed the design as an official flag for Monmouthshire, due to the flag's long association with the county including being the shield of the council arms. The design was altered from the ancient design to adhere better to the rule of tincture, which states that darker colours should not be adjacent in heraldry, so the shade of blue was lightened.

In December, the Monmouthshire Association was founded and began to promote the flag to be officially adopted by the county. It manufactured and lent several flags to local organisations, including the Monmouthshire Mounted Games Team, who used it in light of other participating counties already having official flags.

The next year, Devauden village hall became the first organisation to permanently fly the flag. Following this, the Monmouthshire council were contacted and expressed their approval of the flag on September 29th, 2011. It was registered by the Flag Institute the same year.

== Design ==
The flag is a bicolour of azure and sable (blue and black) with three fluers-de-lys of yellow.

=== Colours ===
The pantone colours for the flag are:

| Scheme | Blue | Yellow | Black |
|---|---|---|---|
| Pantone (paper) | 300 C | 108 C | Black |
| HEX | #005eb8 | #fedb00 | #000000 |
| CMYK | 0, 81, 87, 15 | 0, 14, 100, 0 | 0, 0, 0, 100 |
| RGB | 217, 41, 28 | 254, 219, 0 | 0, 0, 0 |

== Armorial banner ==
Flag used by Monmouthshire Council

Monmouthshire Council, which administers the principal area of Monmouthshire in the eastern part of the traditional county, uses a white banner charged with its coat of arms.

== Gallery ==
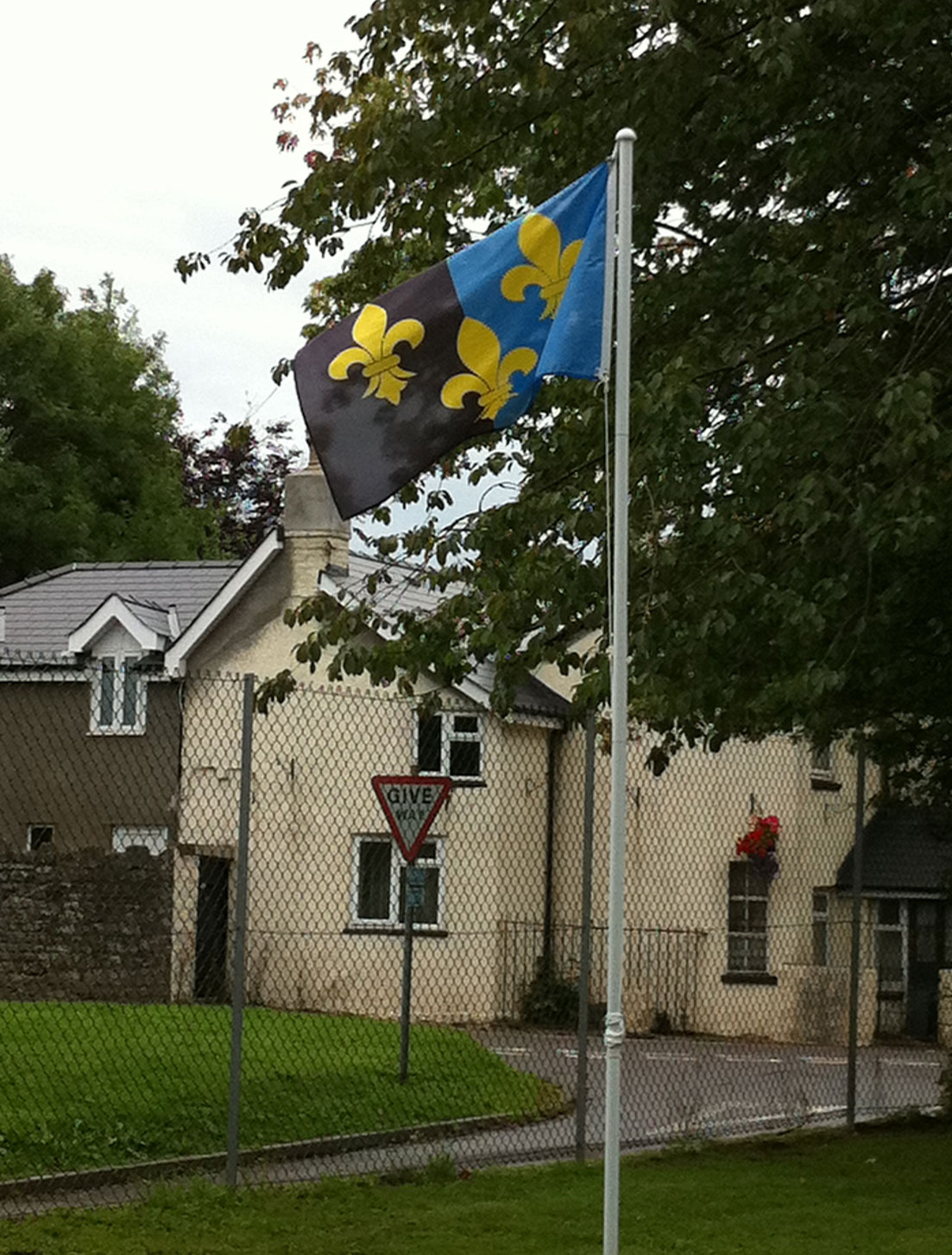
The Monmouthshire flag flying at the Hood Memorial Hall, Devauden in 2011.

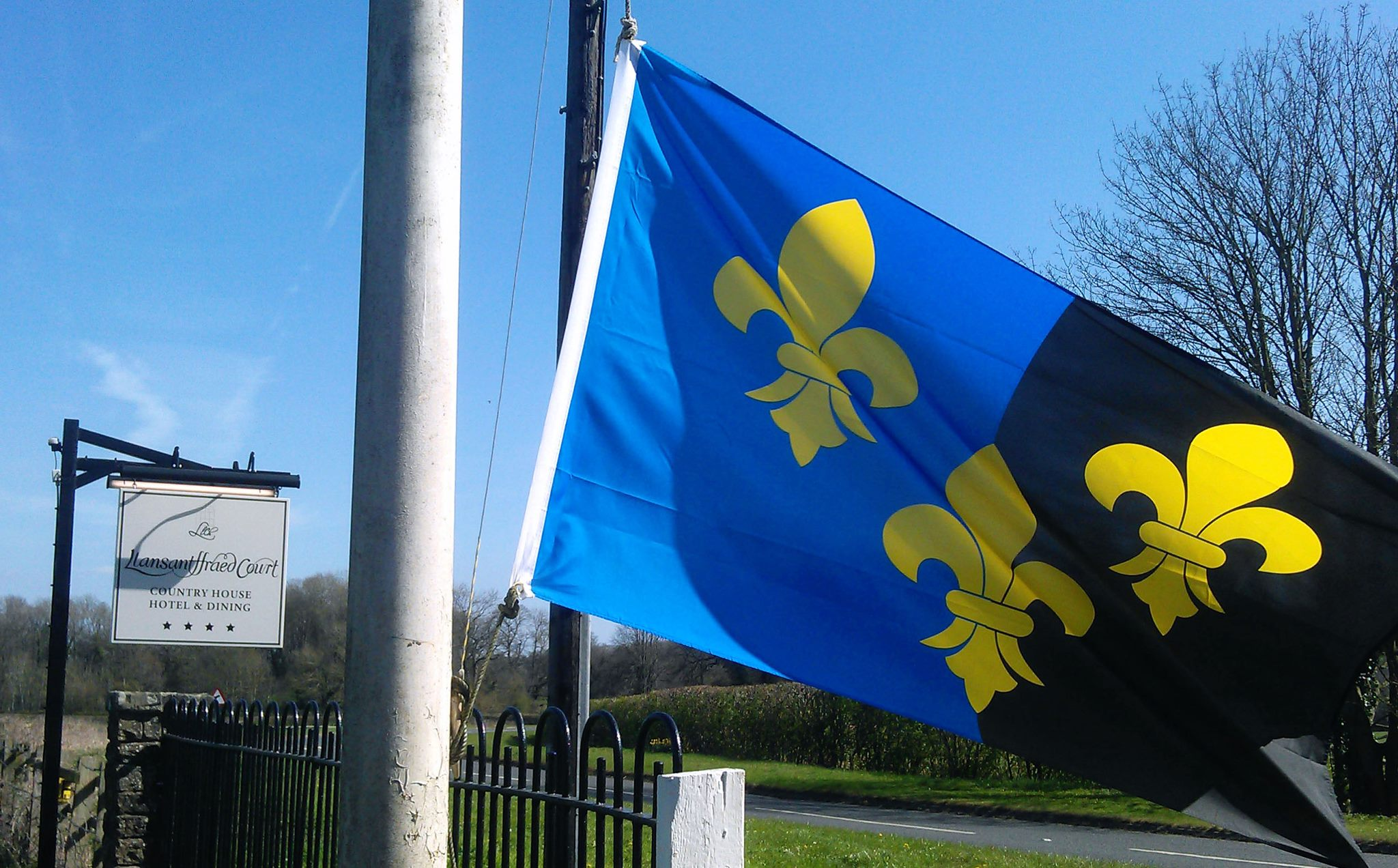
The Monmouthshire flag flying at the Llansantffraed Court Hotel, Clytha in 2012.

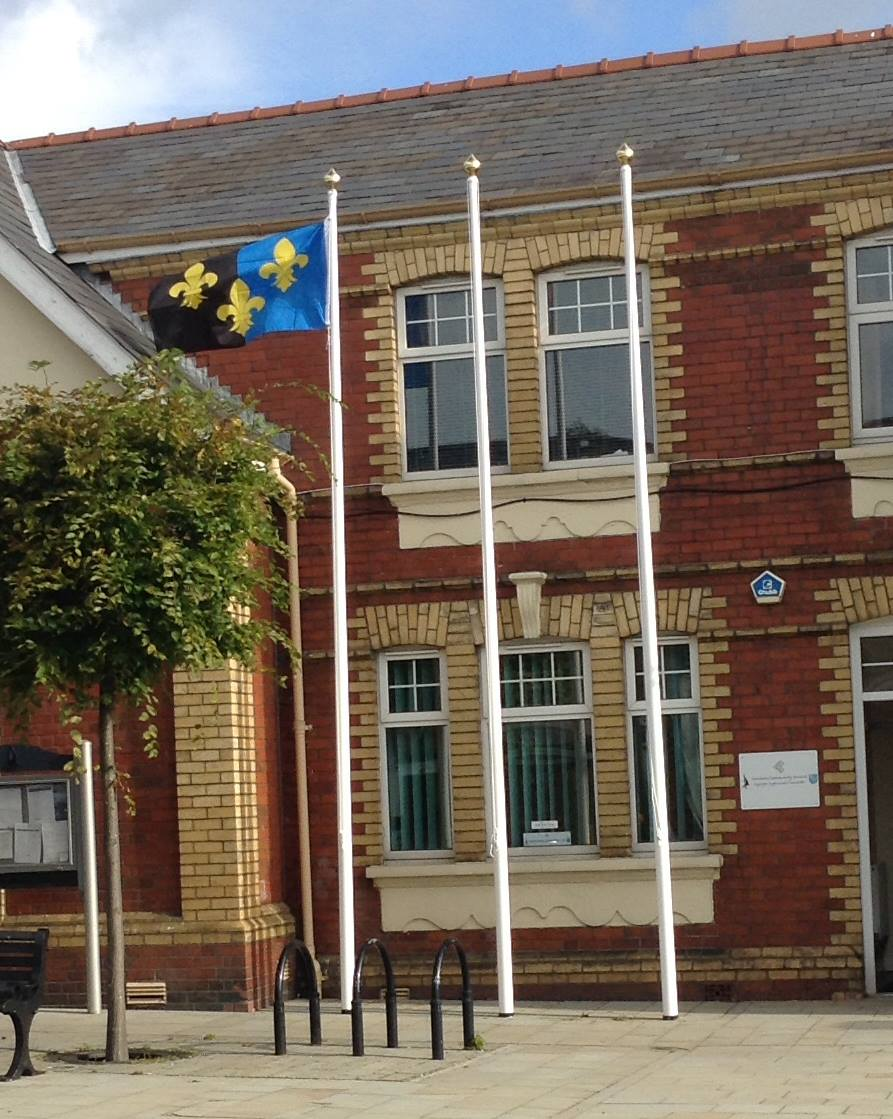
The Monmouthshire flag flying at Cwmbran Community Council offices on Monmouthshire Day, 25 September 2014.
