= Florence Camm =

British stained-glass artist, painter and metalworker

- Born: 7 August 1874; Smethwick, Staffordshire
- Died: 1960 (aged 85–86)
- Known for: Stained Glass
- Notable work: Dante's La Vita Nuova windows
- Movement: Arts and Crafts movement
- Awards: Grand Prix at the Turon International Exhibition (1911)

Florence Camm (7 August 1874 – 1960) was a British stained-glass artist, painter and metalworker associated with the Arts and Crafts movement. Camm and her brothers, Walter and Robert, took over the management of the family stained-glass business after her father, T. W. Camm died in 1912. Camm was the principal designer of the firm until her death in 1960.

== Early life and education ==
Florence was born 7 August 1874, in Smethwick, Staffordshire (now Birmingham). She was one of nine children of Thomas William Camm (1839–1912) and Charlotte Middleton (1840–1909). Her father was a stained glass artist who worked for glass manufacturer, Chance Brothers and Company in Smethwick. He set up his own stained glass studio-workshop, T.W. Camm & Co., in 1867 after Chance Brothers closed its Coloured & Ornamental Department.

Camm attended the King Edward VI Camp Hill School for Girls and later took classes at the Birmingham Municipal School of Art, between 1892 and 1912. She learned the technique of stained glass making from prominent stained glass artist, Henry Payne. Camm won numerous prizes for her drawings, stained glass designs and metalwork. She exhibited her work in national and international exhibitions.

In 1911, Camm created what is considered her most successful work, three stained glass windows for the English House at the Turin International Exhibition. Illustrating scenes from Dante's La Vita Nuova, Camm's windows won the exhibition's Grand Prix in three classes and the Diploma of Honour for the exhibition. The windows are now in the permanent collection of the Birmingham Museum of Art, Alabama. Camm began working for her father's firm when she was taking classes at the Birmingham Art School. In 1897, the studio-workshop was producing stained glass, mosaics, tapestry and fresco paintings.

== Career ==
When Camm's father, Thomas died in 1912, Camm and two of her brothers, Robert (1878–1954) and Walter (1881–1967) continued the family business under the name T. W. Camm. Camm was the principal designer of the firm, and her brothers Robert (1878–1954) and Walter (1881–1967) managed the company. Camm and Walter designed and created most of the firm's commissions in the Smethwick studio. Camm also produced most of the artwork for the company after 1912. The studio-workshop transitioned from creating late Victorian designs into more contemporary designs along with the use of colours and materials characteristic of the Arts and Crafts movement. The firm achieved international recognition for their work.

The studio obtained commissions from influential architects and designers working in the style of the Arts and Crafts movement. The firm created stained glass, art and metalwork for residences, commercial buildings and parish churches in the United Kingdom, India, Spain, South Africa and the United States. Camm became a fellow of the British Society of Master Glass Painters in 1930. She taught art classes at the Smethwick Technical College for 24 years. At the age of 80, Camm was still painting and designing stained-glass windows in the Camm studio.

Camm died of pneumonia at Selly Oak Hospital on 27 October 1960. The firm closed in the late 1960s after the death of her brother Walter in 1967. The studio in the High Street in Smethwick was demolished in the 1980s and a shop now stands on the site.

A number of Camm's windows are now in museums, including several in Birmingham Museum and Art Gallery. In one of these, The Story of Dante and Beatrice, the historian Elaine Williams identified a self-portrait, seen as a partially-hidden figure.
