= William Curre =

British landowner and magistrate

Colonel Sir William Edward Carne Curre, 1st Baronet, CBE, JP, DL (26 June 1855 – 26 January 1930) was a British landowner and magistrate.

Curre was the son of Edward Mathew Curre, of Itton Court, a Justice of the Peace and Deputy Lieutenant for Monmouthshire, by Annie King, of Chepstow. He was a Lieutenant-Colonel and Honorary Colonel of the Royal Monmouthshire Engineers Militia and served as High Sheriff of Monmouthshire between 1892 and 1893. In 1920 he was appointed a Commander of the Order of the British Empire (CBE). He was created a baronet, of Itton Court in the Parish of Itton and County of Monmouth in 1928. Curre died in January 1930, aged 74, when the title became extinct.

Honorary titles
Preceded by Thomas Firbank	High Sheriff of Monmouthshire; 1892–1893	Succeeded by Arthur Evans
Baronetage of the United Kingdom
New creation	Baronet (of Itton Court); 1928–1930	Extinct
