= Warley College =

Former educational institution in England

Warley College, originally called Warley College of Technology, was a college of further and higher education which served the vicinity of Oldbury in the West Midlands of England. It was formed in 1968 by the amalgamation of Oldbury College of Further Education and Chance Technical College in Smethwick and named in accordance with the recently created County Borough of Warley. It was located on the main Wolverhampton – Birmingham road.

Warley College ceased to exist after July 1986, when it merged with West Bromwich College to form Sandwell College – named in accordance with the new metropolitan borough which had been formed 12 years earlier in a merger between the county boroughs of West Bromwich and Warley.
