= Chance Technical College =

Technical college in Staffordshire, England

Chance Technical College was a technical college located in the County Borough of Smethwick in Staffordshire, England.

The Chance family started evening classes in science and art at their glassworks in Spon Lane in 1846 and in 1852 formed an education institute there which existed for almost twenty years. Other classes followed and in 1885 the borough council formed a school board to run them. Most classes were run at the higher grade school in Crocketts Lane. In 1910 a permanent Smethwick Technical School was opened next door. It served as a Junior Technical School for school-age pupils during the day and an adult further education school in the evenings. In 1927 it was renamed Smethwick Municipal College and in 1945 it became Chance Technical College. The junior technical school moved into its own building and was renamed James Watt Technical School.

In 1968, Chance Technical College amalgamated with Oldbury College of Further Education to form Warley College of Technology.
