= T. W. Camm =

English stained glass designer and manufacturer

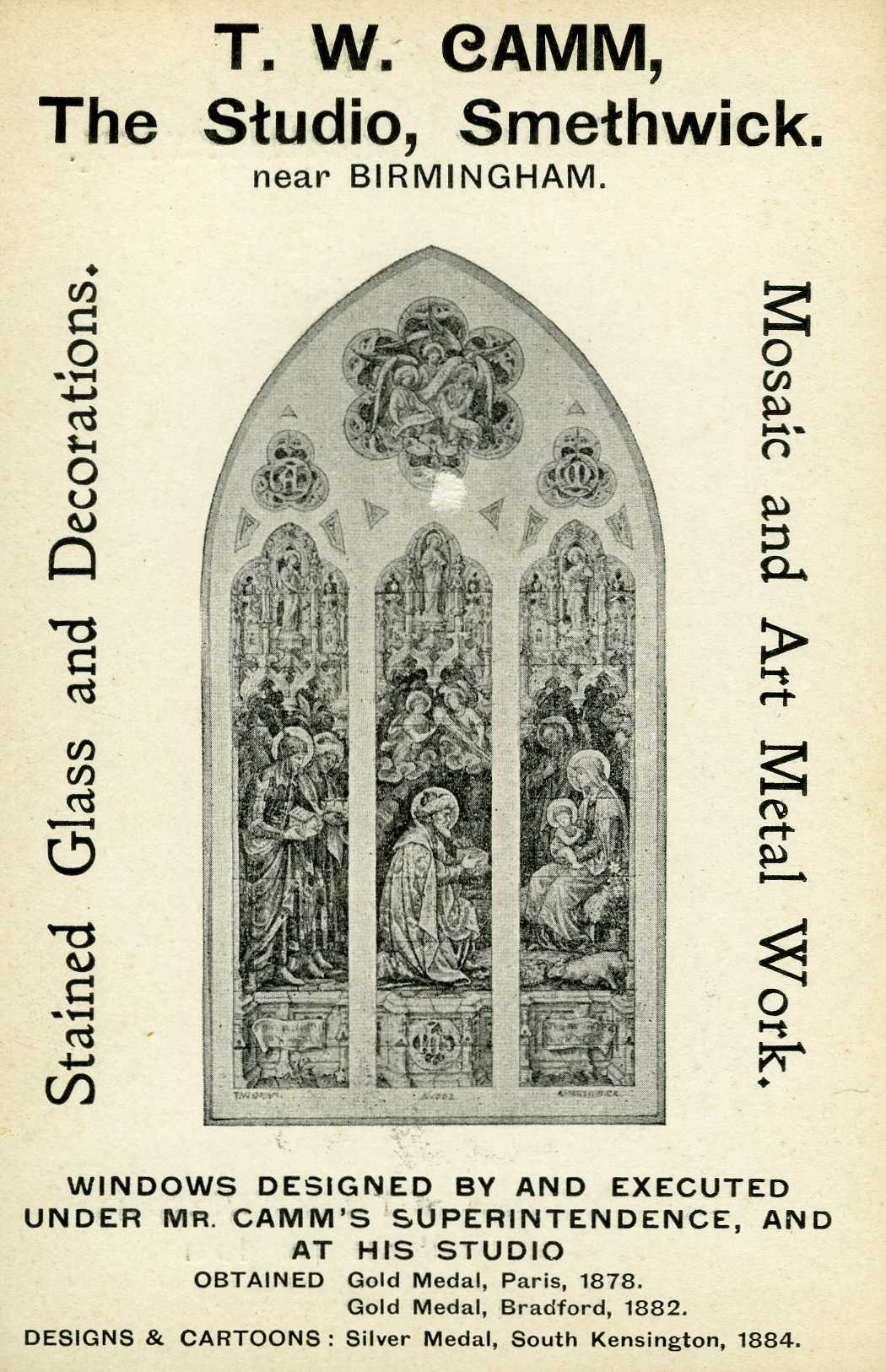
Advertisement for T.W. Camm

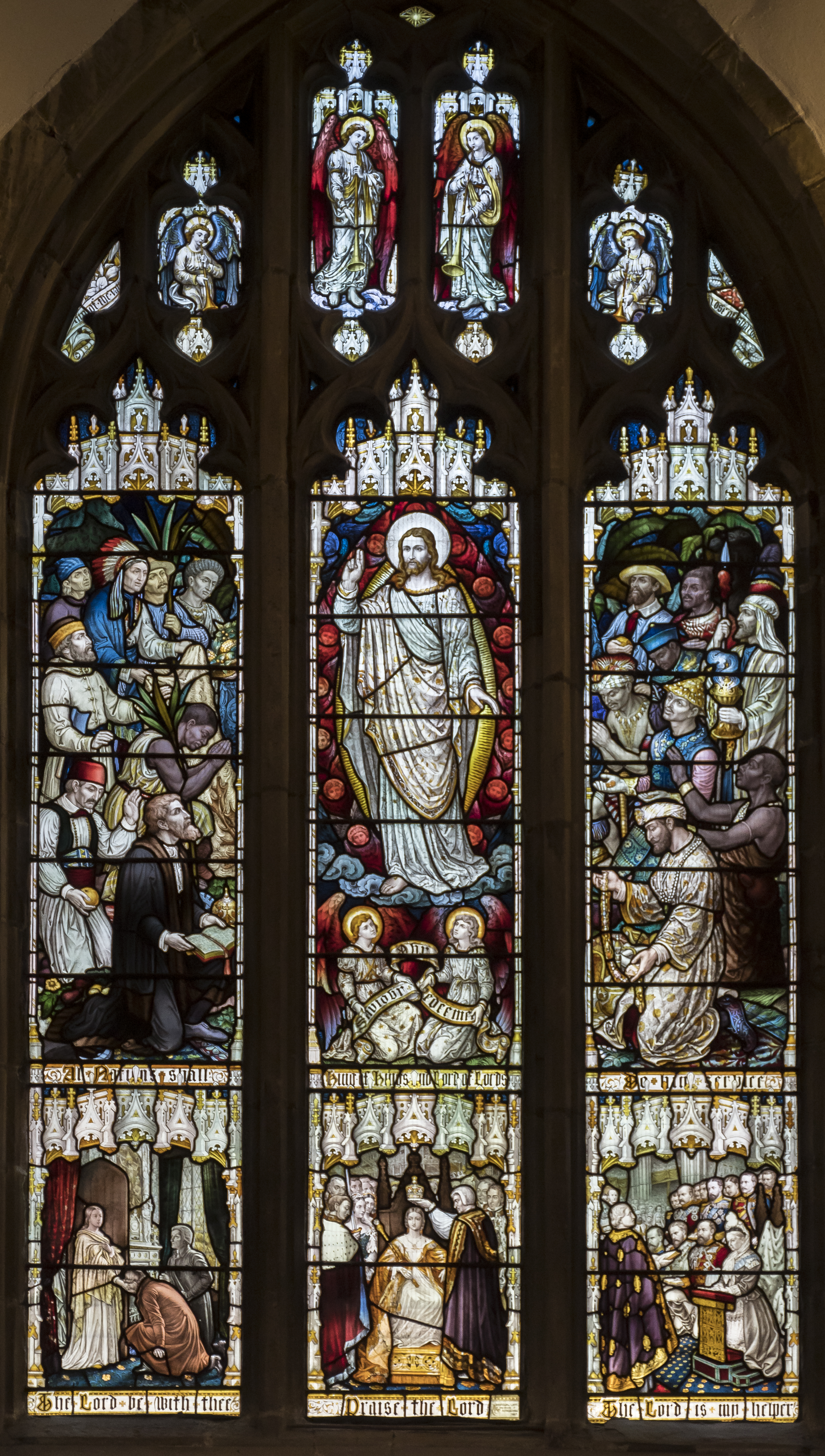
Great Malvern Priory window, commemorating Queen Victoria's Golden Jubilee, designed by Camm and made under the auspices of R. W. Winfield & Co

Thomas William Camm (1839 – 1912) was an English stained glass designer and manufacturer.

Born in Spon Lane, West Bromwich, he worked for the ornamental department of Chance Brothers in Smethwick until it closed down in 1867, when he set up his own company of Camm Brothers. This was bought by the Birmingham firm of R. W. Winfield in 1882, but by 1888 Camm was again working independently as T. W. Camm.

Camm's work was widely acclaimed. His studio won medals in Paris in 1878, in Sydney in 1879 and in Turin in 1911, and the American architect Ralph Adams Cram wrote:

at the present moment a large number of artists in England are producing work of most singular beauty and perfection. Amongst these I have no hesitation in placing Mr. Camm easily as the first.

His daughter Florence Camm produced most of the artwork for the company after his death in 1912.

Other artist-makers who worked for the company included Florence Evelyn Loach and her husband Albert Fell. They both also acted as models for Florence Camm's work, including the 'Dante and Beatrice' windows, which are now in Birmingham Museum and Art Gallery.
