= Tredean House, Devauden =

Tredean House
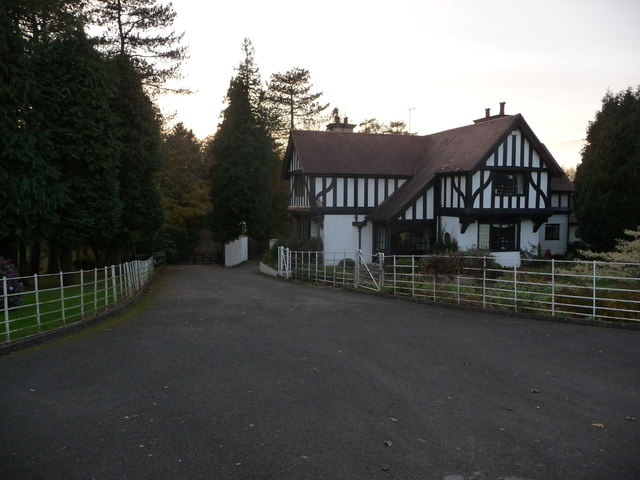
- "A pert half-timbered lodge" - the only element of Tredean visible from the road

- Location within Monmouthshire
- 51.6896°N 2.7571°W
- Type: House
- Location: Devauden, Monmouthshire

History
- Built: 1901-02

Site notes
- Architect: Arthur Jessop Hardwick
- Architectural style: Arts and Crafts
- Governing body: Privately owned

Listed Building – Grade II*
- Official name: Tredean
- Designated: 8 September 2000
- Reference no.: 23978

Listed Building – Grade II
- Official name: Teahouse/Gazebo, steps and terracing at Tredean
- Designated: 8 September 2000
- Reference no.: 23979

Listed Building – Grade II
- Official name: Stable block and Garage at Tredean
- Designated: 8 September 2000
- Reference no.: 23980

Listed Building – Grade II
- Official name: Lodge at entrance to Tredean
- Designated: 8 September 2000
- Reference no.: 23981

Tredean House, Devauden, Monmouthshire is a country house dating from 1901 to 1902. It was designed in an Arts and Crafts style by the architect Arthur Jessop Hardwick. The client was a Henry Simpson. The house, a Grade II* listed building, remains a private residence and is not visible from the public highway, although the gatehouse can be seen.

== History ==
In the early 20th century the Dukes of Beaufort sold off their extensive Monmouthshire estates, centred on Troy House. The site of Tredean was purchased by a Mr Henry Simpson, who began the construction of a large house in the Arts and Crafts style. His architect was Arthur Hardwick and the house was completed between 1901 and 1902. Tredean remains a private house which was marketed for £2.25m in 2002. In 2022 the house, renamed Devauden Manor, was again for sale, with a guide price of £3.5M. The house cannot be seen from the road, although the lodge, also in private ownership and with its own Grade II listing, and which the architectural historian John Newman considered "pert", gives a flavour of the house's style.

== Architecture and description ==
John Newman describes Tredean as "a large and ambitious house in a loose Voyseyesque style". Cadw records its terraced setting, on the side of a steep hill, "two-storey and-attic with a full basement due to the artificial ground level". It describes the interior as "more Norman Shaw 'olde English' than Voysey" and notes the "very high standard" of the house's restoration in the very late 20th century. The house is Grade II* listed, with the lodge, the stable block and garage, and the teahouse in the garden, all having their own Grade II listings. Coflein records that the house is "almost unaltered" since its construction. The rooms in the house include a panelled entrance hall with stained glass, a dining room and sitting room with some reproduction fittings in the original style, a billiard room and a bathroom of 1902 with its "tiling and sanitary ware all complete".

The terraced gardens surrounding the house were developed later, c.1910, but follow the Arts and Crafts style.
