= Wentwood =

Coordinates: 51.631899°N 2.827669°W

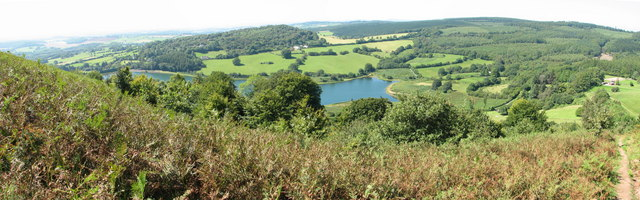
- Wentwood reservoir and hills seen from Gray Hill

Highest point
- Elevation: 309 m (1,014 ft)
- Prominence: 243 m (797 ft)
- Listing: Marilyn, council top (Newport)

Geography
- Location: Newport / Monmouthshire, Wales, United Kingdom
- OS grid: ST411942

Wentwood (Welsh: Coed Gwent), in Monmouthshire, South Wales, is a forested area of hills, rising to 1,014 feet (309 m) above sea level. It is located to the northeast of, and partly within the boundaries of, the city of Newport.

== Geology ==
Wentwood is underlain by sandstones which are assigned to the Brownstones Formation of the Old Red Sandstone, a suite of sedimentary rocks laid down during the Devonian period. The beds dip gently to moderately in a south-easterly direction. It is the southernmost part of a range of hills formed by the relatively hard-wearing Brownstones sandstones which stretch in a rough arc northwards through eastern Monmouthshire, the broadly west-facing scarps of which are generally well wooded.

== Wentwood hamlet ==
There is a small number of houses in Wentwood, known as Wentwood hamlet. Gilgal Chapel is a restored church in Wentwood.

Wentwood Village: Welsh: Pentref Coed Gwent
- Location within Newport
- Principal area: Newport
- Country: Wales
- Sovereign state: United Kingdom
- Post town: NEWPORT
- Postcode district: NP26 3
- Dialling code: 01633; Llanwern and Penhow exchanges
- Police: Gwent
- Fire: South Wales
- Ambulance: Welsh
- UK Parliament: Newport East

== Ancient woodland ==
It is the largest ancient woodland in Wales and the ninth largest in the UK. The current wooded area is a remnant of a much larger ancient forest which once extended between the rivers Usk and Wye and which divided the old kingdom of Gwent into two – Gwent Uwchcoed and Iscoed, that is, above and below the wood.

== Prehistory ==
The area contains Bronze Age burial mounds, a stone circle, and a megalithic alignment on Gray Hill, Monmouthshire.

== Middle Ages ==
In the Middle Ages, the woods belonged to the lordship of Chepstow and provided hunting preserves, and timber, fuel and pasturage for the tenants of nearby manors. The Royal Forest of Wentwood had its own forest laws and courts were held twice yearly at Forester's Oaks, above Wentwood Reservoir.

These courts tried luckless locals charged with a range of crimes within the forest boundaries, from sheep stealing to poaching deer. These crimes were taken so seriously that culprits were hanged from one of the two Forester's Oaks. The last offender dealt with in this severe way was hanged as recently as 1829.

== Later history ==
The edges of the wood were gradually cleared and felled away in the 16th century and 17th century by farmers. In 1678 Wentwood was the scene of riots led by Nathan Rogers and Edward Kemys against the actions of Henry Somerset, 1st Duke of Beaufort who, as Lord Lieutenant of Monmouthshire and Governor of Chepstow Castle, enclosed some 3,000 acres (1,200 ha) of the forest for his own use, and began to fell trees for use in his ironworks at Tintern. The tenants of the area, including Rogers, claimed that the ancient rights to the forest belonged to them, and rioted when 50 of Somerset's armed men arrived to carry away the felled wood.

Many stands of substantial mature Welsh Oaks were felled to meet the demand for stout oak heartwoods in Royal Navy battleships and men o' war of the Napoleonic era of the 19th century, such as HMS Victory and others, but the heart of the forest remained preserved for charcoal production, a necessity for the iron industry and local ironworks. Henry Somerset sold 2,244 trees in Wentwood Forest, described as "the largest wood in England", in May 1902.

The first conifer plantations were planted at Wentwood in 1880, and most of the native trees were felled during World War I to provide timber for props and supports for the trenches. When the area was replanted by the Forestry Commission in the 1950s and 1960s, the original broadleaved deciduous trees were largely replaced with non-native conifers, damaging the woodland habitat. More recently, broadleaved trees have been allowed to grow back.

== Recreation area ==
Wentwood and its surrounding areas are popular with hillwalking and mountain biking enthusiasts and the Wentwood Reservoir, opened in 1904, was a centre for trout fishing prior to being drained in 2019 for refurbishment works by utility company Dŵyr Cymru (Welsh Water). The reservoir is slowly being refilled by natural water capture, which is expected to take around 12 months. The area is also home to thousands of wildlife species. These include 75 species of bird, including turtle doves, nightjars and spotted flycatchers; dormice; Eurasian otters; pipistrelle bats; and ancient woodland plants, such as wild daffodil, wood sorrel, and yellow pimpernel.

In 2006, the Woodland Trust completed the purchase of some 352 hectares (nearly 900 acres) of Wentwood after a high-profile campaign, and plans a programme of conservation and restoration.

In April 2007, an illegal rave event took place in Wentwood, with around 3,000 people before it was broken up.

Vehicle access to much of the site is restricted, to protect the ancient monuments. Despite this, off-road vehicles have regularly caused problems, culminating in damage to one of the prehistoric burial mounds over the Christmas holidays of 2019.
