= Striguil =

Coordinates: 51.638°N 2.678°W

Striguil or Strigoil is the name that was used from the 11th century until the late 14th century for the port and Norman castle of Chepstow, on the Welsh side of the River Wye which forms the boundary with England. The name was also applied to the Marcher Lordship of Striguil which controlled the area in the period between the Norman Conquest and the formation of Monmouthshire under the Laws in Wales Acts 1535–1542.

== Origins of the name ==
The name – which was spelled in various alternative forms, including Estrighoiel and Strigoiel in the Domesday Book of 1086 – probably derives from the Welsh word ystreigyl meaning 'a bend in the river'. An alternative suggestion is that it derives from Welsh words ystre, meaning boundary or dyke, and gwyl, meaning watch or guard; a combined word *ystregwyl could mean "well-guarded border (or dyke)", perhaps referring to the location's proximity to the southern end of Offa's Dyke.

In the medieval period the town which grew up between the port, the castle, and the priory church became known as Chepstow, from the old English or Saxon ceap / chepe stowe meaning market place. The castle and lordship retained the name Striguil until about the 14th century, when they adopted the English name of the town. The lordship was also known, in some medieval documents, as Netherwent, that is the lower (southern) part of the former Welsh Kingdom of Gwent.

== The Lordship of Striguil ==
The Marcher Lordship of Striguil was established by William fitz Osbern, who started the building of the castle at Chepstow. On his death in 1071, the lordship passed to his son, Roger de Breteuil, but he plotted against King William, was captured and imprisoned, and had his estates forfeited. The lordship then reverted to the English crown until about 1115, when it was granted to Walter fitz Richard de Clare, the son of Richard fitz Gilbert. It remained with the De Clare family, including Richard de Clare known as "Strongbow", before passing to William Marshal on his marriage to Richard's daughter Isabel in 1189. It then passed in turn to Marshal's sons, the last of whom, Anselm, died without issue in 1245. The Lordship of Striguil was then divided into several parts, with Chepstow and Netherwent being allotted to Marshal's grandson, Roger Bigod, 5th Earl of Norfolk, and the castles at Trellech and Usk, and their surrounding areas, forming new lordships under other members of the family. The area of the lordship extended east of the River Wye to take in the manors of Tidenham, Woolaston, Beachley and Lancaut, which became part of Gloucestershire in 1535 under the Laws in Wales Act.

== Cas Troggy ==
As a result of confusion over references in William Camden's Britannia, some early maps, such as those by Morden, wrongly used the name Striguil, or similar names such as Strogli, to refer to the small castle known as Cas Troggy in the parish of Newchurch. This was built by Roger Bigod, Earl of Norfolk around 1303, but it was abandoned a few years later. It is located on the northern slopes of Wentwood some 7.5 miles (12 km) west of Chepstow at Pen y cae-mawr, beside the old road between Chepstow and Usk.
