= Grade II* listed buildings in Monmouthshire =

List of buildings in principal area of Wales

Monmouthshire shown within Wales

Monmouthshire is a county of Wales. It borders Torfaen and Newport to the west; Herefordshire and Gloucestershire to the east; and Powys to the north. The largest town is Abergavenny, with the other major towns being Chepstow, Monmouth, and Usk. The county is 850 km^{2} (330 sq mi) in extent, with a population of 95,200 as of 2020. The present county was formed under the Local Government (Wales) Act 1994, which came into effect in 1996, and comprises some sixty percent of the historic county. Between 1974 and 1996, the county was known by the ancient title of Gwent, recalling the medieval Welsh kingdom. In his essay on local government in the fifth and final volume of the Gwent County History, Robert McCloy suggests that the governance of "no county in the United Kingdom in the twentieth century was so transformed as that of Monmouthshire".

In the United Kingdom the term "listed building" refers to a building or structure officially designated as of special architectural, historical or cultural significance. Listing was begun by a provision in the Town and Country Planning Act 1947. Once a building is listed, strict limitations are imposed on allowable modifications to its structure or fittings. In Wales, the authority for listing under the Planning (Listed Buildings and Conservation Areas) Act 1990 rests with Cadw. Listed buildings are categorised into three grades:

- Grade I – buildings of exceptional interest, only 2.5% of listed buildings in England and Wales are Grade I;
- Grade II* – buildings of particular importance with more than special interest, 5.8% of listed buildings in England and Wales are Grade II*;
- Grade II – buildings of special interest; 91.7% of all listed buildings in England and Wales are in this class.

There are 244 Grade II* listed buildings in Monmouthshire. (Note: There are 53 Grade I listed buildings in the county and 2128 listed at Grade II.) They include seventy-two houses, forty-two churches, thirty-five farmhouses, twenty-one commercial premises, eight bridges, seven barns, six garden structures, four sets of walls, railings or gates, three gatehouses, two chapels, two community centres, two dovecotes, an almshouse, an aqueduct, a castle, a courthouse, a cross, a dairy, a folly, a masonic lodge, a mill, a prison, a former slaughterhouse, a statue and a theatre. (Note: There is not an exact match between the number of Grade II* listed buildings in Monmouthshire (244) and the number of Wikipedia entries for these (217). There are a number of reasons for this: some Wikipedia entries cover more than one listing, e.g. Castle Terrace, Chepstow covers fifteen listings, Listing 2520 and Listings 27134 to 27147 inclusive; and some single buildings or structures have more than one listing, e.g. New Bridge, Newbridge-on-Usk which, quite commonly for bridges, has listings for both ends.)

The architecture of the county was first systematically covered by William Coxe in his two-volume journal, An Historical Tour in Monmouthshire, published in 1801. (Note: An earlier history was published in 1796 by David Williams, a Welsh minister.) A detailed county history was undertaken by Sir Joseph Bradney, in his A History of Monmouthshire from the Coming of the Normans into Wales down to the Present Time, published in the early 20th century. More recent studies include those of the architectural historian John Newman, in his Gwent/Monmouthshire volume of the Pevsner Buildings of Wales series published in 2000; the coverage of Monmouthshire houses in Peter Smith's Houses of the Welsh Countryside, published in 1975 and, most exhaustively, by Sir Cyril Fox and Lord Raglan, in their three-volume study, Monmouthshire Houses, published between 1951 and 1954. The last was described by Smith as "one of the most remarkable studies of vernacular architecture yet made in the British Isles" and "a landmark, in its own field, as significant as Darwin's Origin of Species".

== Noteworthy buildings and people ==
Monmouthshire's only Grade II* listed castle, Skenfrith, forms the eastern point of the Three Castles triangle, a grouping that remained in unified ownership from the reign of King Stephen until the 20th century. William Coxe, in his 1801 history, described it as "the oldest castle in Monmouthshire". Architects of national importance who worked in the county include John Nash and Sir John Soane, who made their respective marks at the Clytha Park gates and the, now ruinous, Piercefield House. Sir Aston Webb, who designed the present frontage of Buckingham Palace, built on a less imposing scale at the Swiss Cottage, Rockfield. The involvement of such national figures was rare; the county's major houses are predominantly modest dwellings built by the Welsh gentry, such as Lower Dyffryn House, Grosmont, constructed by a cadet branch of the Cecil family. Llanarth Court, constructed for John Jones, a member of the Monmouthshire squirearchy, and described by John Newman as a "neo-classical monster", is unusual both in its scale and its style. Nos. 1–6 Priory Street in Monmouth, which begin what Newman called "a remarkably early inner bypass", are by George Vaughan Maddox, whose work contributed much to the architectural flavour of the county town. The county's churches are predominantly medieval, such as the Church of St Cybi at Llangybi. Exceptions include the Church of St Mary and St Michael, Llanarth, the first Catholic chapel built in Monmouthshire since the Dissolution of the Monasteries, and St Mary's Priory Church, Monmouth, by the Victorian architect, George Edmund Street.

Notable people connected with Monmouthshire's Grade II* listed buildings include the Catholic martyr David Lewis who was imprisoned at 30 Bridge Street, Usk prior to his execution in 1679; Lord Nelson, whose tour down what he called that "little gut of a river, the Wye", is commemorated in a pavilion in the Nelson Garden in Monmouth; the aviation and motoring pioneer, Charles Stewart Rolls, the first Briton to die in a plane crash, who lived at The Hendre, Monmouthshire's major Victorian country house, and whose statue stands in Agincourt Square; and Winston Churchill, whose predecessors lived at Trewyn House in the north of the county. For over two hundred years, the Dukes of Beaufort directed the management of their extensive Monmouthshire estates, and the political life of the county, from their seat at Troy House. FitzRoy Somerset, 1st Baron Raglan, received Cefntilla Court in recognition of his services as the British commander during the Crimean War; and the writer and gardener, Henry Avray Tipping built two houses for himself, at Mounton and at High Glanau. John Loraine Baldwin, a founder of the cricket club I Zingari and author of the rules of both badminton and whist, lived at St Anne's House, Tintern. The Victorian poet Cecil Frances Alexander was reputed to have been inspired to write the hymn All Things Bright and Beautiful by the countryside around Llanwenarth House.

== Buildings ==
Name	Location	Date Listed	Grid Ref. (Note: Sometimes known as OSGB36, the grid reference is based on the British national grid reference system used by the Ordnance Survey.) Geo-coordinates	Function	Notes	Reference Number	Image
Upper Dyffryn House	Grosmont	5 June 1952	SO4218223413; 51°54′23″N 2°50′31″W	House	On the road to Norton, 2 km (1.2 mi) south-east of Grosmont. The detached kitchen and dairy building has a separate Grade II* listing. Additional reference number:	1922	Upper Dyffryn House
Old Court	Llangattock Lingoed	5 June 1952	SO3616719492; 51°52′13″N 2°55′43″W	House	1 km (0.62 mi) south of Llangattock Lingoed on the road to Llanvetherine	1923	Old Court
Great Pool Hall	Llanvetherine	5 June 1952	SO3713618970; 51°51′57″N 2°54′52″W	House	2 km (1.2 mi) north-east of Llanvetherine	1924	Great Pool Hall
Llanarth Court	Llanarth	5 June 1952	SO3806110470; 51°47′22″N 2°53′58″W	House	South-east of Llanarth	1925	Llanarth Court
Wern-ddu Farmhouse	Llantilio Pertholey	5 June 1952	SO3207715270; 51°49′55″N 2°59′14″W	Farmhouse	On the road to Skenfrith 500 m (1,600 ft) east of Maindiff Court Hospital	1927	Wern-ddu Farmhouse
Court Farmhouse	Llanover	5 June 1952	SO3543713100; 51°48′46″N 2°56′17″W	Farmhouse	1 km (0.62 mi) north of Llanover village on the road to the church	1928	Court Farmhouse
Trewyn House	Llanvihangel Crucorney	1 September 1956	SO3287222846; 51°54′00″N 2°58′37″W	House	Manor house dating from 1692, 2 km (1.2 mi) north of the village of Llanvihangel Crucorney	1931	Trewyn House
Trewyn House Dovecote	Llanvihangel Crucorney	1 September 1956	SO3290622919; 51°54′03″N 2°58′36″W	Dovecote	50 m (160 ft) north of Trewyn House	1932	Trewyn House Dovecote
Little Llwygy Farmhouse	Cwmyoy	1 September 1956	SO3172322091; 51°53′35″N 2°59′37″W	Farmhouse	At the south end of Lower Cwmyoy	1936	Little Llwygy Farmhouse
Llanvihangel Court Garden House	Llanvihangel Crucorney	1 September 1956	SO3288820384; 51°52′41″N 2°58′35″W	Garden structure	In the grounds of Llanvihangel Court	1945	Llanvihangel Court Garden House
Lower Duffryn House	Grosmont	1 September 1956	SO4351822730; 51°54′01″N 2°49′20″W	House	3 km (1.9 mi) southwest of Grosmont, off the road to Norton	1950	Lower Duffryn House
Glyndŵr House	Grosmont	1 September 1956	SO4041024416; 51°54′54″N 2°52′04″W	House	In the centre of Grosmont, 50 m (160 ft) north-west of the town hall	1952	Glyndŵr House
Town Farm	Grosmont	1 September 1956	SO4042824338; 51°54′52″N 2°52′03″W	Farmhouse	50 m (160 ft) north-west of the church in the centre of Grosmont	1953	Town Farm
Lower Tresenny Barn	Grosmont	1 September 1956	SO4085424071; 51°54′43″N 2°51′41″W	Barn	400 m (1,300 ft) south-east of Grosmont	1954	Lower Tresenny Barn
Church of St James	Llangua	1 September 1956	SO3896725743; 51°55′37″N 2°53′20″W	Church	15th-century church 1 km (0.62 mi) south-west of Llangua Bridge	1958	Church of St James
Lower Celliau	Llangattock Lingoed	1 September 1956	SO3720921018; 51°53′03″N 2°54′49″W	House	Early 16th-century cruck-framed hall house 1 km (0.62 mi) north-east of Llangattock Lingoed	1960	Lower Ceillau
Church of Saint Peter	Bryngwyn	1 September 1956	SO3905409322; 51°46′45″N 2°53′05″W	Church	In Bryngwyn, 500 m (1,600 ft) north of the junction with the old A40	1964	Church of Saint Peter
Chapel Farmhouse	Llanarth	1 September 1956	SO3686009399; 51°46′47″N 2°55′00″W	Farmhouse	To the north of Clytha Park	1965	Chapel Farmhouse
Clytha Park, gateway and railings	Llanarth	1 September 1956	SO3633308852; 51°46′29″N 2°55′27″W	Walls, railings, gates	At the entrance to Clytha Park, on the old A40	1967	Clytha Park, gateway and railings
Church of Saint Teilo	Llanarth	1 September 1956	SO3756410961; 51°47′38″N 2°54′24″W	Church	At the southern end of Llanarth in a large churchyard	1969	Church of Saint Teilo
Church of St Mary and St Michael	Llanarth	1 September 1956	SO3806010520; 51°47′24″N 2°53′58″W	Church	North of Llanarth Court	1971	Church of St Mary and St Michael
Little Pitt Cottage	Llanarth	1 September 1956	SO3689109916; 51°47′04″N 2°54′59″W	House	On the north side of the road from Llanarth to the old A40 300 m (980 ft) west of Pitt village	1974	Little Pitt Cottage
Church of Saint Mapley	Llanvapley	1 September 1956	SO3667914088; 51°49′19″N 2°55′12″W	Church	To the east of Llanvapley	1976	Church of Saint Mapley
Llanwenarth House	Llanfoist	1 September 1956	SO2587713973; 51°49′10″N 3°04′36″W	Commercial	In its park south of the Monmouthshire and Brecon Canal, with a drive from the B4246	1977	Llanwenarth House
Church of St Peter	Llanwenarth	1 September 1956	SO2756514812; 51°49′38″N 3°03′09″W	Church	South of the A40	1980	Church of St Peter
Church of St Cadoc	Llangattock-juxta-Usk	1 September 1956	SO3303209647; 51°46′53″N 2°58′20″W	Church	By the River Usk and the railway line to the south-west of The Bryn	1988	Church of St Cadoc
Llangattock Court	Penpergwm	1 September 1956	SO3328110262; 51°47′13″N 2°58′07″W	House	On the B4598 200 m (660 ft) west of the former King of Prussia pub	1990	Llangattock Court
Church of St Bartholomew	Llanover	1 September 1956	SO3179509426; 51°46′46″N 2°59′24″W	Church	1.2 km (0.75 mi) north of Llanover by the River Usk, on the road from Llanellen to Llanfair Kilgeddin	1992	Church of St Bartholomew
Church of St Michael	Llanvihangel Gobion	1 September 1956	SO3460809228; 51°46′40″N 2°56′57″W	Church	250 m (820 ft) to the south-west of the village road off the B4598	1998	Church of St Michael
Blaengavenny Farmhouse	Llanvihangel Crucorney	1 September 1956	SO3111319653; 51°52′16″N 3°00′07″W	Farmhouse	On the old Abergavenny-Hereford road halfway between Llanvihangel Crucorney and Pantygelli	2003	Blaengavenny Farmhouse
Moynes Court	Mathern	10 June 1953	ST5198190937; 51°36′55″N 2°41′42″W	House	300 m (980 ft) west of the church on a lane off the road through Mathern south of the M48	2008	Moynes Court
St Pierre Hotel Gatehouse	Mathern	10 June 1953	ST5150690573; 51°36′43″N 2°42′06″W	Gatehouse	The main gateway to the St Pierre Hotel	2010	St Pierre Hotel Gatehouse
Piercefield House	St Arvans	4 August 1970	ST5281095680; 51°39′29″N 2°41′01″W	House	1 km (0.62 mi) to the north-east of the roundabout at the A466/B4293 crossing; the central block and the West and East pavilions each have separate listings Additional reference numbers:	2013	Piercefield House
Church of St Stephen and St Tathan	Caerwent	19 August 1955	ST4687190485; 51°36′39″N 2°46′07″W	Church	In the centre of Caerwent	2014	Church of St Stephen and St Tathan
Church of St Michael	Llanfihangel Tor-y-Mynydd	19 August 1955	SO4639501856; 51°42′46″N 2°46′38″W	Church	In Llanfihangel Tor-y-Mynydd, and of the late 15th century, with a two-light bell-cot	2020	Church of St Michael
Church of St Thomas à Becket	Wolvesnewton	19 August 1955	ST4542099770; 51°41′39″N 2°47′28″W	Church	In the centre of Wolvesnewton	2023	Church of St Thomas à Becket
Church of St Thomas a Becket, churchyard cross	Wolvesnewton	19 August 1955	ST4542799752; 51°41′38″N 2°47′27″W	Cross	15 m (49 ft) south of the church	2024	Church of St Thomas a Becket, churchyard cross
Church of the Holy Cross	Kilgwrrwg	19 August 1955	ST4621798451; 51°40′56″N 2°46′46″W	Church	500 m (1,600 ft) north of Kilgwrrwg House	2025	Church of the Holy Cross
Allt-y-Bela	Llangwm	19 August 1955	SO4110400576; 51°42′03″N 2°51′13″W	House	1 km (0.62 mi) from the junction east of Llangeview church	2031	Allt-y-Bela
Cwrt y Brychan barn, stable and granary	Llangwm	19 August 1955	SO4494401526; 51°42′35″N 2°47′54″W	Farm buildings	East of Cwrt y Brychan	2033	Cwrt y Brychan barn, stable and granary
Church of St Michael and All Angels	Llanfihangel Rogiet	19 August 1955	ST4511987861; 51°35′13″N 2°47′37″W	Church	South of the Caldicot Road	2035	Church of St Michael and All Angels
Manor Farmhouse	Crick	19 August 1955	ST4902990257; 51°36′32″N 2°44′15″W	Farmhouse	On the A48 at the east end of Crick	2038	Manor Farmhouse
Moynes Court Gatehouse	Mathern	19 August 1955	ST5201090964; 51°36′56″N 2°41′40″W	House	Dating from the 14th century, 250 m (820 ft) west of the church	2042	Moynes Court Gatehouse
Church of St Mary	Rogiet	19 August 1955	ST4566387647; 51°35′06″N 2°47′08″W	Church	To the west of the village	2047	Church of St Mary
Howick Farmhouse	Itton	19 August 1955	ST5022795567; 51°39′24″N 2°43′15″W	Farmhouse	16th-century house 500 m (1,600 ft) north-east of the B4293	2049	Howick Farmhouse
St Anne's House	Tintern	19 August 1955	ST5318799956; 51°41′47″N 2°40′43″W	House	At the junction of the A466 and Chapel Lane 200 m (660 ft) east of the abbey	2051	St Anne's House
Church Farmhouse	Caldicot	5 July 1973	ST4823788820; 51°35′45″N 2°44′55″W	Farmhouse	200 m (660 ft) north of the church off Church Road, surrounded by a modern housing estate	2055	Church Farmhouse
Great Killough	Llantilio Crossenny	5 January 1952	SO3823213986; 51°49′16″N 2°53′51″W	House	2 km (1.2 mi) south-west of the church	2056	Great Killough
The Pant	Llanvihangel-Ystern-Llewern	5 January 1952	SO4234614045; 51°49′19″N 2°50′16″W	House	A 16th-century cruck-framed hall house between Onen and Wernrheolydd	2057	The Pant
Trivor Farmhouse	St Maughans	5 January 1952	SO4649117731; 51°51′20″N 2°46′42″W	Farmhouse	Dating from 1630, north-east of the church	2058	Trivor Farmhouse
Hilston Park	Llangattock Vibon Avel	5 January 1952	SO4466418748; 51°51′52″N 2°48′18″W	House	2 km (1.2 mi) south-west of Skenfrith, on the B4347	2059	Hilston Park
Troy House	Mitchel Troy	5 January 1952	SO5093511352; 51°47′55″N 2°42′46″W	House	1.5 km (0.93 mi) south of Monmouth	2060	Troy House
Dingestow Court	Dingestow	5 January 1952	SO4506409715; 51°47′00″N 2°47′52″W	House	Standing in its own grounds, 1 km (0.62 mi) south-west of the church	2061	Dingestow Court
Llwyn-y-gaer House	Tregare	5 January 1952	SO4046111111; 51°47′44″N 2°51′53″W	House	1.6 km (0.99 mi) north-west of the church on the road between Tregare and Llantilio Crossenny	2062	Llwyn-y-gaer House
The Artha	Tregare	5 January 1952	SO4232009654; 51°46′57″N 2°50′15″W	Farmhouse	800 m (2,600 ft) south of the church on a farm track off the road between Tregare and Dingestow	2063	The Artha
Old Trecastle Farmhouse	Pen-y-clawdd	5 January 1952	SO4516806991; 51°45′32″N 2°47′45″W	Farmhouse	800 m (2,600 ft) south of church at Penyclawdd	2066	Old Trecastle Farmhouse
Treworgan Manor	Llansoy	5 January 1952	SO4210005081; 51°44′29″N 2°50′24″W	House	3 km (1.9 mi) south-east of Raglan on the road to Llansoy	2067	Treworgan Manor
Hygga House Dovecote	Trellech	5 January 1952	SO4855803647; 51°43′45″N 2°44′46″W	Dovecote	500 m (1,600 ft) north-east of the church at Llanishen on a lane off the Chepstow Road, the B4293	2071	Hygga House Dovecote
Church of St Michael and All Angels	Llanvihangel-Ystern-Llewern	19 November 1953	SO4328113955; 51°49′17″N 2°49′28″W	Church	Medieval church located in the centre of Llanvihangel-Ystern-Llewern	2072	Church of St Michael and All Angels
Brynderi House	Llantilio Crossenny	19 November 1953	SO3938417245; 51°51′02″N 2°52′53″W	House	2 km (1.2 mi) north of Llantilio Crossenny, with a driveway off the road from White Castle to Cross Ash	2074	Brynderi House
Croft Farm Barn	Llantilio Crossenny	19 November 1953	SO3797317833; 51°51′20″N 2°54′07″W	Barn	1 km (0.62 mi) north of White Castle, on the road between White Castle and the B4521	2077	Croft Farm Barn, Llantilio Crossenny
Upper Green	Llantilio Crossenny	19 November 1953	SO3874819020; 51°51′59″N 2°53′28″W	House	4 km (2.5 mi) north of Llantilio Crossenny, on a track off the B4521 towards Llanfair Green	2078	Upper Green
Skenfrith Castle	Skenfrith	19 November 1953	SO4570020262; 51°52′42″N 2°47′25″W	Castle	At the southeast corner of Skenfrith, by the River Monnow 100 m (330 ft) north-west of Skenfrith Bridge	2083	Skenfrith Castle
Church of St Maughan	Llangattock Vibon Avel	19 November 1953	SO4611217162; 51°51′02″N 2°47′02″W	Church	7 km (4.3 mi) north-west of Monmouth on a lane off the B4347	2084	Church of St Maughan
Church of St Michael and All Angels	Mitchel Troy	19 November 1953	SO4921710399; 51°47′24″N 2°44′16″W	Church	In the centre of Mitchel Troy on the old road from Monmouth to Raglan	2086	Church of St Michael and All Angels
Pwll	Tregare	19 November 1953	SO4098109698; 51°46′58″N 2°51′25″W	House	2 km (1.2 mi) north of Raglan, south-west of the church at Tregare	2090	Pwll
Ty Mawr	Dingestow	19 November 1953	SO4376709959; 51°47′08″N 2°49′00″W	Farmhouse	2 km (1.2 mi) west of Dingestow church, on the road between Dingestow and Tregare	2092	Ty Mawr
Ty Mawr Gatehouse	Dingestow	19 November 1953	SO4378409929; 51°47′07″N 2°48′59″W	Gatehouse	2 km (1.2 mi) west of Dingestow church, on the road between Dingestow and Tregare	2093	Ty Mawr Gatehouse
Pen-y-clawdd Farmhouse	Raglan	19 November 1953	SO4395708308; 51°46′14″N 2°48′49″W	Farmhouse	On a farm track off the road from Raglan to Penyclawdd	2099	Pen-y-clawdd Farmhouse
Church of St Cadoc	Raglan	19 November 1953	SO4134007684; 51°45′53″N 2°51′05″W	Church	In the centre of the village	2100	Church of St Cadoc
Pant-glas Farmhouse	Llanishen	19 November 1953	SO4813704110; 51°44′00″N 2°45′09″W	Farmhouse	1.2 km (0.75 mi) to the north-east of the church at Llanishen on a lane from the B4293	2103	Pant-glas Farmhouse
Usk Bridge	Usk	4 January 1974	SO3742900734; 51°42′07″N 2°54′25″W	Bridge	Leading out of Usk to the west, carrying the A472	2129	Usk Bridge
Sessions House	Usk	4 January 1974	SO3783000544; 51°42′01″N 2°54′04″W	Courthouse	In the south of the town, next to the prison	2154	Sessions House
Usk Prison	Usk	4 January 1974	SO3787300460; 51°41′58″N 2°54′01″W	Prison	South of the town centre	2155	Usk Prison
Ynys Hafod	Usk	16 February 1953	SO3755100579; 51°42′02″N 2°54′18″W	House	A range of three 16th-century houses, with Henllys and Min Yr Afon, on the west side of New Market Street	2169	Ynys Hafod
Porth-y-carn	Usk	4 January 1974	SO3752000990; 51°42′15″N 2°54′20″W	House	North of the centre of the town with a garden running down to the River Usk	2189	Porth-y-carn
Church of St Thomas the Martyr	Monmouth	27 June 1952	SO5044012454; 51°48′31″N 2°43′13″W	Church	To the south of Monnow Bridge, in the suburb of Overmonnow	2214	Church of St Thomas the Martyr
Church of St Peter	Dixton	27 June 1952	SO5196613564; 51°49′07″N 2°41′54″W	Church	1.5 km (0.93 mi) north-east of Monmouth	2215	Church of St Peter
Clawdd-du Bridge	Monmouth	15 August 1974	SO5024912339; 51°48′27″N 2°43′23″W	Bridge	South-west of St Thomas' Square where it crosses a defensive ditch	2219	Clawdd-du Bridge
Roundhouse at The Kymin	Monmouth	27 June 1952	SO5276512498; 51°48′33″N 2°41′12″W	Folly	On the eastern side of Monmouth, offering panoramic views	2222	Roundhouse at The Kymin
Agincourt House	Monmouth	27 June 1952	SO5079912882; 51°48′45″N 2°42′54″W	Commercial	In Agincourt Square in the centre of the town	2223	Agincourt House
Beaufort Arms Hotel	Monmouth	27 June 1952	SO5080812840; 51°48′43″N 2°42′54″W	Commercial	In Agincourt Square in the centre of the town, now converted to shops and apartments	2227	Beaufort Arms Hotel
Statue of Charles Rolls	Monmouth	15 August 1974	SO5077012846; 51°48′44″N 2°42′56″W	Statue	In Agincourt Square in the centre of the town	2229	Statue of Charles Rolls
Kings Head Hotel	Monmouth	27 June 1952	SO5075912810; 51°48′42″N 2°42′56″W	Commercial	In Agincourt Square in the centre of the town. The former County Club at 9 Agincourt Square by Thomas Henry Wyatt now forms part of the hotel. Additional reference numbers:	2230	Kings Head Hotel
9 Agincourt Street	Monmouth	27 June 1952	SO5080412793; 51°48′42″N 2°42′54″W	Commercial	On Agincourt Street running southeast from Agincourt Square	2242	9 Agincourt Street
12 Church Street	Monmouth	27 October 1965	SO5082312922; 51°48′46″N 2°42′53″W	Commercial	On a pedestrianised street running north-east from Agincourt Square in the centre of the town	2253	12 Church Street
Glendower House	Monmouth	27 October 1965	SO5086012761; 51°48′41″N 2°42′51″W	House	A neoclassical chapel now converted to a private residence	2272	Glendower House
Royal George House	Monmouth	27 June 1952	SO5097713049; 51°48′50″N 2°42′45″W	Commercial	On a road running north–south on the eastern side of the town	2282	Royal George House
Lord Nelson's Seat	Monmouth	27 June 1952	SO5077912728; 51°48′40″N 2°42′55″W	Garden structure	In the garden of No. 18, Monnow Street, with access from Chippenham Mead	2290	Lord Nelson's Seat
Cornwall House, railings & gates	Monmouth	15 August 1974	SO5062712695; 51°48′39″N 2°43′03″W	Walls, railings, gates	Fronting Monmouth's main thoroughfare, Monnow Street, which runs from Agincourt Square to the Monnow Bridge	2293	Cornwall House, railings & gates
Robin Hood Inn	Monmouth	27 June 1952	SO5051212562; 51°48′34″N 2°43′09″W	Commercial	Fronting Monmouth's main thoroughfare, Monnow Street, which runs from Agincourt Square to the Monnow Bridge	2297	Robin Hood Inn
Chapel House	Monmouth	27 June 1952	SO5091713213; 51°48′55″N 2°42′48″W	House	On the main road running north from the town centre towards Hereford	2309	Chapel House
Old Nag's Head	Monmouth	26 April 1955	SO5112712967; 51°48′48″N 2°42′37″W	Commercial	Formed in part from the historical east gate into the town	2312	Old Nag's Head
The Shambles	Monmouth	15 August 1974	SO5081612998; 51°48′48″N 2°42′54″W	Museum	Fronting Priory Street, an early by-pass leading north-east from Agincourt Square	2318	The Shambles
White Swan Inn	Monmouth	27 June 1952	SO5080812931; 51°48′46″N 2°42′54″W	Commercial	Formerly an inn, now part of a complex of shops accessible from both Priory Street and Church Street	2321	White Swan Inn
Monmouth Priory	Monmouth	27 June 1952	SO5086813008; 51°48′49″N 2°42′51″W	Community Centre	On Priory Street running north-east from Agincourt Square	2323	Monmouth Priory
Monmouth Methodist Church	Monmouth	27 June 1952	SO5102312905; 51°48′46″N 2°42′43″W	Church	On the street running to St James's Square on the eastern side of the town 300 m (980 ft) from the centre	2342	Monmouth Methodist Church
The Tithe Barn	Abergavenny	5 July 1952	SO3005114110; 51°49′16″N 3°00′59″W	Barn	Near the church in the centre of Abergavenny	2375	The Tithe Barn
Abergavenny Bridge	Abergavenny/Llanfoist	5 July 1952	SO2915113947; 51°49′11″N 3°01′45″W	Bridge	15th-century bridge crossing the River Usk; Additional reference numbers:	2378	Abergavenny Bridge
Church of Our Lady and St Michael RC	Abergavenny	11 January 1974	SO2968214648; 51°49′34″N 3°01′18″W	Church	On the north side of the town	2467	Church of Our Lady and St Michael RC
St John's Masonic Lodge	Abergavenny	5 July 1952	SO2983914198; 51°49′19″N 3°01′10″W	Masonic Lodge	In the centre of town to the west of the High Street	2470	St John's Masonic Lodge
Raglan Lodge	Chepstow	30 April 1956	ST5336093934; 51°38′32″N 2°40′31″W	House	In Beaufort Square	2501	Raglan Lodge
14 Beaufort Square	Chepstow	6 December 1950	ST5336693922; 51°38′32″N 2°40′31″W	House	In the square facing the war memorial	2502	14 Beaufort Square
Castle Terrace	Chepstow	14 March 1955	ST5350994126; 51°38′38″N 2°40′24″W	Houses	A long terrace running from No. 33a to No. 48 inclusive Additional reference numbers:	2520	Castle Terrace
Powis Almshouses	Chepstow	24 March 1975	ST5343594022; 51°38′35″N 2°40′28″W	Almshouses	On Bridge Street, set behind an enclosed courtyard	2524	Powis Almshouses
Church of St Illtyd	Mamhilad	18 November 1980	SO3053703427; 51°43′31″N 3°00′25″W	Church	In the centre of Mamhilad	2612	Church of St Illtyd
Persondy	Mamhilad	3 April 1952	SO3010303230; 51°43′24″N 3°00′48″W	House	About 500 m (1,600 ft) southwest of the church	2619	Persondy
Ty-Cooke Farmhouse	Mamhilad	3 April 1952	SO3088705242; 51°44′30″N 3°00′09″W	Farmhouse	An early 18th-century house 2 km (1.2 mi) north of Mamhilad	2623	Ty-Cooke
Church of All Saints	Kemeys Commander	18 November 1980	SO3490004798; 51°44′17″N 2°56′39″W	Church	In the centre of the village, west of the A471	2626	Church of All Saints
Church Farmhouse	Kemeys Commander	3 April 1952	SO3489604721; 51°44′15″N 2°56′39″W	Farmhouse	South of the churchyard	2629	Church Farmhouse
Church of St David	Trostrey	18 November 1980	SO3599304411; 51°44′05″N 2°55′42″W	Church	On a lane running from the A471 between Llancayo and Kemeys Commander	2630	Church of St David
Trostrey Court	Trostrey	3 April 1952	SO3655404397; 51°44′05″N 2°55′13″W	House	1.3 km (0.81 mi) up a lane north from the A471 at Llancayo	2641	Trostrey Court
Church of St Madoc	Llanbadoc	18 November 1980	SO3760300073; 51°41′45″N 2°54′15″W	Church	On the Caerleon road 700 m (2,300 ft) south of Usk Bridge	2651	Church of St Madoc
Church of St Cybi	Llangybi	18 November 1980	ST3741096686; 51°39′56″N 2°54′23″W	Church	In the centre of the village east of the White Hart public house	2669	Church of St Cybi
Llanddewi Court	Llangybi	3 April 1952	ST3177697595; 51°40′23″N 2°59′17″W	House	On a track off the road to Coed-y-paen, 1.3 km (0.81 mi) north-east of the roundabout on the A4042	2676	
New House Farm	Llangybi	18 November 1980	ST3726496850; 51°40′01″N 2°54′31″W	Farmhouse	On the Usk to Caerleon road at the northern exit from Llangybi	2680	New House Farm
Ton Farmhouse	Llangybi	3 April 1952	ST3649495831; 51°39′28″N 2°55′10″W	Farmhouse	Up a drive from Ton Road 1.2 km (0.75 mi) south-west of Llangybi	2686	Ton Farmhouse
White Hart Inn	Llangybi	3 April 1952	ST3734396691; 51°39′56″N 2°54′26″W	Commercial	In the centre of the village	2688	White Hart Inn
Church of St Andrew	Tredunnock	18 November 1980	ST3798394857; 51°38′57″N 2°53′52″W	Church	In the centre of the village	2689	Church of St Andrew
Berllan-deg	Llanhennock	3 April 1952	ST3570294612; 51°38′48″N 2°55′50″W	House	100 m (330 ft) west of the Caerleon to Usk road, south of the fork to Croesyceiliog	2691	Berllan-deg
Glen Usk	Llanhennock	3 April 1952	ST3633892683; 51°37′46″N 2°55′16″W	House	Set above the River Usk, with views over the golf course at the Celtic Manor Resort, 1 km (0.62 mi) east of Llanhennock	2697	Glen Usk, Monmouthshire
The Cwm	Llantrisant	3 April 1952	ST3954297197; 51°40′13″N 2°52′32″W	House	350 m (1,150 ft) north-east of Llantrisant, off the A449	2710	The Cwm
Nantybanw	Llantrisant	3 April 1952	ST4072797251; 51°40′15″N 2°51′31″W	House	2 km (1.2 mi) east of Llantrisant	2716	Nantybanw
Pentwyn	Llanllowell	18 November 1980	ST3917899091; 51°41′14″N 2°52′52″W	House	16th-century house 0.5 km (0.31 mi) north of Llanllowell church, on the lane to Llangeview	2717	Pentwyn
Mathern Mill	Mathern	9 June 1974	ST5154091637; 51°37′17″N 2°42′05″W	Mill	1 km (0.62 mi) north of the church on the Caerwent road	2732	Mathern Mill
Great Tresenny Farmhouse	Grosmont	11 October 1983	SO4035624098; 51°54′44″N 2°52′07″W	Farmhouse	17th-century farmhouse, 300 m (980 ft) south of Grosmont	2763	Great Tresenny Farmhouse
Manor Farmhouse and Manor Cottage	Portskewett	7 April 1984	ST4977388242; 51°35′27″N 2°43′35″W	Farmhouse	At the junction of Crick Road and Main Road	2768	Manor Farmhouse and Manor Cottage
The Hendre	Llangattock Vibon Avel	4 November 1985	SO4586814128; 51°49′23″N 2°47′13″W	House	Monmouthshire's only full-scale Victorian country-house in its own grounds to the south of the B4233, 5 km (3.1 mi) west of Monmouth	2773	The Hendre
St Mary's Priory Church, churchyard walls, railings, gate piers and gates	Monmouth	15 August 1974	SO5091412955; 51°48′47″N 2°42′48″W	Walls, railings, gates	At the east end of Church Street, the main entrance to St Mary's	2780	St Mary's Priory Church, churchyard walls, railings, gate piers and gates
St Mary's Priory Church, Monmouth	Monmouth	27 June 1952	SO5088112969; 51°48′48″N 2°42′50″W	Church	At the east end of Church Street	2784	St Mary's Priory Church, Monmouth
Great House	Llanover	1 September 1956	SO3356611334; 51°47′48″N 2°57′53″W	House	On a lane off the Abergavenny to Raglan road at the junction opposite the former King of Prussia public house	2785	Great House
Tal-y-coed Court	Llantilio Crossenny	1 June 1988	SO4212715210; 51°49′57″N 2°50′29″W	House	2 km (1.2 mi) east of Llantilio Crossenny, entered via a drive off the B4233	2787	Tal-y-coed Court
Savoy Theatre	Monmouth	2 September 1989	SO5083912938; 51°48′47″N 2°42′52″W	Theatre	On Church Street	2812	Savoy Theatre
High Glanau	Mitchel Troy	22 February 1989	SO4981707403; 51°45′47″N 2°43′43″W	House	On a lane from Mitchel Troy, approached via a drive on Trellech Hill	2813	High Glanau
High Glanau terraces	Mitchel Troy	22 February 1989	SO4980607400; 51°45′47″N 2°43′43″W	Garden structure	To the west of High Glanau House	2814	High Glanau terraces
Bridges Community Centre, formerly Drybridge House	Monmouth	3 June 1991	SO5024412567; 51°48′34″N 2°43′23″W	Community Centre	In Overmonnow, at the junction of the Rockfield and Dingestow roads	2852	Bridges Community Centre, formerly Drybridge House
Upper Red House	Llanvihangel-Ystern-Llewern	4 September 1991	SO4278913050; 51°48′47″N 2°49′53″W	House	1 km (0.62 mi) south-west from Llanvihangel-Ystern-Llewern church	2855	Upper Red House
Swiss Cottage	Rockfield	9 March 1991	SO4808714365; 51°49′32″N 2°45′17″W	Gatehouse	A gate lodge by Sir Aston Webb, on a drive off the B4233	2857	Swiss Cottage
Milbrook	Llanvihangel Crucorney	24 September 1991	SO3244820836; 51°52′55″N 2°58′58″W	House	At the road junction beside Pen-y-bont bridge	2858	Milbrook
Newhouse Farm	Llanvetherine	27 February 1992	SO3662716422; 51°50′34″N 2°55′17″W	Farmhouse	1 km (0.62 mi) south of Llanvetherine	2862	Newhouse Farm
Coed-y-gelli	Llanarth	25 March 1992	SO3705411476; 51°47′54″N 2°54′51″W	House	On a lane about 750 m (2,460 ft) north-west of the church	2866	Coed-y-gelli
Tregeiriog House	Llanishen	26 March 1993	SO4553004093; 51°43′58″N 2°47′25″W	Farmhouse	2 km (1.2 mi) north-west of Llanishen and 1.5 km (0.93 mi) south of Llangoven	2885	Tregeiriog House
Troy House walled garden	Mitchel Troy	29 March 1993	SO5080811354; 51°47′55″N 2°42′53″W	Garden structure	50 m (160 ft) west of Troy House	2886	Troy House walled garden
The Argoed	Penallt	15 July 1993	SO5230108442; 51°46′21″N 2°41′34″W	House	600 m (2,000 ft) south of Penallt, off the road to Tregagle	2892	The Argoed
Court Farmhouse	Llanthony	18 August 1993	SO2882327859; 51°56′41″N 3°02′13″W	Farmhouse	To south-west of Llanthony Priory	2895	Court Farmhouse
Grove Farm House	Llanfoist	15 September 1993	SO2925412772; 51°48′33″N 3°01′39″W	Farmhouse	South of Llanfoist off the B4269	2898	Grove Farm House
Church of St Elli	Llanelly	19 July 1963	SO2322214848; 51°49′37″N 3°06′56″W	Church	On rising ground, surrounded by three churchyards	6665	Church of St Elli
Clydach House	Llanelly	19 July 1963	SO2333113892; 51°49′06″N 3°06′49″W	House	1.5 km (0.93 mi) south-west of Maesygwartha	6667	Clydach House
Burton's	Abergavenny	13 October 1994	SO2984314260; 51°49′20″N 3°01′05″W	Commercial	On Market Street, now closed	14875	Burton's
Llanwenarth Baptist Chapel	Govilon	21 October 1994	SO2667413748; 51°49′03″N 3°03′55″W	Chapel	In a burial ground north of the Monmouthshire and Brecon Canal	14933	Llanwenarth Baptist Chapel
Ty-Hwnt-y-Bwlch Farmhouse	Cwmyoy	20 December 1994	SO3028023951; 51°54′35″N 3°00′54″W	Farmhouse	16th-century farmhouse on the road from Cwmyoy	15659	Ty-Hwnt-y-Bwlch Farmhouse
The Old Cottage	Treadam, Llantilio Crossenny	28 June 1955	SO3801615546; 51°50′06″N 2°54′04″W	House	2 km (1.2 mi) north-west of Llantilio Crossenny	15761	The Old Cottage
The Procurator's House	Magor with Undy	31 May 1995	ST4248587015; 51°34′45″N 2°49′53″W	House	North-west of the church	16064	The Procurator's House
Cwm Bwchel Farmhouse	Llanthony	8 July 1995	SO2835127406; 51°56′26″N 3°02′37″W	Farmhouse	Opposite Llanthony Priory, a cruck-framed house later reconstructed	16277	Cwm Bwchel Farmhouse
Church of St David	Llanddewi Rhydderch	1 September 1956	SO3498712960; 51°48′41″N 2°56′40″W	Church	South of Llanddewi Rhydderch	17417	Church of St David
Church of St Bride	Llansantffraed	1 September 1956	SO3572510001; 51°47′06″N 2°56′00″W	Church	200 m (660 ft) north of the A40, on the driveway to Llansantffraed House	17419	Church of St Bride
Church of St Cadoc	Penrhos	27 November 1953	SO4159911742; 51°48′05″N 2°50′54″W	Church	In the centre of the village	17421	Church of St Cadoc
Church of St Cadoc	Llangattock Vibon Avel	27 November 1953	SO4565815668; 51°50′13″N 2°47′24″W	Church	1 km (0.62 mi) north of The Hendre	17422	Church of St Cadoc
Church of St Dingat	Dingestow	27 November 1953	SO4571910410; 51°47′23″N 2°47′18″W	Church	5 km (3.1 mi) west of Monmouth, near the site of Dingestow Castle	17424	Church of St Dingat
Church of St Govan	Llangovan	27 November 1953	SO4568005481; 51°44′43″N 2°47′17″W	Church	2.5 km (1.6 mi) south of Penyclawdd church on the road to Llanishen	17426	Church of St Govan
Church of St Martin	Pen-y-clawdd	27 November 1953	SO4528107874; 51°46′01″N 2°47′40″W	Church	On earthworks at a crossroads at Pen-y-clawdd	17427	Church of St Martin
Ty-mawr Farmhouse	Cwmyoy	4 November 1996	SO2837923237; 51°54′11″N 3°02′33″W	Farmhouse	2.5 km (1.6 mi) north of Forest Coal Pit close to the Tabernacle Baptist chapel	18111	Ty-mawr Farmhouse
Church of St Catwg	Cwmcarvan	27 November 1953	SO4774807499; 51°45′49″N 2°45′31″W	Church	2.4 km (1.5 mi) south-south-west of Monmouth	18286	Church of St Catwg
Church of St Oudoceus	Llandogo	18 July 1997	SO5267804078; 51°44′00″N 2°41′12″W	Church	On the eastern edge of Llandogo, near to the A466	18575	Church of St Oudoceus
Trewyn Farm barn	Llanvihangel Crucorney	29 January 1998	SO3267422749; 51°53′57″N 2°58′48″W	Barn	30 m (98 ft) north of Trewyn Farmhouse	19246	Trewyn Farm barn, Llanvihangel Crucorney
Tabernacle Baptist Chapel	Cwmyoy	29 January 1998	SO2840522704; 51°53′54″N 3°02′31″W	Chapel	2.5 km (1.6 mi) north of Forest Coal Pit	19257	Tabernacle Baptist Chapel
Trewyn House, terrace walls, steps, garden walls, gatepiers and gates	Llanvihangel Crucorney	29 January 1998	SO3289522862; 51°54′01″N 2°58′36″W	Wall, railings, gates	Forming the main entrance to Trewyn House	19260	Trewyn House, terrace walls, steps, garden walls, gatepiers and gates
Great House	Llanarth	15 March 2000	SO3619008095; 51°46′04″N 2°55′34″W	House	On the Clytha to Bettws Newydd road 600 m (2,000 ft) south of Clytha Park gates	22999	Great House
Pwllyrhwyad	Llanarth	15 March 2000	SO3631010810; 51°47′32″N 2°55′30″W	House	1 km (0.62 mi) south of Coed Morgan Farm	23012	Pwllyrhwyad
Dewstow House, grottoes and garden	Caldicot	29 March 2000	ST4680688862; 51°35′46″N 2°46′10″W	Garden structure	1 km (0.62 mi) north of Caldicot on the Dewstow Road	23059	Dewstow House, grottoes and garden
New Bridge	Newbridge-on-Usk	22 June 2000	ST3851594814; 51°38′56″N 2°53′24″W	Bridge	2.3 km (1.4 mi) south of Llantrisant; Additional reference numbers:	23490	New Bridge
Ty-uchaf Farmhouse	Llanelly	27 July 2000	SO2264114988; 51°49′41″N 3°07′26″W	Farmhouse	500 m (1,600 ft) north-west of the church	23804	Ty-uchaf Farmhouse
Smart's Bridge	Llanelly	27 July 2000	SO2287313270; 51°48′46″N 3°07′13″W	Bridge	Crossing the River Clydach on the Ynys-y-garth road	23813	Smart's Bridge
Brecknock & Abergavenny Canal, embankment & aqueduct	Llanelly	27 July 2000	SO2439914475; 51°49′26″N 3°05′54″W	Aqueduct	To the south-west of Llanelly	23826	Brecknock & Abergavenny Canal, embankment & aqueduct
Itton Court	Itton	10 June 1953	ST4934395466; 51°39′21″N 2°44′01″W	House	250 m (820 ft) north of the parish church	23971	Itton Court
Tredean House	Devauden	9 August 2000	ST4775899255; 51°41′23″N 2°45′26″W	House	1 km (0.62 mi) north-west of Devauden on the Monmouth Road, Tredean is not visible from the public highway although the gatehouse can be seen	23978	Tredean House
Mounton House	Mounton	10 October 2000	ST5139093003; 51°38′02″N 2°42′13″W	Houses	200 m (660 ft) south-east of Mounton, off the A48	24061	Mounton House
Wyelands	Mathern	10 October 2000	ST5235891923; 51°37′27″N 2°41′23″W	House	1.1 km (0.68 mi) north of the church off the A48	24100	Wyelands
Howell's House	Grosmont	19 October 2000	SO4045524393; 51°54′54″N 2°52′02″W	House	20 m (66 ft) north of the town hall in the centre of the village	24134	Howell's House
Upper Dyffryn House, former kitchen and dairy	Grosmont	19 October 2000	SO4217723425; 51°54′23″N 2°50′31″W	Dairy	2 km (1.2 mi) south-west of Grosmont village, on the Norton Road	24150	Upper Dyffryn House, former kitchen and dairy
Great House Farm	Llangua	19 October 2000	SO3929125910; 51°55′42″N 2°53′04″W	Farmhouse	500 m (1,600 ft) south of the A465, off the turning to Llangua	24177	Great House Farm
Sleath Farmhouse (aka Lech Farmhouse)	Llangua	19 October 2000	SO3920325652; 51°55′34″N 2°53′08″W	Farmhouse	1 km (0.62 mi) south of Llangua Bridge on the Grosmont to Llangua Road	24180	Sleath Farmhouse (aka Lech Farmhouse)
Gelli Farmhouse	Llanvetherine	19 October 2000	SO3608016932; 51°50′50″N 2°55′46″W	Farmhouse	500 m (1,600 ft) south-west of Llanvetherine, the farm's listing designation includes the cider house, barn and range of ancillary buildings	24196	Gelli Farmhouse
Barn, Stable and Cider House at Great Tre-Rhew Farm	Llantilio Crossenny	27 October 2000	SO3776417734; 51°51′17″N 2°54′18″W	Barn, Stable & Cider House	10 m (33 ft) north-east of Great Tre-Rhew farm, the listing designation includes a corn barn and stable with former cider house	24302	Barn, Stable and Cider House at Great Tre-Rhew Farm
Maerdy Farmhouse	Llanvihangel-Ystern-Llewern	27 October 2000	SO4353315011; 51°49′51″N 2°49′15″W	Farmhouse	A Renaissance house extended from a 17th-century farmhouse, 4 km (2.5 mi) east of Llantilio Crossenny	24311	Maerdy Farmhouse
High House	Penrhos	27 October 2000	SO4084012067; 51°48′15″N 2°51′34″W	House	Renaissance style house dated 1675 3 km (1.9 mi) south-east of Llantilio Crossenny	24322	High House
Upper White Castle Farmhouse	Llantilio Crossenny	27 October 2000	SO3805516670; 51°50′43″N 2°54′02″W	Farmhouse	100 m (330 ft) south-east of White Castle on the Trerew to Llantilio Crossenny road	24332	Upper White Castle Farmhouse
Church of St Wonnow	Wonastow	27 November 1953	SO4856810793; 51°47′36″N 2°44′50″W	Church	2.5 km (1.6 mi) south-west of Monmouth on the Monmouth to Dingestow road	24452	Church of St Wonnow
Cefntilla Court	Raglan	31 January 2001	SO4057002917; 51°43′19″N 2°51′42″W	House	1.5 km (0.93 mi) south-west of Llandenny	24741	Cefntilla Court
Wyndcliffe Court	St Arvans	14 February 2001	ST5179897252; 51°40′19″N 2°41′54″W	House	On Penterry Lane 400 m (1,300 ft) north of the Devauden Road junction	24763	Wyndcliffe Court
Wyndcliffe Court, garden terracing, steps, pool, pergola and summerhouse	St Arvans	14 February 2001	ST5173997240; 51°40′19″N 2°41′57″W	Garden structure	In the grounds of Wyndcliffe Court	24764	Wyndcliffe Court, garden terracing, steps, pool, pergola and summerhouse
Wyndcliffe Court, garage cottages	St Arvans	14 February 2001	ST5184697270; 51°40′20″N 2°41′52″W	House	In the grounds of Wyndcliffe Court	24766	Wyndcliffe Court, garage cottages
Bigsweir Bridge	Trellech	28 February 2001	SO5386705105; 51°44′34″N 2°40′10″W	Bridge	Carries the A466 over the River Wye	24916	Bigsweir Bridge
Barn at Pant-glas Farm	Llanishen	28 February 2001	SO4820904126; 51°44′00″N 2°45′05″W	Barn	60 m (200 ft) east of the farmhouse	24939	Barn at Pant-glas Farm
Grange Farmhouse farm buildings	Newcastle	19 March 2001	SO4527016601; 51°50′43″N 2°47′45″W	Farm buildings	800 m (2,600 ft) south-east of Newcastle, the separate farmhouse is listed Grade II	25039	Grange Farmhouse farm complex
Norton Court	Skenfrith	19 March 2001	SO4448820199; 51°52′39″N 2°48′28″W	House	1.2 km (0.75 mi) west of Skenfrith	25046	Norton Court
Ty-asch	Mamhilad	18 July 2001	SO2993303467; 51°43′32″N 3°00′57″W	House	650 m (2,130 ft) west of the church	25578	Ty-Asch
Upper Tal-y-fan	Dingestow	27 September 2001	SO4519108665; 51°46′26″N 2°47′45″W	House	1.8 km (1.1 mi) south-south-west of the church off the Mitchel Troy to Raglan road	25777	Upper Tal-y-fan
Church of St Mary	Tregare	27 September 2001	SO4176910250; 51°47′16″N 2°50′44″W	Church	9 km (5.6 mi) west-south-west of Monmouth, on the Dingestow to Raglan road	25787	Church of St Mary
27 Old Market Street	Usk	16 February 1953	SO3766600572; 51°42′02″N 2°54′12″W	House	Part of a terrace of housing in the centre of the town	82730	27 Old Market Street
Henllys	Usk	30 April 2004	SO3754900596; 51°42′02″N 2°54′18″W	House	Part of a range, with Ynys Hafod and Min Yr Afon, on New Market Street	82763	Henllys
Min Yr Afon	Usk	30 April 2004	SO3755000589; 51°42′02″N 2°54′18″W	House	Part of a range, with Henllys and Ynys Hafod, on New Market Street	82767	Min Yr Afon
30 Bridge Street	Usk	30 April 2004	SO3749500787; 51°42′08″N 2°54′21″W	House	Only the rear wing of the building is listed	82772	30 Bridge Street
Olde Malsters	Usk	4 January 1974	SO3753500696; 51°42′06″N 2°54′19″W	House	On New Market Street	82780	Olde Malsters
Cornwall House	Monmouth	27 June 1952	SO5063512682; 51°48′38″N 2°43′03″W	House	On Monnow Street	85142	Cornwall House
14 Church Street	Monmouth	27 October 1965	SO5082912927; 51°48′46″N 2°42′53″W	Commercial	On Church Street which runs north-east from Agincourt Square	85030	14 Church Street
16 Church Street	Monmouth	27 October 1965	SO5083312930; 51°48′46″N 2°42′53″W	Commercial	On Church Street which runs north-east from Agincourt Square	85038	16 Church Street
1 Priory Street	Monmouth	27 June 1952	SO5078512919; 51°48′46″N 2°42′55″W	Commercial	The first of a terrace of commercial buildings on Priory Street	2320	1 Priory Street
2 Priory Street	Monmouth	27 June 1952	SO5078512924; 51°48′46″N 2°42′55″W	Commercial	The second of a terrace of commercial buildings on Priory Street	85057	2 Priory Street
3 Priory Street	Monmouth	27 June 1952	SO5078712931; 51°48′46″N 2°42′55″W	Commercial	The third of a terrace of commercial buildings on Priory Street	85096	3 Priory Street
4 Priory Street	Monmouth	27 June 1952	SO5078812937; 51°48′46″N 2°42′55″W	Commercial	The fourth of a terrace of commercial buildings on Priory Street	85123	4 Priory Street
5 Priory Street	Monmouth	27 June 1952	SO5079312950; 51°48′47″N 2°42′55″W	Commercial	The fifth of a terrace of commercial buildings on Priory Street	85135	5 Priory Street
6 Priory Street	Monmouth	27 June 1952	SO5079512955; 51°48′47″N 2°42′55″W	Commercial	The sixth of a terrace of commercial buildings on Priory Street	85148	6 Priory Street
Newton Court	Monmouth	8 October 2005	SO5228914327; 51°49′32″N 2°41′37″W	House	1.5 km (0.93 mi) to the north-east of Monmouth, off the Ross Road	85215	Newton Court
Redbrook Incline Bridge	Monmouth	8 October 2005	SO5366410270; 51°47′21″N 2°40′24″W	Bridge	A rare industrial transportation bridge	85227	Redbrook Incline Bridge
Gunter Mansion	Abergavenny	5 July 1952	SO3005114017; 51°49′14″N 3°00′59″W	Commercial	Nos. 37-39 are part of a complex including No. 40 Cross Street, although the latter was not part of the Gunter Mansion and is separately listed Grade II; Additional reference numbers:	86876	Gunter Mansion
Pant-y-Goitre Bridge	Llanfair Kilgeddin	12 September 2005	SO3482708916; 51°46′30″N 2°56′46″W	Bridge	Carries the Usk-Abergavenny road over the River Usk 250 m (820 ft) north of the Pant-y-Goitre crossroads	87210	Pant-y-Goitre Bridge
Pentwyn	Rockfield	28 September 2006	SO4811614938; 51°49′50″N 2°45′16″W	House	House improved by architect George Vaughan Maddox 100 m (330 ft) north-west of Rockfield Church	87504	Pentwyn

== See also ==
- Listed buildings in Wales
- Grade I listed buildings in Monmouthshire
- List of Scheduled Monuments in Monmouthshire
- Registered historic parks and gardens in Monmouthshire
- Grade II* listed buildings in Blaenau Gwent
- Grade II* listed buildings in Forest of Dean
- Grade II* listed buildings in Herefordshire
- Grade II* listed buildings in Newport
- Grade II* listed buildings in Powys
- Grade II* listed buildings in Torfaen

== Sources ==
- Benson, Ann (2017). Troy House – A Tudor Estate Across Time. Cardiff: University of Wales Press. ISBN 978-1-7831-6989-4.
- Bradney, Joseph (1991) [1904]. A History of Monmouthshire: The Hundred of Skenfrith, Volume 1 Part 1. London: Academy Books. ISBN 978-1-8733-6109-2. OCLC 669714197.
- Clark, Arthur (1979). The Story of Monmouthshire, Volume 1, From the Earliest Times to the Civil War. Monmouth: Monnow Press. ISBN 978-0-9506-6181-0. OCLC 866777550.
- — (1979). The Story of Monmouthshire, Volume 2, From the Civil War to Present Times. Monmouth: Monnow Press. ISBN 978-0-9506-6180-3. OCLC 503676874.
- Courtney, Paul (2008). Griffiths, Ralph A.; Hopkins, Tony; Howell, Ray (eds.). The Age of the Marcher Lords, c.1070–1536. The Gwent County History. Vol. 2. Cardiff: University of Wales Press. ISBN 978-0-7083-2072-3. OCLC 836831938.
- Coxe, William (1995) [1801]. An Historical Tour of Monmouthshire: Volume 1. Cardiff: Merton Priory Press. ISBN 978-1-8989-3709-8. OCLC 34476778.
- — (1995) [1801]. An Historical Tour of Monmouthshire: Volume 2. Cardiff: Merton Priory Press. ISBN 978-1-8989-3708-1. OCLC 34476778.
- Evans, Cyril James Oswald (1953). Monmouthshire: Its History and Topography. Cardiff: William Lewis Printers. OCLC 2415203.
- Fox, Cyril; Raglan, Lord (1994) [1951]. Medieval Houses. Monmouthshire Houses. Vol. 1. Cardiff: Merton Priory Press Ltd & The National Museum of Wales. ISBN 978-0-7200-0396-3. OCLC 916186124.
- Hando, Fred (1954). Monmouthshire Sketch Book. Newport, Wales: R. H. Johns Ltd. OCLC 30166792.
- Kenyon, John (2010). The Medieval Castles of Wales. Cardiff: University of Wales Press. ISBN 978-0-7083-2180-5. OCLC 828219275.
- Kissack, Keith (1975). Monmouth: The Making of a County Town. Chichester: Phillimore. ISBN 9780850332094. OCLC 255539468.
- — (1986). Victorian Monmouth. Ledbury: Monmouth Historical and Education Trust. ISBN 978-0-9503-3862-0. OCLC 263474571.
- Knight, Jeremy (2004). Howell, Ray; Aldhouse-Green, Miranda; Griffiths, Ralph A. (eds.). Gwent in Prehistory and Early History. The Gwent County History. Vol. 1. Cardiff: University of Wales Press. ISBN 978-0-7083-1826-3. OCLC 254031324.
- Lewis, C. Roy (2011). Williams, Chris; Williams, Sian Rhiannon; Griffiths, Ralph A. (eds.). Industrial Monmouthshire, c.1780–1914. The Gwent County History. Vol. 4. Cardiff: University of Wales Press. ISBN 978-0-7083-2365-6. OCLC 837982726.
- McCloy, Robert (2013). Williams, Chris; Croll, Andy; Griffiths, Ralph A. (eds.). The Twentieth Century. The Gwent County History. Vol. 5. Cardiff: University of Wales Press. ISBN 978-0-7083-2648-0. OCLC 855346482.
- Newman, John (2000). Gwent/Monmouthshire. The Buildings of Wales. London: Penguin. ISBN 978-0-3000-9630-9.
- — (2009). "Buildings in the Landscape". In Gray, Madeleine; Morgan, Prys; Griffiths, Ralph A. (eds.). The Making of Monmouthshire, c.1536–1780. The Gwent County History. Vol. 3. Cardiff: University of Wales Press. ISBN 978-0-7083-2198-0. OCLC 552064875.
- Smith, Peter (1975). Houses of the Welsh Countryside. London: Her Majesty's Stationery Office. ISBN 978-0-1170-0475-7. OCLC 868639211.
