= Howick Farmhouse, Itton =

Farmhouse in Monmouthshire, Wales

Howick Farmhouse
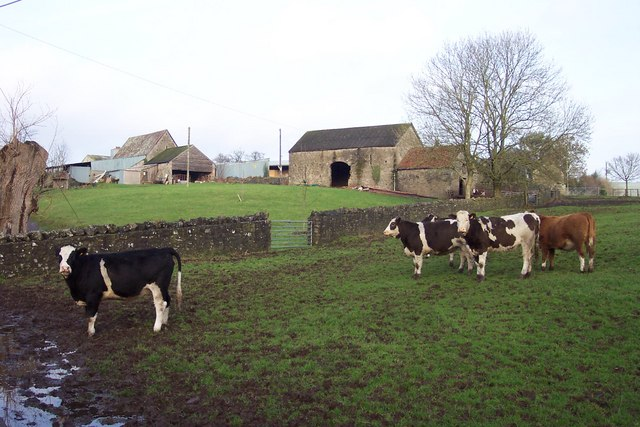
- "a very good 16th century yeoman's house"

- Location within Monmouthshire
- 51.65670°N 2.72091°W
- Type: Farmhouse
- Location: Itton, Monmouthshire

History
- Built: mid 16th century

Site notes
- Architectural style: Vernacular
- Governing body: Privately owned

Listed Building – Grade II*
- Official name: Howick Farmhouse
- Designated: 9 August 1955
- Reference no.: 2049

Listed Building – Grade II
- Official name: Stable block at Howick Farm
- Designated: 8 September 2000
- Reference no.: 23964

Listed Building – Grade II
- Official name: Bank Barn at Howick Farm
- Designated: 8 September 2000
- Reference no.: 23966

Listed Building – Grade II
- Official name: Yard Barn at Howick Farm
- Designated: 8 September 2000
- Reference no.: 23965

Howick Farmhouse, in the hamlet of Howick, near Itton, Monmouthshire is a farmhouse dating from the mid-16th century. It is a Grade II* listed building. Its associated barns and stable block have their own Grade II listings.

== History ==
Sir Cyril Fox and Lord Raglan date the house to 1540–1550 in their three-volume guide Monmouthshire Houses. It was extended in the 17th century, and altered in the 19th century. It remains a private house and had further, minor, modifications in the 20th century.

== Architecture and description ==
The architectural historian John Newman describes the farmhouse and its buildings as "a fine group". Cadw records the farmhouse as a "a very good 16th century yeoman's house". The house is built entirely of stone, an approach to construction then rare in Monmouthshire, although common in England. It is built to a two-room, two-storey plan, with a slate roof. The building is notable for its impressive Tudor windows and a "rich" range of interior period features.

The farmhouse is a Grade II* listed building. Its two barns and the associated stable block have their own Grade II listings.
