= St Anne's House, Tintern =

St Anne's House
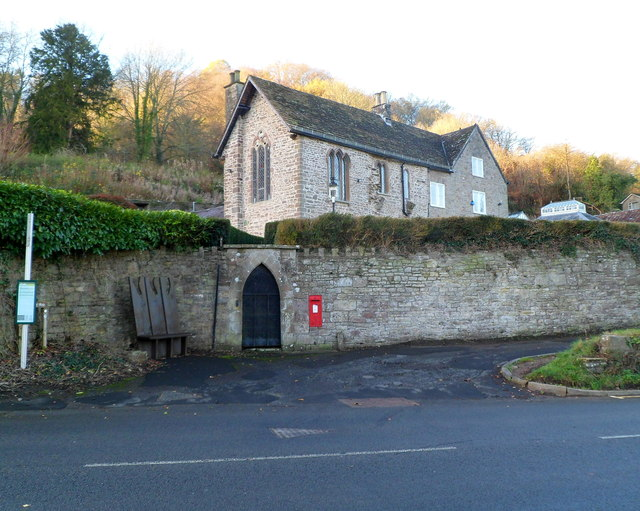

- Location within Monmouthshire
- 51.6964°N 2.6787°W
- Type: Country house
- Location: Tintern
- OS grid reference: ST 5319 9996

History
- Built: late Medieval

Site notes
- Architectural style: vernacular

Listed Building – Grade II*
- Designated: 19 August 1955
- Reference no.: 2051

St Anne's House, Tintern, Monmouthshire, is a house of early medieval origin which includes elements of the gatehouse and chapel of Tintern Abbey. The building was reconstructed in the mid 19th century, when it was the home of John Loraine Baldwin, founder of the I Zingari Cricket Club.

== History and architecture ==
The origin of the house was as the gatehouse of Tintern Abbey and the present building incorporates remnants of that 13th-century structure. The gatehouse had a chapel and the house has a three-light Decorated window from that period. The modern building also comprises the undercroft of the original chapel. In the 19th century, St Anne's was the home of John Loraine Baldwin, Warden of Tintern Abbey, who died there in 1896. Baldwin is notable as the founder of I Zingari as well as the author of the first rules for Badminton and editor of "The Laws of Short Whist".
