= Lower Tresenny Barn =

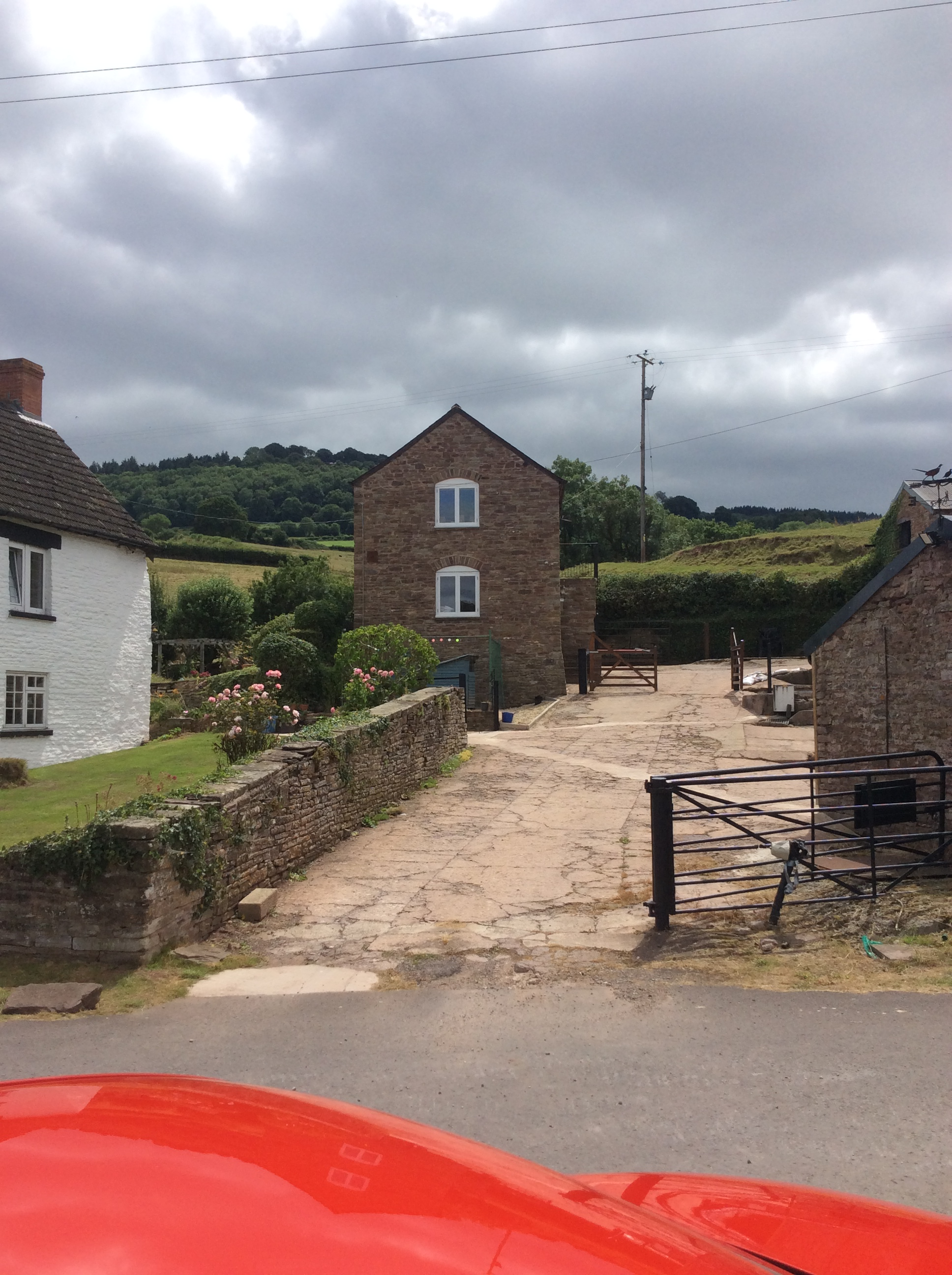
- "a large barn, now much mutilated"

- Location within Monmouthshire
- 51.912°N 2.8612°W
- Type: Barn
- Location: Grosmont Monmouthshire

History
- Built: 1692

Site notes
- Architectural style: Vernacular
- Governing body: Privately owned

Listed Building – Grade II*
- Official name: Barn at Lower Tresenny
- Designated: 9 January 1956
- Reference no.: 1954

The Barn at Lower Tresenny, Grosmont, Monmouthshire is an "extremely rare" example of a cruck-framed barn. It dates from the mid 16th century. The barn is a Grade II* listed building.

== History and description ==
The construction date for the barn is given by Cadw as c.1550. It is a six-bay barn, with a cow-shed at the lower end. The architectural historian John Newman records "its most remarkable feature, the great cruck truss". This supports the northern end of the roof. Sir Cyril Fox and Lord Raglan, in their three-volume study Monmouthshire Houses, include a detailed sketch plan of the "magnificent crucks".

The truss at the southern end has been "much mutilated", "sawn off below the tie" and replaced with a "gimcrack modern truss". The building is Grade II* listed, its record describing it as, "a well-preserved and exceptionally rare example".
