= Manor Farmhouse and Manor Cottage, Portskewett =

Manor Farm and Manor Cottage
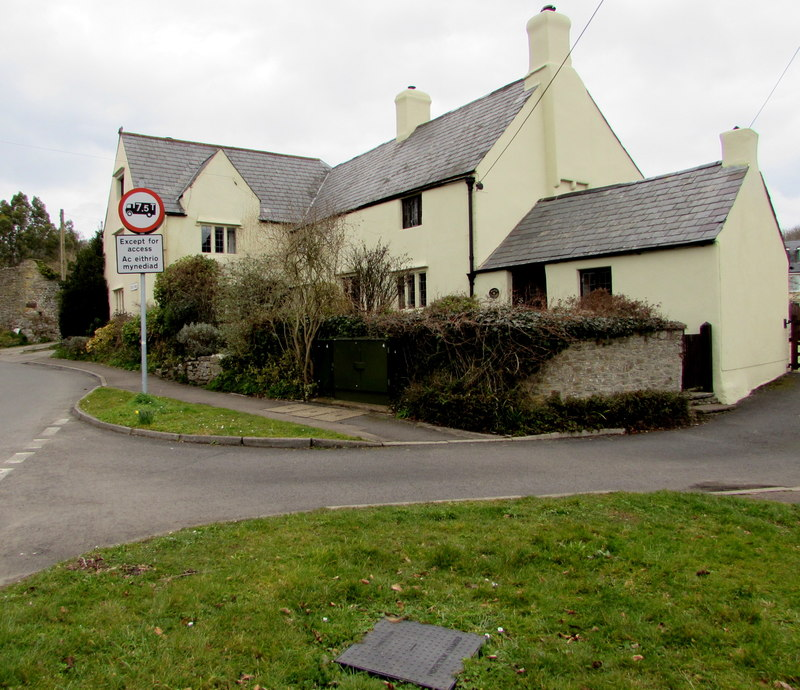
- "a well preserved house which retains a number of good historic features"

- Location within Monmouthshire
- 51.5908°N 2.7264°W
- Type: House
- Location: Portskewett, Monmouthshire

History
- Built: early 17th century

Site notes
- Architectural style: Vernacular
- Governing body: Privately owned

Listed Building – Grade II*
- Official name: Manor Farmhouse and Manor Cottage
- Designated: 4 July 1984
- Reference no.: 2768

Manor Farmhouse and Manor Cottage, Portskewett, Monmouthshire, Wales is a country house dating from early 17th century. The house is a Grade II* listed building.

== History and description ==
Cadw and the architectural historian John Newman disagree as to the building date for the house; Cadw considers it early 17th century, while Newman puts it a little earlier, in the 16th century. At some point the original, single, dwelling, was divided into two, Manor Farmhouse being the major portion, and Manor Cottage the minor part. The whole building is listed Grade II*, its listing entry describing it as "a well preserved house which retains a number of good historic features".

The house is of two storeys and rendered, some of the render being original to the building. The roof is of Welsh slate. Newman notes the mid-17th century plasterwork including a "handsome ceiling" in the parlour with "unusually lavish moulding".
