= Millbrook, Llanvihangel Crucorney =

Millbrook
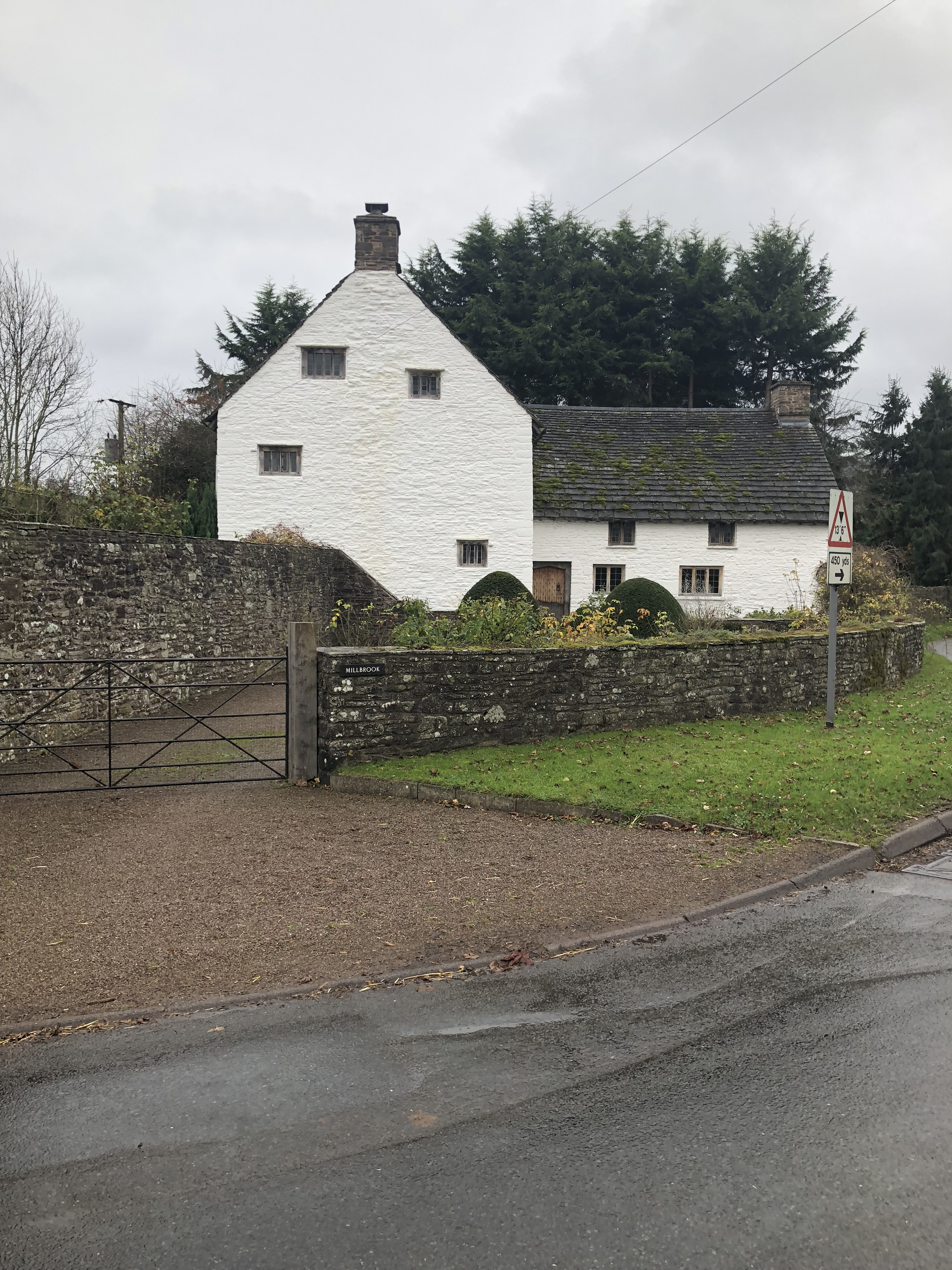
- "a well-preserved sub-medieval house"

- Location within Monmouthshire
- 51.882°N 2.9828°W
- Type: House
- Location: Llanvihangel Crucorney, Monmouthshire

History
- Built: 17th century

Site notes
- Architectural style: vernacular
- Governing body: Privately owned

Listed Building – Grade II*
- Official name: Millbrook
- Designated: 24 September 1991
- Reference no.: 2858

Millbrook, Llanvihangel Crucorney, Monmouthshire is a house dating from the early 17th century and is a Grade II* listed building.

== History and description ==
The architectural historian John Newman suggests a construction date of the late 16th century,although Cadw considers a date c.1600 more probable. Newman describes the main block as a "classic two-unit house". Constructed of Old red sandstone rubble, now whitewashed, to an L-plan, the roof is a modern replacement. The interior is largely unaltered. Privately owned, the house is available to rent. Millbrook is Grade II* listed, its listing record describing it as a "well-preserved sub-medieval house with fine interiors".
