= Llanwenarth Baptist Chapel =

Coordinates: 51.8175°N 3.0652°W

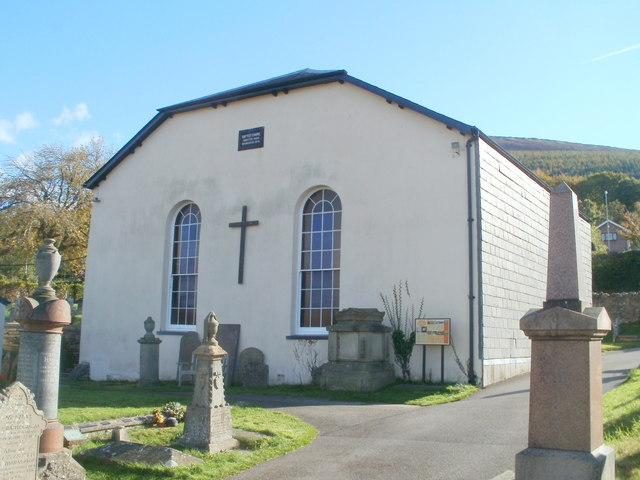
- "The oldest Baptist chapel in Wales"

- Location in Monmouthshire
- Location: Govilon, Monmouthshire
- Country: Wales
- Denomination: Baptist

History
- Founded: 1695

Architecture
- Functional status: Active
- Heritage designation: Grade II*
- Designated: 21 October 1994
- Architectural type: Chapel

Llanwenarth Baptist Chapel, Govilon, Monmouthshire is the oldest Baptist chapel in Wales. Founded in 1652, the present building was constructed in 1695, and was remodelled in the 18th, 19th and 21st centuries. The chapel is a Grade II* listed building and remains an active Baptist chapel.

== History ==
The origins of the chapel date from 1652 when John Miles, a former Ironside soldier began a preaching tour of the Usk Valley. In response a Baptist fellowship was formed in Abergavenny. Following a lessening of persecution after the Glorious Revolution of 1688, the fellowship purchased land at Govilon and established their first meeting house there in 1695. In the 18th century the building was significantly expanded, and another rebuilding took place in 1869-70. Further extensions and reconstructions took place in the 20th and 21st centuries. The chapel retains an active Baptist fellowship.

== Architecture and description ==
The Chapel is rendered in white on three sides, with a slate facing to the fourth and a slate roof. Two large, round-headed, sash windows are set in the North side. Internally, the building largely retains "its C18 interior with (a) gallery to three sides and box pews". The graveyard has a "good collection of Georgian and Victorian tombstones".
