= Great House Farm, Llangua =

Great House Farm
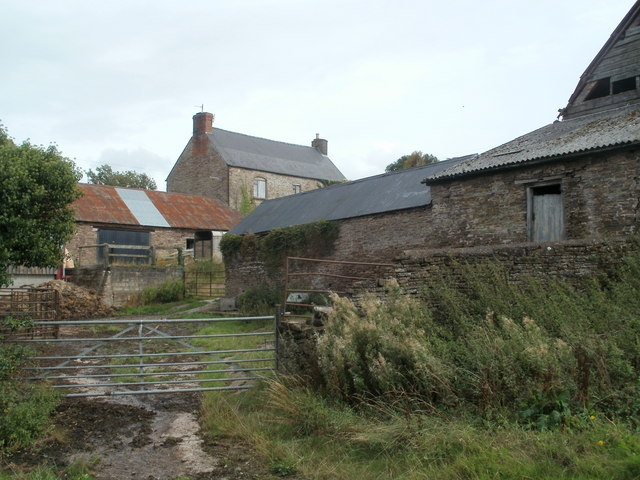
- (an) "unusually well-preserved interior"

- Location within Monmouthshire
- 51.9284°N 2.8843°W
- Type: Farmhouse
- Location: Llangua, Monmouthshire

History
- Built: 17th century

Site notes
- Architectural style: Vernacular
- Governing body: Privately owned

Listed Building – Grade II*
- Official name: The Great House
- Designated: 19 October 2000
- Reference no.: 24177

Listed Building – Grade II
- Official name: Cider House and Cowhouse at The Great House
- Designated: 19 October 2000
- Reference no.: 24178

Listed Building – Grade II
- Official name: Barn at The Great House
- Designated: 19 October 2000
- Reference no.: 24179

Great House Farm, or The Great House, Llangua, Monmouthshire is a farmhouse dating from the 17th century. The house is listed at Grade II*. The barn and cider and cow houses in the farmyard have their own Grade II listings.

== History and description ==
The farmhouse dates from the mid-17th century and was altered, internally and externally, in the 19th century. The barn is 18th century in date, and the cider house also dates from this period, although it was originally a cow barn and was converted into a cider house in the 19th century.

The farmhouse is constructed of local rubble, which has been rendered. It is of two storeys, with attics and a basement, and with a slate roof. The "unusually well-preserved interior" contains plasterwork dating from the time of the original construction. The farmhouse is Grade II* listed, with the barn and cider house having their own Grade II listings.
