= Porth-y-carn, Usk =

Porth-y-carn
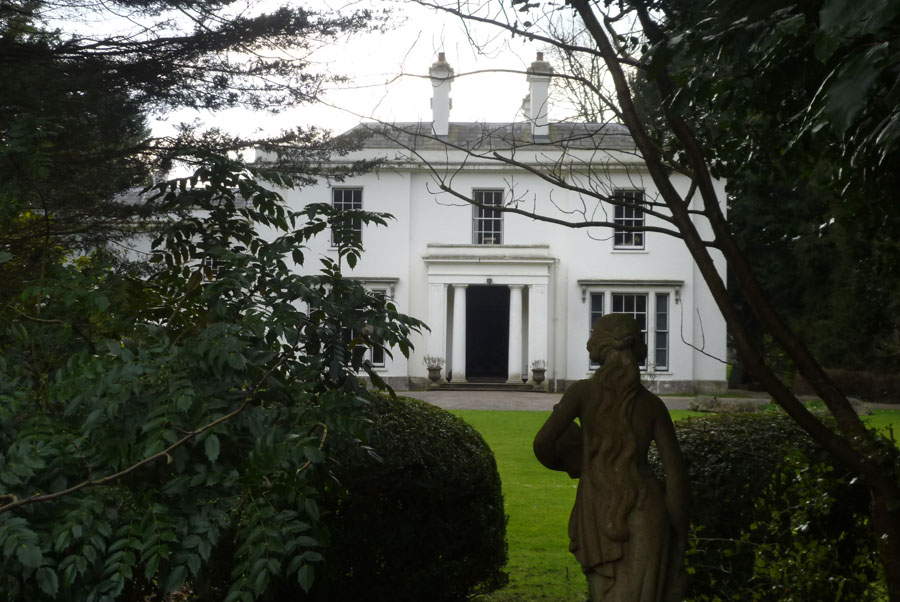
- "a restrained white Grecian villa"

- Location within Monmouthshire
- 51.7042°N 2.9055°W
- Type: House
- Location: Usk, Monmouthshire

History
- Built: 19th century

Site notes
- Architectural style: Neoclassical
- Governing body: Privately owned

Listed Building – Grade II*
- Official name: Porth-y-carn
- Designated: 1 April 1974
- Reference no.: 2189

Porth-y-carn, Porthycarne Street, Usk, Monmouthshire is an early 19th-century Neoclassical villa. Built c. 1834 for Thomas Reece, the agent of the "iron king", Crawshay Bailey, it is a Grade II* listed building.

== History ==
The architectural historian John Newman suggests a construction date of 1834-5. The client was Thomas Reece, who served as the agent for the industrialist Crawshay Bailey. Reece also served as a Justice of the Peace, in 1845 serving on a committee of justices to enquire into allegations of misconduct against the governor of the Usk House of Correction. Reece died in 1853. In the year before his death, the house had the highest rateable value of any property in Usk. Porth-y-carn remains a private residence.

== Architecture and description ==
The villa is of two storeys, the doorcase flanked by a Doric columned porch. Cadw suggests that the interior retains some of its 19th century fittings and furnishings.
