= Coed-y-gelli, Llanarth =

Coed-y-gelli
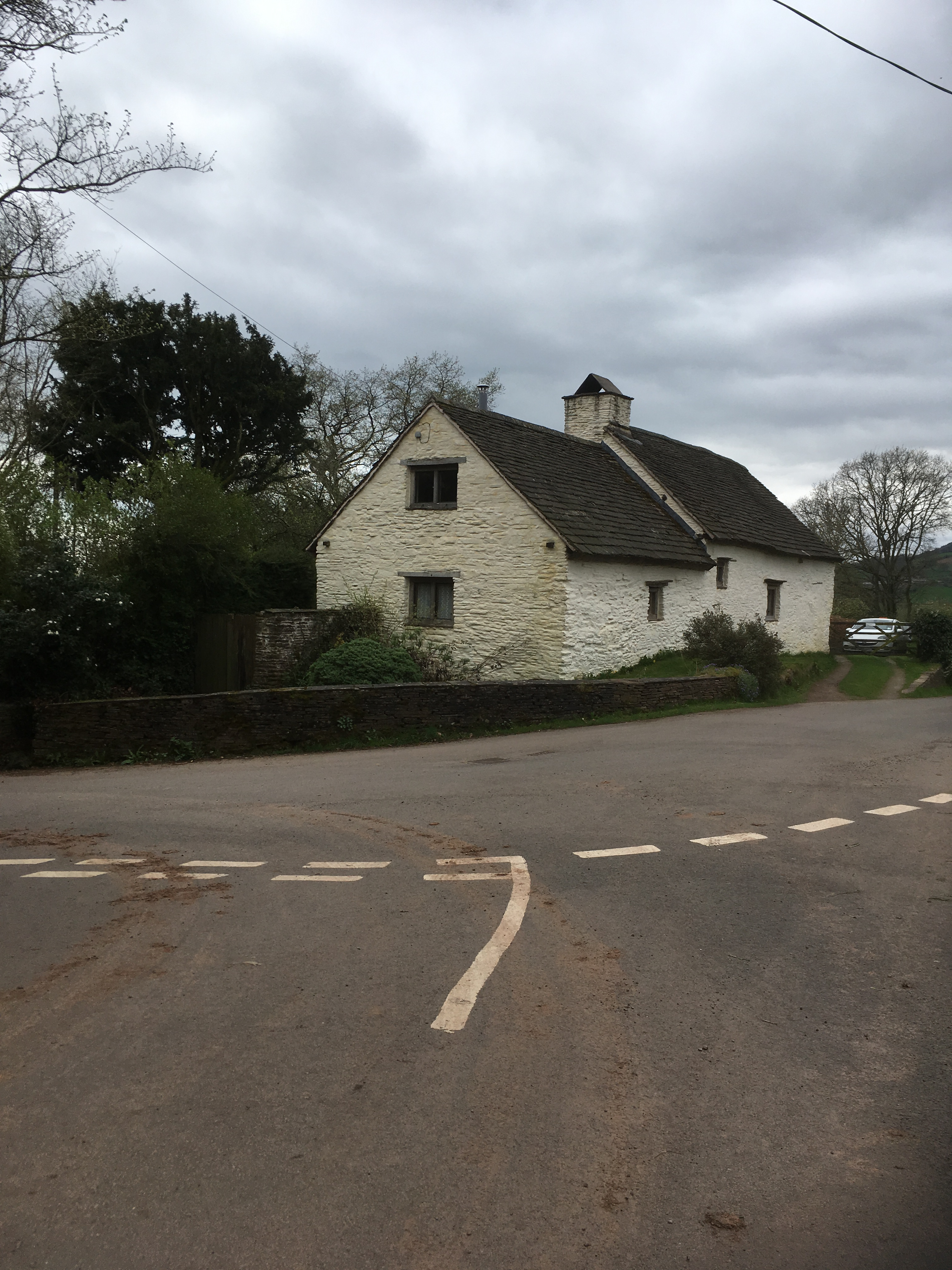
- "unusually fine interior detail"

- Location within Monmouthshire
- 51.7984°N 2.9142°W
- Type: House
- Location: Llanarth, Monmouthshire

History
- Built: late 16th or early 17th centuries

Site notes
- Architectural styles: William and Mary
- Governing body: Privately owned

Listed Building – Grade II*
- Official name: Coed-y-gelli
- Designated: 25 March 1992
- Reference no.: 2866

Coed-y-gelli, Llanarth, Monmouthshire is a house dating from the late 16th or early 17th centuries. It is a Grade II* listed building.

== History ==
The architectural historian John Newman describes Coed-y-gelli as "a typical two-unit house of the later 16th century". CADW is slightly less certain, ascribing the construction date to either the late 16th or early 17th centuries. CADW also suggests the notable interior plan and decoration suggest "prosperous" ownership. In the 19th century the house formed part of the Llanarth Court estate and was being farmed by a tenant, Richard Bills, with an associated 280 acre farm.

== Architecture and description ==
The house is constructed of whitewashed stone rubble with a tile roof. It has an extension dating from the 19th century. The interior contains traces of original floral wall paintings, now concealed under plaster. CADW describes them as "unusually fine, (a) good and well preserved example of the brocaded style typical of the period". Coed-y-gelli is Grade II* listed.
