= New House Farm, Llangybi =

New House Farm
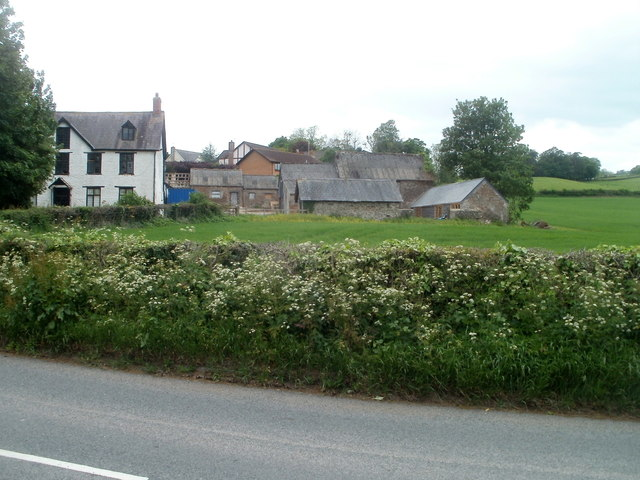
- "a classic example of its type"

- Location within Monmouthshire
- 51.6669°N 2.9085°W
- Type: Farmhouse
- Location: Llangybi, Monmouthshire

History
- Built: mid-16th century

Site notes
- Architectural style: Vernacular
- Governing body: Privately owned

Listed Building – Grade II*
- Official name: New House
- Designated: 18 November 1980
- Reference no.: 2680

New House Farm, Llangybi, Monmouthshire is a substantial farmhouse dating from c.1700. It has been little altered since the date of its construction. It is a Grade II* listed building.

== History ==
Cadw dates the house to 1700, or a little later. The façade, described by the architectural historian John Newman as "a completely symmetrical front", is largely unaltered since that date, with the exception of the reconstruction of the chimneys. By the early 20th century, the barns and dairy situated next to the house had been converted to houses and sold off, and a planning application for modernisation was submitted in relation to New House, described at the time of the application, (2012), as being in a "relatively poor" state of repair.

== Architecture and description ==
The house is built of Old Red Sandstone rubble and rendered and limewashed. It is of two storeys, with attics under a Welsh slate roof. The interior has a cross-passage hall but few original features remain. The house is listed Grade II*, its designation describing New House Farm as "a classic example of its type".
