= Ynys Hafod, Henllys & Min Yr Afon, Usk =

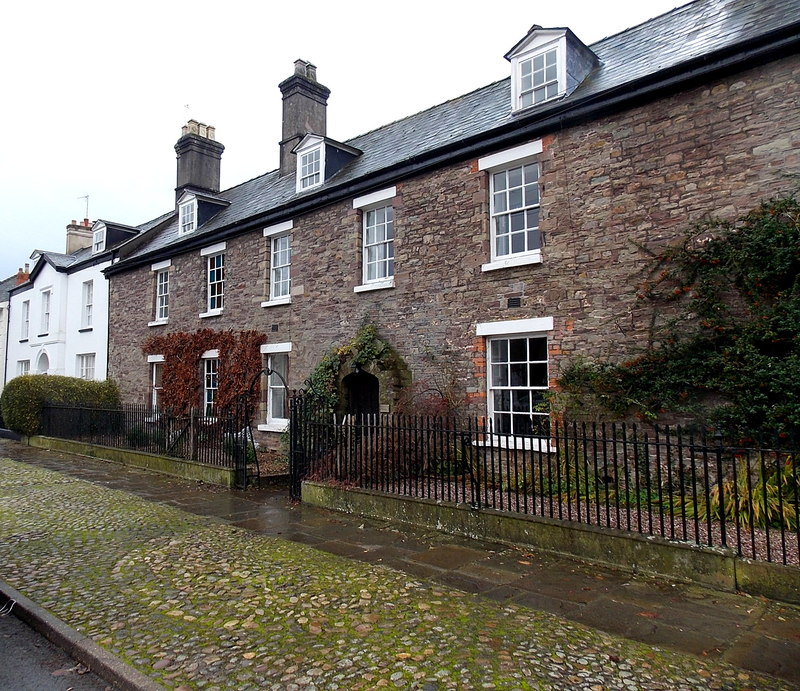
- A range of three Grade II* listed houses

- Location within Monmouthshire
- 51.7006°N 2.905°W
- Type: House
- Location: Usk, Monmouthshire

History
- Built: C17th

Site notes
- Governing body: Private

Listed Building – Grade II*
- Official name: Ynys Hafod
- Designated: 16 February 1963
- Reference no.: 2169

Listed Building – Grade II*
- Official name: Henllys
- Designated: 30 April 2004
- Reference no.: 82767

Listed Building – Grade II*
- Official name: Min Yr Afon
- Designated: 30 April 2004
- Reference no.: 82763

Ynys Hafod, Henllys and Min Yr Afon, New Market Street, Usk, Monmouthshire, are three houses forming a continuous range in the centre of the town. Each house is a Grade II* listed building.

== History and description ==
The architectural historian John Newman describes New Market Street as; "the most attractive street in the town." The three houses of Ynys Hafod, Henllys and Min Yr Afon stand halfway down the street, on its western side. Of stone construction, they are fronted by cobbles and iron railings which date from the early 19th century. The houses have sash windows which are also 19th century in date. The houses are of earlier origin however, as indicated by the voussoirs around the windows. Newman suggests these indicate an original construction date of the early 17th century. Cadw ventures an earlier date, the 16th century, noting that documentation references the building as being the property of the Rumsey family in 1575. The building was remodelled and divided into three in the early 19th century. The architect Thomas Henry Wyatt may have been involved in the renovations. The Monmouthshire antiquarian Sir Joseph Bradney noted in his A History of Monmouthshire in 1921 that the Welsh names for the houses were of recent origin.

The grotesques at the side of the front door at Ynys Hafod reputedly come from the Palace of Westminster. The buildings have separate CADW Grade II* listings.
