= Upper White Castle Farmhouse =

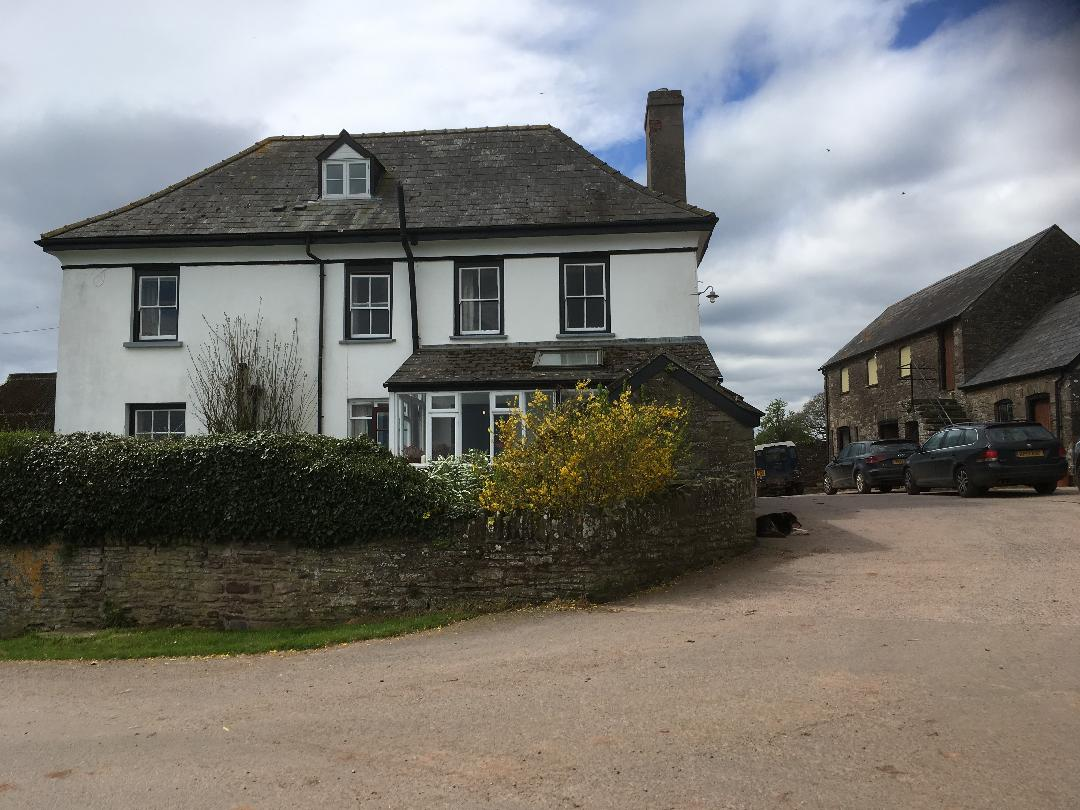
- "well-preserved interior detail, including (an) exceptionally fine dog-leg stair"

- Location within Monmouthshire
- 51.8452°N 2.9006°W
- Type: Farmhouse
- Location: Llantilio Crossenny, Monmouthshire

History
- Built: late 17th century

Site notes
- Architectural style: Vernacular
- Governing body: Privately owned

Listed Building – Grade II*
- Official name: Upper White Castle Farmhouse
- Designated: 27 October 2000
- Reference no.: 24332

Listed Building – Grade II
- Official name: Cider House and attached Outhouse at Upper White Castle
- Designated: 27 October 2000
- Reference no.: 24333

Listed Building – Grade II
- Official name: Pigsty at Upper White Castle
- Designated: 27 October 2000
- Reference no.: 24334

Upper White Castle Farmhouse, Llantilio Crossenny, Monmouthshire is a farmhouse dating from the late 17th century. Standing adjacent to the White Castle, the farmhouse is constructed in a Renaissance style. The farmhouse is Grade II* listed, and some of the related farm buildings have their own listings.

== History and description ==
The farmhouse dates from the late 17th century. In a mid-Victorian tithe map the farm is listed as the property of Henry Clifford. The property remains the farmhouse of a privately owned farm. The house is of five bays with a hipped roof and has been substantially modernised. The interior is "well-preserved" and Cadw notes the presence of an "exceptionally fine dog-leg staircase". The farmhouse is Grade II* listed, and the cider house and pigsty have their own Grade II listings.
