= Trewyn House =

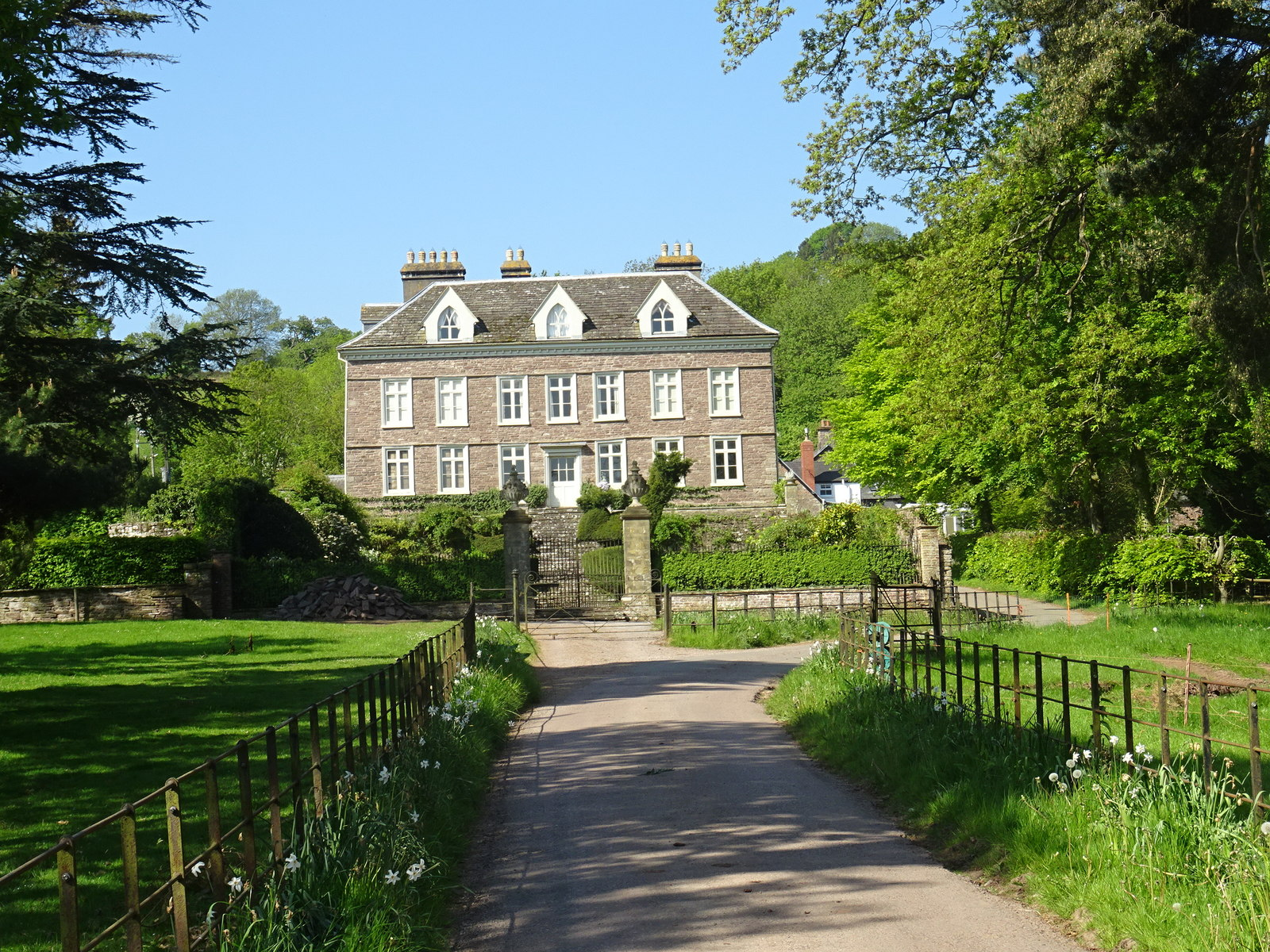
- "Raised ceremoniously above a railed forecourt (with) emphatic gatepiers"

- Location within Monmouthshire
- 51.9001°N 2.977°W
- Type: House
- Location: Llanvihangel Crucorney, Monmouthshire, Wales

History
- Built: 1692

Site notes
- Architectural styles: William and Mary
- Governing body: Privately owned

Listed Building – Grade II*
- Official name: Trewyn House
- Designated: 29 January 1998
- Reference no.: 1931

Listed Building – Grade II*
- Official name: Terrace walls, steps, garden walls, gatepiers and gates
- Designated: 29 January 1998
- Reference no.: 19260

Listed Building – Grade II*
- Official name: Dovecote
- Designated: 9 January 1956
- Reference no.: 1932

Cadw/ICOMOS Register of Parks and Gardens of Special Historic Interest in Wales
- Official name: Trewyn
- Designated: 1 February 2022
- Reference no.: PGW(Gt)28(Mon)
- Listing: Grade II

Trewyn House, Llanvihangel Crucorney, Monmouthshire, Wales, is a country house dating from 1692. Its origins are older but the present building was constructed by the Delahayes at the very end of the 17th century when the house sat in Herefordshire. It has since been extended and reconstructed giving an "obscure and complicated" building history. The house is Grade II* listed. The parkland has traces of 17th-century terracing and a rare Grade II* listed dovecote. It is listed Grade II on the Cadw/ICOMOS Register of Parks and Gardens of Special Historic Interest in Wales.

== History ==
The origins of the house are late-medieval, evidenced by the construction of the "extensive, vaulted cellars." The house was purchased by the Delahayes in the late 17th century, who rebuilt the house in 1672. At that point, the house was located in Herefordshire. In the late 18th century, the house was owned by Jeremiah Rosher, whose family promoted the seaside resort of Rosherville, at Northfleet in Kent. The Roshers owned the house until the late 19th or early 20th century, undertaking significant restorations in the 1870s directed by Isobel Bernadette Rosher, an amateur architect. In the early 20th century, the house was again restored to its 18th-century appearance, with alterations in the Arts and Crafts style. Remaining in private ownership, the house was again restored in 1990–5.

== Architecture and description ==
The house is of two storeys and seven bays, and is constructed of Old Red Sandstone with Welsh slate roof tiles. The house has undergone considerable modification during its history; many of the windows and doors are replacements, dating from the 19th and 20th centuries. The interior has also seen much restoration and many of the architectural fittings have either been moved from their original locations within the house or are later additions. Trewyn House is Grade II* listed, its designation describing it as "a manorial house which retains much of its historic character".

The terrace and garden walls, steps, gate piers and gates, which give the house the "ceremonious" setting described by the architectural historian John Newman, are of Old Red Sandstone rubble and wrought iron. All have a Grade II* heritage designation.

In the grounds is an early dovecote, dating from either the end of the 17th century or the start of the 18th century. The structure is octagonal, constructed of red brick, with a slate and wooden roof. It reportedly contained seven hundred and sixty-four nesting boxes. Described by Newman as "exceptionally fine", it is a Grade II* listed structure. The park is listed Grade II on the Cadw/ICOMOS Register of Parks and Gardens of Special Historic Interest in Wales.
