= Glyndŵr House, Grosmont =

Glyndŵr House
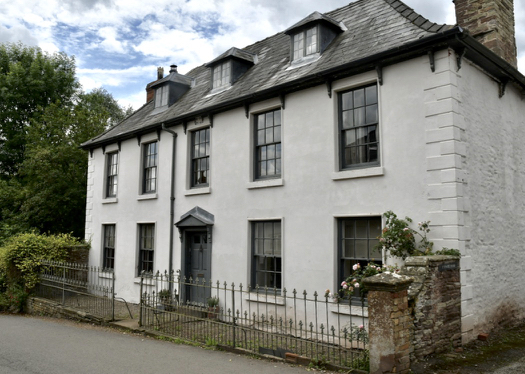
- Glyndwr House

- Location within Monmouthshire
- 51.9151°N 2.8678°W
- Type: House
- Location: Grosmont, Monmouthshire

History
- Built: c. 17th to 18th centuries

Site notes
- Governing body: Privately owned

Listed Building – Grade II*
- Official name: Glyndŵr House
- Designated: 19 October 2000
- Reference no.: 1952

Glyndŵr House, Grosmont, Monmouthshire is a village house dating from the late 17th century. It is a Grade II* listed building.

== History ==
The frontage of the house carries a date of 1742 but this may indicate the date of the house’s remodelling. but this indicates the date of the house's remodelling. Its origins are earlier, dating from the late 17th century. A door lintel in the kitchen is dated 1684. The mid-18th century alterations gave the house a "Renaissance" façade, with a forecourt and a decorative gate and railings of ironwork, which are included in the house's listing. The interior, and the garden frontage, were again remodelled in the 19th century, with the addition of a veranda.

== Architecture and description ==
The architectural historian John Newman describes the house as "well-proportioned but formulaic." It has five bays and two storeys.
