= Tabernacle Baptist Chapel, Cwmyoy =

Coordinates: 51.8983°N 3.0419°W

Tabernacle Baptist Chapel
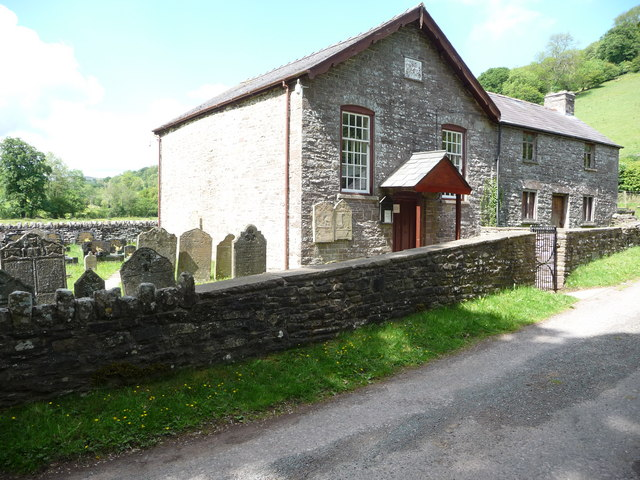
- Chapel and attached manse

- Location in Monmouthshire
- Location: Cwmyoy, Monmouthshire
- Country: Wales
- Denomination: Baptist

History
- Founded: 1837

Architecture
- Heritage designation: Grade II*
- Designated: 29 January 1998
- Architectural type: Chapel

The Tabernacle Baptist Chapel, Ffwthog, near Cwmyoy, Monmouthshire is a Baptist chapel, with attached manse, dating from 1837. Largely unaltered externally and internally, the chapel is a Grade II* listed building.

== History and description ==
The chapel was built in 1837 and carries the date in a tablet above the entrance gable. The inscription reads; "TABERNACLE Baptist Chapel ST. JT. Builders. 1837." The manse is attached to the chapel, which has a Grade II* listing as "a little-altered example."

The architectural historian John Newman describes the chapel as; "a simple gable-ended building." It is constructed of Old Red Sandstone rubble, with a Welsh slate roof. The porch is 20th century but the doors are original. The interior has a seating gallery on three sides, supported by cast iron pillars. Newman reports; "long rows of hat-pegs at both levels."
