= 30 Bridge Street, Usk =

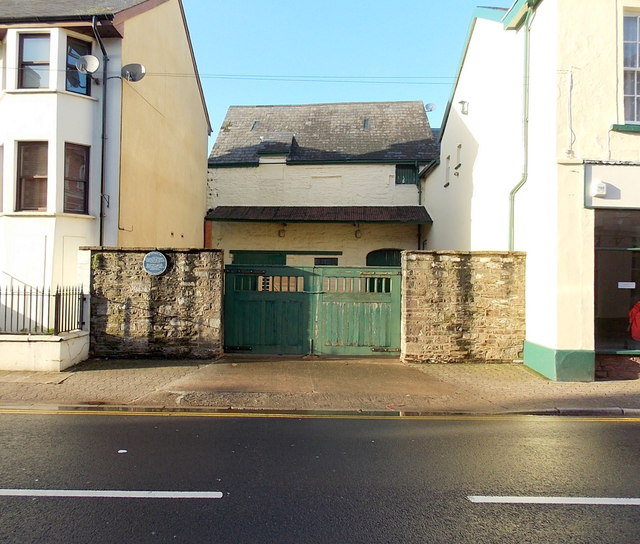

- Location within Monmouthshire
- 51.7023°N 2.9059°W
- Type: Barn
- Location: Usk, Monmouthshire

History
- Built: C15th

Site notes
- Governing body: Private

Listed Building – Grade II*
- Official name: Bridge Street, rear wing
- Designated: 30 April 2004
- Reference no.: 82772

30 Bridge Street, Usk, Monmouthshire, is a building dating from the very early 15th century. In the 17th century the structure was used as a jail and the Catholic martyr David Lewis was imprisoned there in 1678. 30 Bridge Street is a Grade II* listed building.

== History and description ==
The original building formed part of the hospital of Usk Priory. The roof of the present building dates from c.1400. From the 17th century, the building was used as a jail and the Catholic martyr David Lewis, a.k.a. Father Baker was imprisoned there in the 1670s. The Coflein record of the Royal Commission on the Ancient and Historical Monuments of Wales names the building as "Old Bridewell", an archaic name for a local prison.

The architectural historian John Newman; who refers to the building as No. 28, to which No. 30 is joined and held in single ownership, notes the "hoodmould and idiosyncratic spurred stops" as the architectural features which enable dating to the early 15th century. The building is listed Grade II* on the Cadw record of Welsh listed buildings.
