= Town Farm, Grosmont =

Town Farm
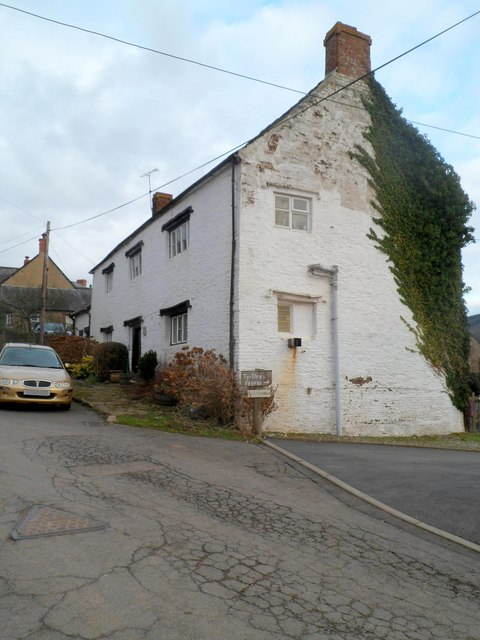
- "A fine little house"

- Location within Monmouthshire
- 51.9144°N 2.8675°W
- Type: House
- Location: Grosmont, Monmouthshire

History
- Built: c. 17th century

Site notes
- Governing body: Privately owned

Listed Building – Grade II*
- Official name: Town Farm
- Designated: 19 October 2000
- Reference no.: 1953

Town Farm, Grosmont, Monmouthshire is a farmhouse dating from the 17th century. It is a Grade II* listed building.

== History ==
The farmhouse is dated 1673, in the lintel above the front door. In the late 18th century, the farm is recorded as being in the ownership of William Street of Lincoln's Inn Fields. The house is Grade II* listed on account of its unusual plan and Renaissance façade.

== Architecture and description ==
The 17th century house is described by the architectural historian John Newman as "remarkably little altered." Its plan is "unusual", with a central service range and a hall at one end with a parlour at the other. The farm is built of rubble stone with a slate roof and brick chimney stacks.

In April 2017 a programme of dendrochronological dating was commissioned by the new owners and undertaken by Oxford Dendrochronological Laboratory, this gave a felling date range of 1667–70. The trees were felled a little before 1673, so were either stockpiled for a short time, or more likely 1673 represents the date at which the new house was occupied.
