= Newhouse Farmhouse, Llanvetherine =

Newhouse Farm
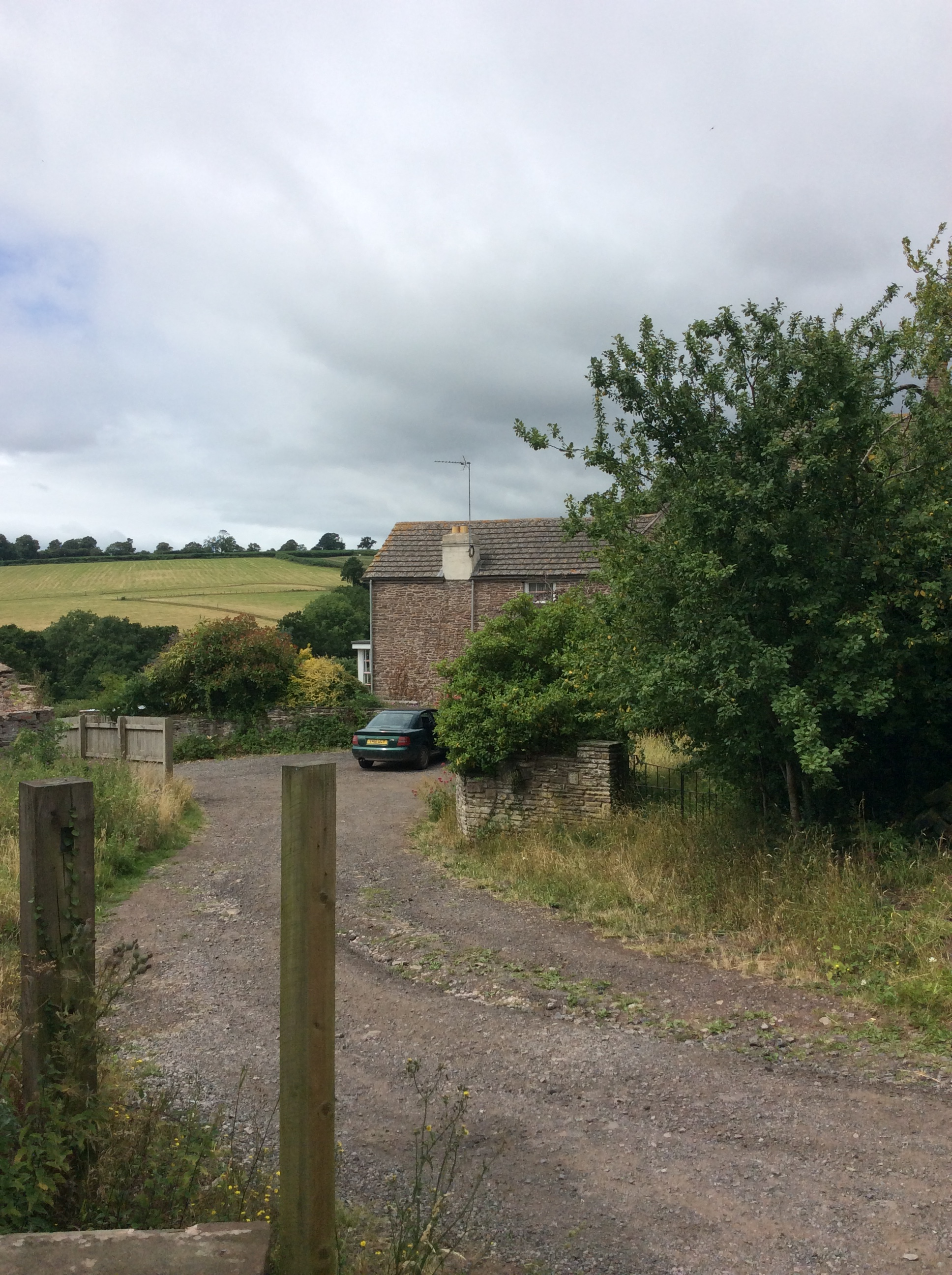
- "much altered"

- Location within Monmouthshire
- 51.84281°N 2.92130°W
- Type: Farmhouse
- Location: Llanvetherine, Monmouthshire

History
- Built: late 16th century

Site notes
- Architectural style: Vernacular
- Governing body: Privately owned

Listed Building – Grade II*
- Official name: Newhouse Farmhouse
- Designated: 27 February 1992
- Reference no.: 2862

Listed Building – Grade II
- Official name: Barn and attached Byre at Newhouse Farm
- Designated: 27 February 1992
- Reference no.: 2863

Listed Building – Grade II
- Official name: Small Barn at Newhouse Farm
- Designated: 27 February 1992
- Reference no.: 2864

Listed Building – Grade II
- Official name: Former Stable at Newhouse Farm
- Designated: 27 February 1992
- Reference no.: 2865

Newhouse Farmhouse, Llanvetherine, Monmouthshire is a farmhouse dating from the late-16th century. It is a Grade II* listed building. Its associated barns and stable block have their own Grade II listings.

== History ==
The architectural historian John Newman dates the farmhouse to the late 16th century, describing it as “much altered”. Cadw suggests a somewhat later date for the main block, of 1600. Sir Cyril Fox and Lord Raglan, in their three-volume history Monmouthshire Houses, record 17th century extensions and alterations. Cadw attributes the parlour range to 1635.

== Architecture and description ==
The farmhouse is constructed of rubble stone, with a slate roof, replaced in the 20th century. It is of two-storeys, with gables. Newhouse Farm is a Grade II* listed building. Its two barns and the associated stable block have their own Grade II listings.
