= Ty-uchaf Farmhouse, Llanelly =

Ty-uchaf Farmhouse
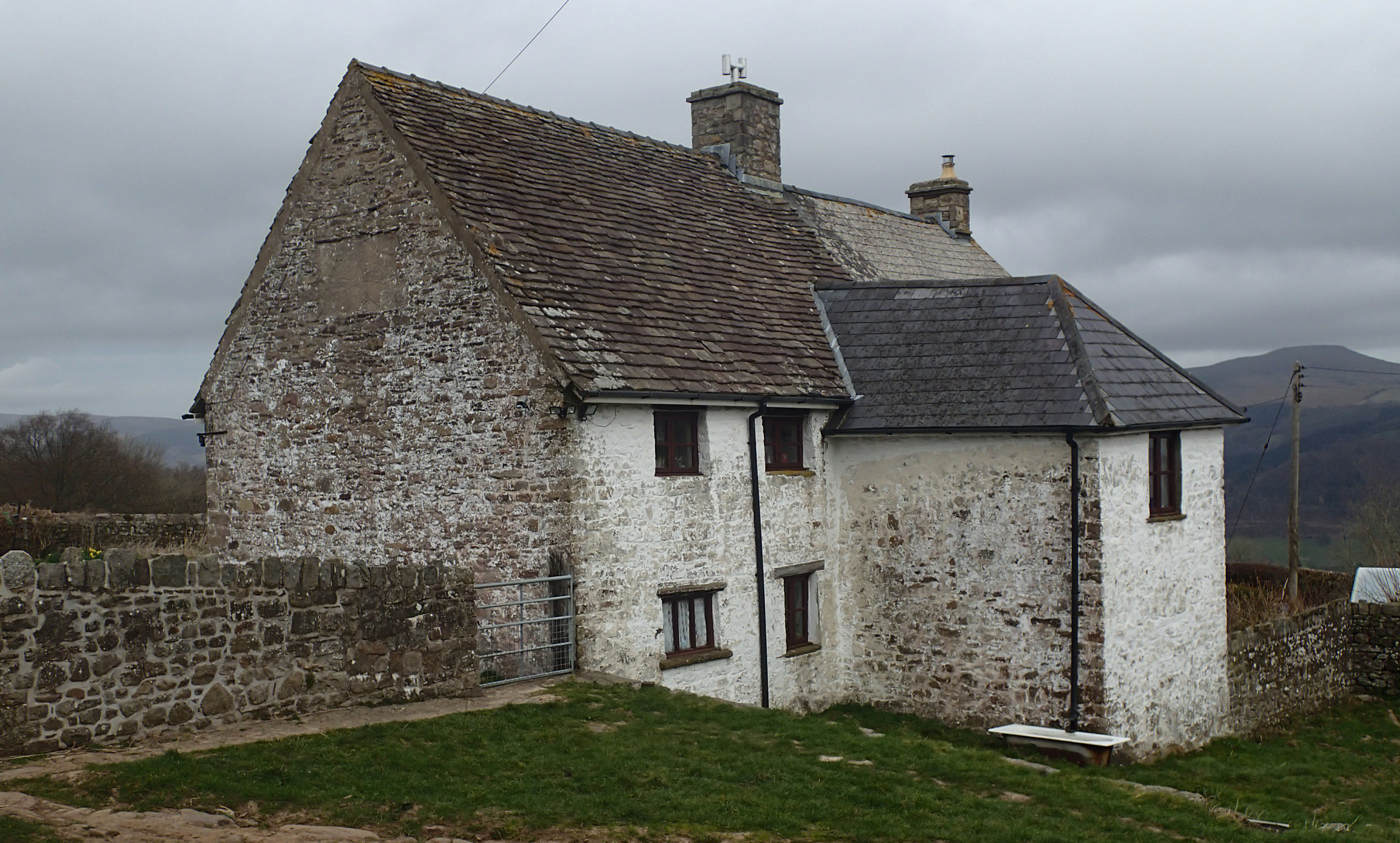
- "a very well-preserved large 17th-century farmhouse"

- Location within Monmouthshire
- 51.8281°N 3.1239°W
- Type: House
- Location: Llanelly, Monmouthshire

History
- Built: c.1600

Site notes
- Architectural style: Vernacular
- Governing body: Privately owned

Listed Building – Grade II*
- Official name: Ty-uchaf Farmhouse including yard wall and stile
- Designated: 27 July 2000
- Reference no.: 23804

Ty Uchaf Farmhouse, Llanelly, Monmouthshire is a farmhouse in the west of the county dating from the early 17th century. Located 0.5 km north-west of the Church of St Elli, it is a Grade II* listed building.

== History ==
The farmhouse dates from the early 17th century, with a large wing added in the mid-17th century. A later block was added at the end of the 17th, or the beginning of the 18th century. A map of 1847 shows the farmhouse in the occupation of James Davies, who was farming 76 acres.

== Architecture and description ==
The farmhouse is of stone and the chimneystack in the later block indicates that the upper parlour had a fireplace, which is unusual for a building of this date and location. The farmhouse is listed Grade II*. The external kitchen, dated 1697, and the barn range have their own Grade II listings.
