= Great Tresenny Farmhouse =

Great Tresenny Farmhouse, Grosmont
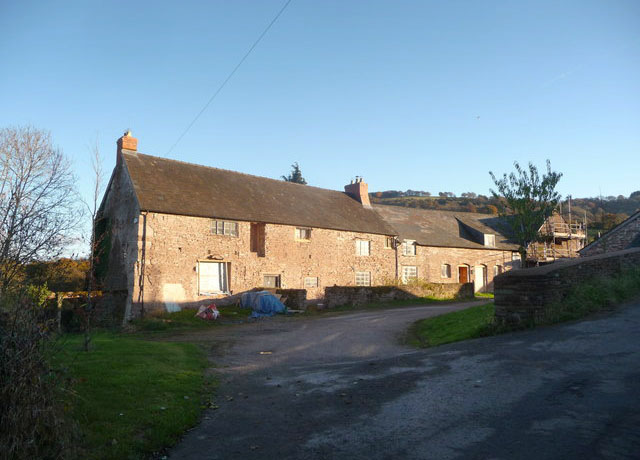
- "Remarkably unaltered and substantial farmhouse of circa 1600"

- Location within Monmouthshire
- 51.9122°N 2.8685°W
- Type: House
- Location: Grosmont, Monmouthshire

History
- Built: c1600

Site notes
- Architectural style: Vernacular
- Governing body: Privately owned

Listed Building – Grade II*
- Official name: Great Tresenny Farmhouse also known as Upper Tresenny
- Designated: 10 November 1983
- Reference no.: 2763

Great Tresenny Farmhouse, Grosmont, Monmouthshire is a farmhouse dating from c.1600. Situated just to the south of the village, the farmhouse is a Grade II* listed building.

== History ==
The origins of the house are of about 1600. Sir Cyril Fox and Lord Raglan, who refer to the house as "Upper Tresenny" in their three-volume guide Monmouthshire Houses, consider that the style of the stone staircase supports this early dating. In about 1610, the parlour block was added to the existing hall block. Cadw records Fox and Raglan's explanation for the hiatus in building what was clearly intended as a single structure, namely that the 1600s house was constructed next to an earlier medieval hall house which was then demolished when the builders were ready to construct the adjacent parlour block. Further extensions were undertaken in the 17th century. The farmhouse remains a private residence.

== Architecture and description ==
The architectural historian John Newman describes Great Tresenny as "a fine unmodernised farmstead". It is of two storeys with the hall to the north, parlour to the south, and service rooms in the centre. The partitions on the ground floor which were noted by Fox and Raglan are "no longer visible". The farmhouse is constructed of old red sandstone rubble which was once white-washed. Fox and Raglan note the exceptional height of the ground-floor rooms, indicating "the importance of the house" which is a Grade II* listed building.
