= Grange Farmhouse farm buildings, Newcastle, Monmouthshire =

Grange Farmhouse farm buildings
- "an impressive and exceptionally complete complex of early 18th century farm buildings"

- Location within Monmouthshire
- 51.8453°N 2.7959°W
- Type: Farm buildings
- Location: Newcastle, Monmouthshire

History
- Built: Early 18th century

Site notes
- Architectural style: Vernacular
- Governing body: Privately owned

Listed Building – Grade II*
- Official name: Farmstead complex of Grange Farmhouse including walled poultry enclosure
- Designated: 19 March 2001
- Reference no.: 25039

Listed Building – Grade II
- Official name: The Grange Farmhouse
- Designated: 19 March 2001
- Reference no.: 25038

The farmstead complex of Grange Farmhouse, Newcastle, Monmouthshire is a grouping of early-18th-century farm buildings. It comprises a stable, two barns, two cow houses, a shelter-shed and a poultry enclosure with a duckpond. The complex is listed Grade II*, the associated farmhouse having a separate Grade II listing.

== History and description ==
The complex appears to have been built in two phases, from the early 18th century. The more southernly of the two barns carries a datestone inscribed "1702". The complex is on a surprisingly large scale for a relatively minor farm, but Cadw can suggest no explanation for this.

The grouping surrounds a farmyard and consists of a stable, two barns, a couple of cow houses, a shelter shed and a walled poultry enclosure with adjacent duckpond. The buildings of constructed of Old Red Sandstone rubble, a traditional material for Monmouthshire. The roofs, originally of slate, are now of corrugated iron sheeting. The complex has a Grade II* listing, its record describing is as "an impressive and exceptionally complete complex of early-18th-century farm buildings". The associated farmhouse has its own listing of Grade II.
