= Ty-mawr Farmhouse, Cwmyoy =

Ty-mawr Farmhouse, Ffwthog, Cwmyoy
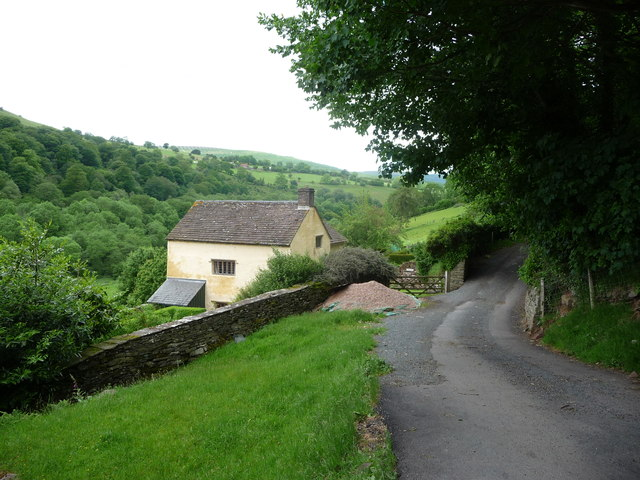
- "a well-preserved 17th century house"

- Location within Monmouthshire
- 51.9031°N 3.0424°W
- Type: House
- Location: Cwmyoy, Monmouthshire

History
- Built: early 16th century and later

Site notes
- Architectural style: Vernacular
- Governing body: Privately owned

Listed Building – Grade II*
- Official name: Ty-mawr Farmhouse
- Designated: 11 April 1996
- Reference no.: 18111

Listed Building – Grade II
- Official name: Barn Range at Ty-Mawr
- Designated: 11 April 1996
- Reference no.: 18112

Listed Building – Grade II
- Official name: Bee bole at Ty-mawr Farm
- Designated: 29 January 1998
- Reference no.: 19256

Ty-mawr Farmhouse, Ffwthog, Cwmyoy, Monmouthshire, is a farmhouse dating from the early 16th century, which was extended in the 17th century and then reduced in size in the 18th century. The farmhouse is a Grade II* listed building, with its range of barns and its bee shelter having separate Grade II listed building designations.

== History ==
The original farmhouse dates from the early 16th century. In the 17th century, the house was extended and a new range constructed to a traditional H-plan. In the 18th century, the building was reduced in size, particularly impacting on the original 16th-century building, of which little remains but the two-storey porch, which formed the dairy to the 18th century house. The farmhouse remains a private residence and the architectural historian John Newman remarks on a "careful restoration" dating from 1995 to 1996.

== Architecture and description ==
Cadw records that the farmhouse is of two storeys with attics. The building is of stone, which has been rendered, under a stone tile roof. The interior shows evidence that the farmhouse may have housed two separate households in the 17th century. The farmhouse is listed Grade II*. Adjacent to the house is the "impressive" seven-bay barn dating from the 17th century, which has its own Grade II listing. There is also a Grade II listed bee-shelter, which may date from the 19th century or may be earlier. In 2013 the bee-shelter was on the Brecon Beacons National Park Buildings at risk register.
