= Trewyn Farm barn, Llanvihangel Crucorney =

Barn at Trewyn Farm
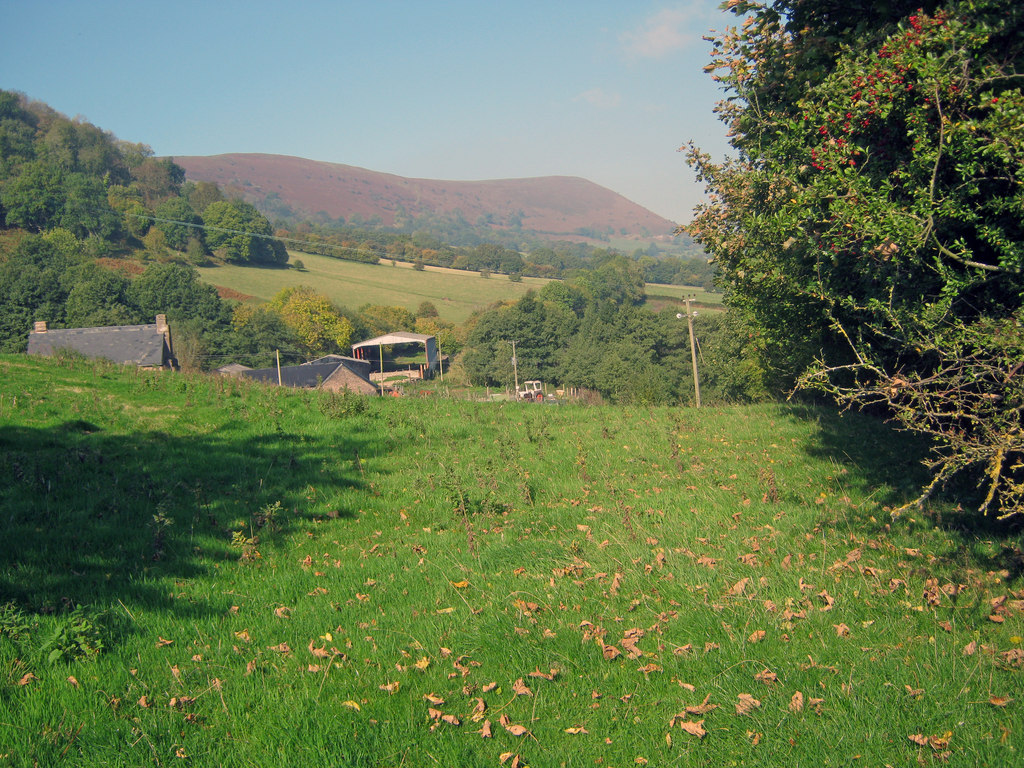
- "an unusually good C16 cruck barn"

- Location within Monmouthshire
- 51.8992°N 2.9799°W
- Type: Barn
- Location: Llanvihangel Crucorney, Monmouthshire

History
- Built: 16th century

Site notes
- Architectural style: Vernacular
- Governing body: Privately owned

Listed Building – Grade II*
- Official name: Barn at Trewyn Farm
- Designated: 29 January 1998
- Reference no.: 19246

Listed Building – Grade II
- Official name: Old Farmhouse at Trewyn Farm
- Designated: 29 January 1998
- Reference no.: 19247

Listed Building – Grade II
- Official name: Trewyn Farmhouse
- Designated: 29 January 1998
- Reference no.: 19248

The barn at Trewyn Farm, Llanvihangel Crucorney, Monmouthshire is part of a complex of farm buildings dating from the late 16th century. The barn has a Grade II* listing, with the Old farmhouse at Trewyn Farm and Trewyn Farmhouse having separate Grade II listings.

== History and description ==
The old farmhouse at Trewyn is an early 16th century hall house. Refurbished in the 19th century, it is largely unaltered since that date and is constructed of Old Red Sandstone rubble. The interior roof timbers are heavily smoke-blackened, indicating the presence of an open hearth at the time of its original construction. In the late 17th century, possibly as late as 1700, the new farmhouse was built across the farmyard. Reconstructed in the Victorian era, the building is of three storeys and of cement rendered sandstone rubble. Both the old and the new farmhouses have Grade II listings. The barn is, architecturally, the most important element of the farmstead which is reflected in its Grade II* listing. Dating originally from the 16th century, it was extended in the 17th. It has four cruck trusses although the present roof is of corrugated iron dating from the 20th century. Cadw describes it as "an unusually good cruck barn".
