= Cwm Bwchel Farmhouse, Llanthony =

Cwm Bwchel Farmhouse
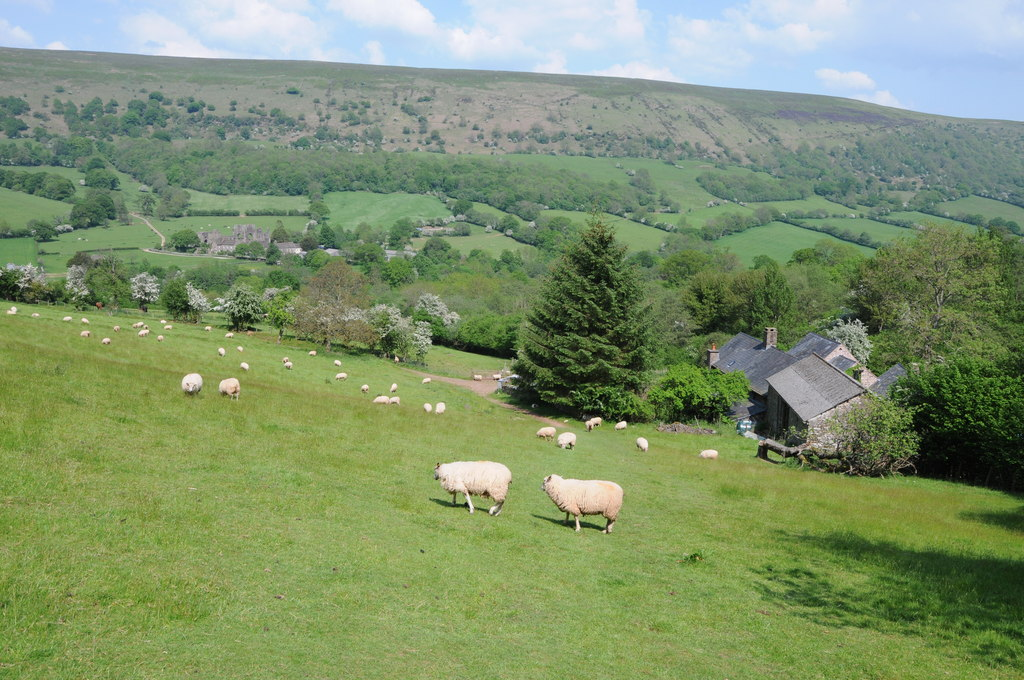
- "Another inaccessible farmstead"

- Location within Monmouthshire
- 51.9405°N 3.0437°W
- Type: Farmhouse
- Location: Llanthony, Monmouthshire

Site notes
- Architectural style: Vernacular
- Governing body: Privately owned

Listed Building – Grade II*
- Official name: Cwm Bwchel Farmhouse
- Designated: 7 August 1995
- Reference no.: 16277

Listed Building – Grade II
- Official name: Barn at Cwm Bwchel Farm
- Designated: 7 August 1995
- Reference no.: 16278

Listed Building – Grade II
- Official name: Former External Kitchen at Cwm Bwchel Farm
- Designated: 7 August 1995
- Reference no.: 16279

Listed Building – Grade II
- Official name: Stable Range at Cwm Bwchel Farm
- Designated: 7 August 1995
- Reference no.: 16280

Cwm Bwchel Farmhouse, Llanthony, Monmouthshire is a farmhouse dating from the late medieval period. It carries a date stone of 1694, which probably refers to a period of reconstruction. The farmhouse is Grade II* listed and a number of the ancillary buildings on the farmstead have their own Grade II listings.

== History and description ==
The architectural historian John Newman describes Cwm Bwchel as an "inaccessible farmstead". The farm is sited on a hill overlooking Llanthony Priory. Cadw gives a construction date of the late medieval period. Newman notes the date stone on the doorcase with the owner's initials and a date of 1694. Cadw attributes this to a 17th-century reconstruction. The house was refaced in the 18th and 19th centuries. It remains a private home, and the 20th century saw further remodelling of the ancillary buildings.

Cwm Bwchel is constructed of Old Red Sandstone rubble under a roof of Welsh slate. The farmhouse is Grade II* listed, with the barn, former kitchen and stables having their own Grade II listings.
