= Ty-Cooke Farmhouse, Mamhilad =

Ty-Cooke Farmhouse
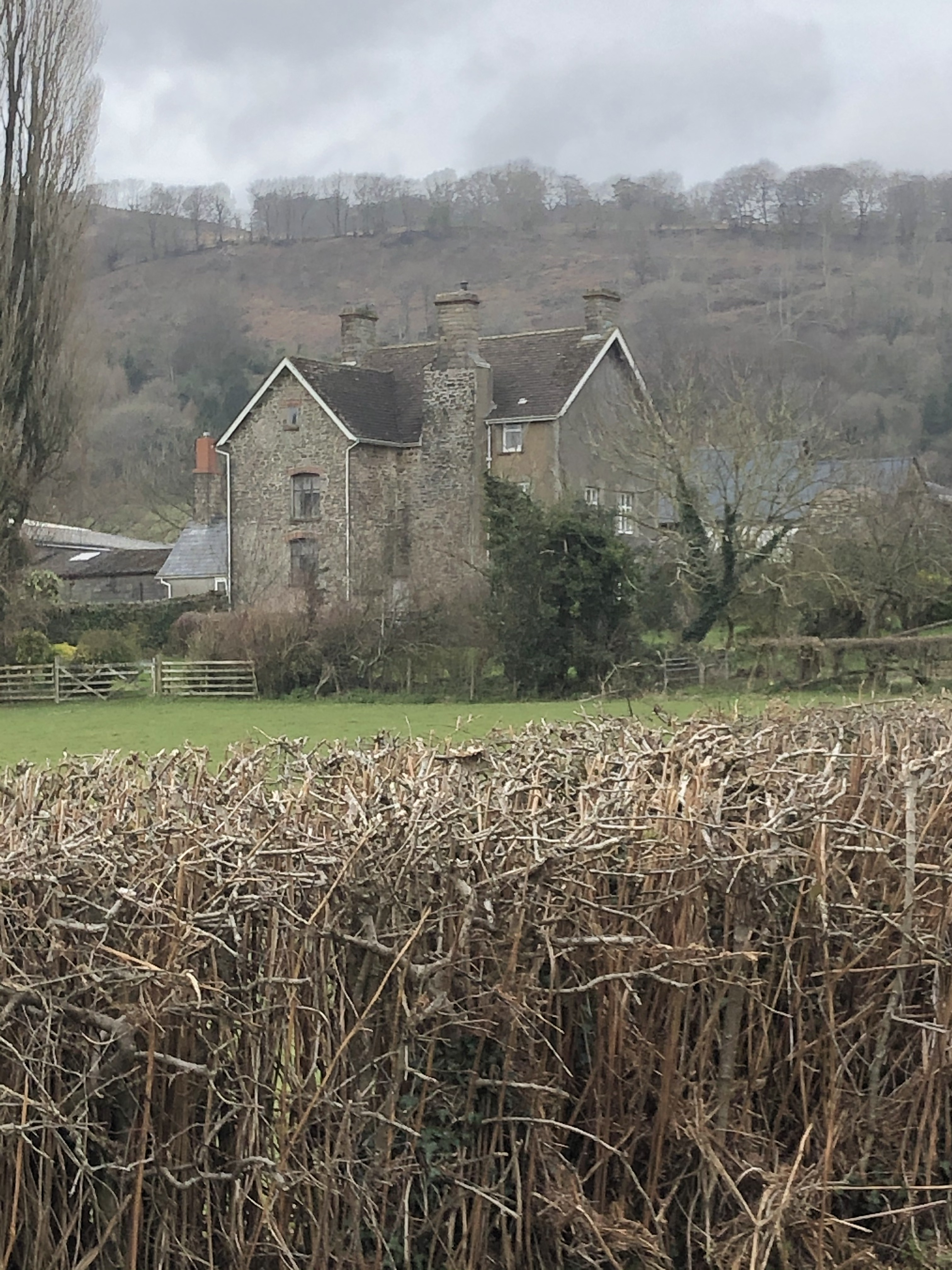
- "The approach is inviting"

- Location within Monmouthshire
- 51.741626209588°N 3.0023716267303°W
- Type: Farmhouse
- Location: Mamhilad, Monmouthshire

History
- Built: C.1710

Site notes
- Architectural style: vernacular
- Governing body: Privately owned

Listed Building – Grade II*
- Official name: Ty-Cooke Farmhouse
- Designated: 4 March 1952
- Reference no.: 2623

Listed Building – Grade II
- Official name: Former Farmhouse to the north of Ty-Cooke Farmhouse
- Designated: 4 March 1952
- Reference no.: 2624

Listed Building – Grade II
- Official name: Garden Wall and Arch at entrance to Ty-Cooke
- Designated: 18 July 2001
- Reference no.: 25568

Ty-Cooke Farmhouse, Mamhilad, Monmouthshire is a large farmhouse dating from 1710. The farmhouse forms a group with an earlier farmhouse, dating from circa 1600. The main farmhouse was constructed for Thomas Cooke, the manager of the Hanbury ironworks at Pontypool. The farmhouse is Grade II* listed, while the old farm, and the wall and gate to the property have their own Grade II Listings.

== History ==
The farmhouse was built for Thomas Cooke, across a yard from the original farmhouse. At some point in the 19th century, the old farmhouse was converted to agricultural use. Ty-Cooke was subject to "unfortunate(.)" renovations in the 19th/20th centuries, including pebbledashing of the walls and reconstruction of the roof.

== Architecture and description ==
The architectural historian John Newman describes the approach to the new farmhouse, through the listed wall and gate, as "inviting". The construction is of Old Red Sandstone rubble. The interior contains a "lusciously carved" marble chimneypiece that comes from Maindiff Court, Abergavenny. Ty-Cooke Farmhouse is a Grade II* listed building.
