= Olde Malsters, Usk =

Olde Malsters
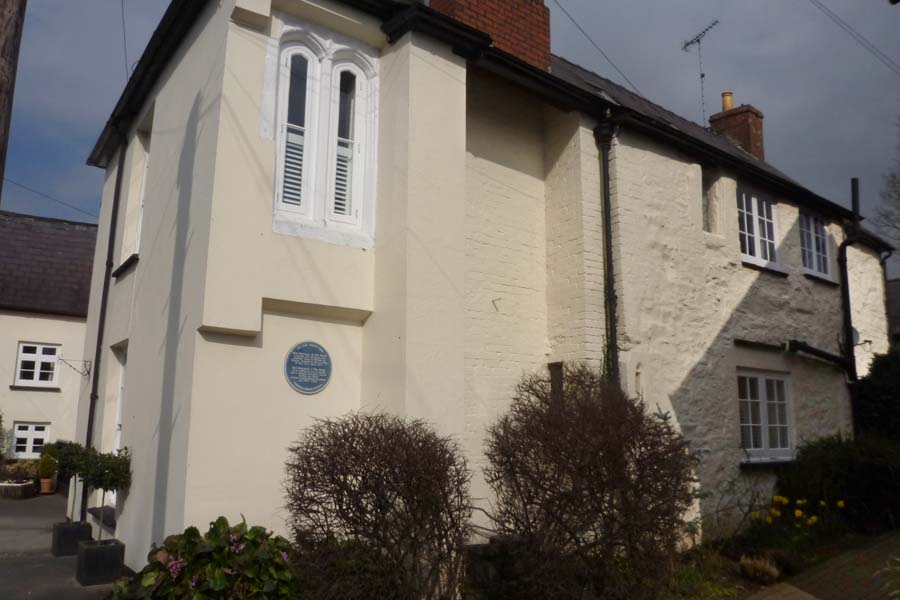

- Location within Monmouthshire
- 51.7015°N 2.9053°W
- Type: House
- Location: Usk, Monmouthshire

History
- Built: Medieval

Site notes
- Architectural style: Vernacular
- Governing body: Privately owned

Listed Building – Grade II*
- Official name: Olde Malsters
- Designated: 1 April 1974
- Reference no.: 82780

Olde Malsters, 11 New Market Street, Usk, Monmouthshire is a remnant of a large house of late medieval origins. The existing building comprises the cross-wing and a passage from the original townhouse. It is a Grade II* listed building.

== History ==
The architectural historian John Newman, whose Buildings of Wales:Gwent/ Monmouthshire refers to the building as ""Olde Maltsters", describes the house as "late-medieval" in origin.

== Architecture and description ==
The building originally incorporated a hall, which now forms part of No.9, New Market Street. The building is of stone, under a slate roof, and is part-rendered in stucco. It is a Grade II* listed building.
