= Ty-asch, Mamhilad =

16th century farmhouse in Monmouthshire, Wales

Ty-asch
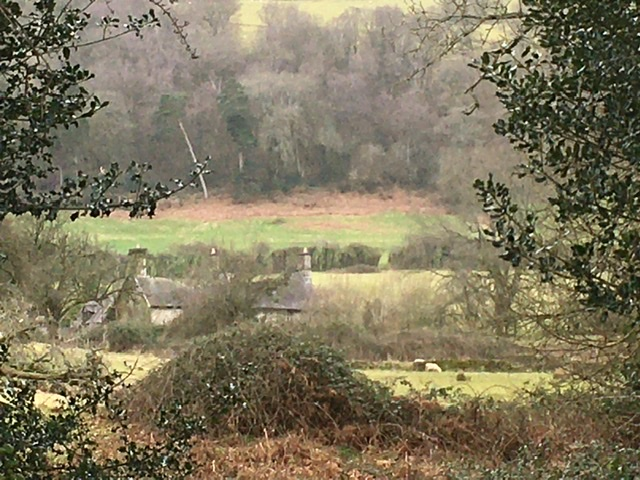
- "extraordinarily unaltered"

- Location within Monmouthshire
- 51.7255°N 3.0158°W
- Type: Farmhouse
- Location: Mamhilad, Monmouthshire

History
- Built: late 16th century

Site notes
- Architectural style: Vernacular
- Governing body: Privately owned

Listed Building – Grade II*
- Official name: Ty-asch
- Designated: 18 July 2001
- Reference no.: 25578

Ty-asch, Mamhilad, Monmouthshire is a farmhouse dating from the late 16th century. Largely unaltered since its construction, Ty-asch is a Grade II* listed building.

== History and description ==
The farmhouse dates from the late 16th century and is constructed to a two-cell plan. By 1650, a bakehouse had been built adjacent to the main structure. In the 19th century, the windows were replaced with Victorian casements. The farmhouse of a working farm until the 1930s, at which point it was put to use as a cow shelter. It was then unaltered until converted back to residential use in the 21st century. It remains a private home. The house is not mentioned in John Newman's Gwent/Monmouthshire Pevsner, its listing in 2001 post-dating the publication. A Grade II* listed building, the Cadw record describes Ty-asch as "extraordinarily unaltered".
