= Grove Farm House, Llanfoist =

Grove Farm House
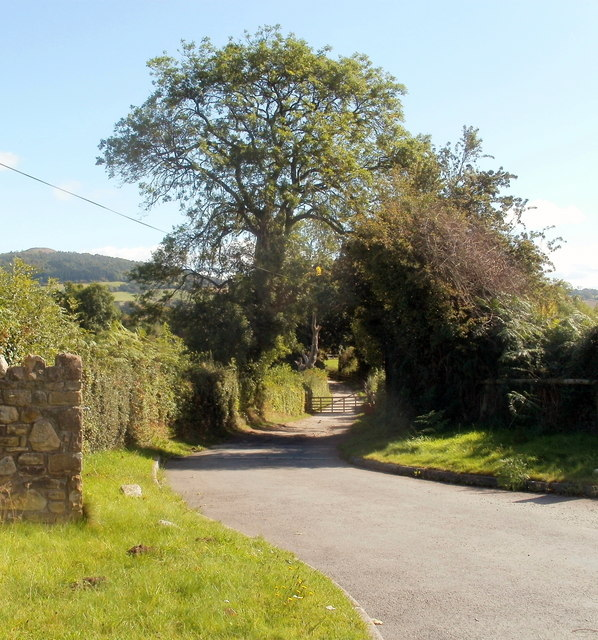
- The drive to Grove Farmhouse, which is not visible from the road

- Location within Monmouthshire
- 51.8091°N 3.0274°W
- Type: House
- Location: Llanfoist

Site notes
- Area: Monmouthshire
- Architectural style: Vernacular
- Governing body: Privately owned

Listed Building – Grade II*
- Official name: Grove Farm House
- Designated: 15 September 1993
- Reference no.: 2898

Grove Farm House, Llanfoist, Monmouthshire is a farmhouse dating from the late 16th century. Reputedly the site of Beili-du, the home of Hywel y Coed, the brother of Dafydd Gam, the house was greatly extended in the 18th century, and further work was undertaken in the 19th. By the late 20th century, the house had fallen into dereliction, prior to its rescue in 1994–95. In the 21st century it has been the site for a number of major planning applications, for housing and for a retirement village. A privately owned property, Grove Farm House is a Grade II* listed building.

== History ==
Historically, the house was the site of the mansion of Beilli-du, the home of Dafydd Gam's brother, Hywel y Coed. In the 18th century, the house was doubled in size, and extensively remodelled internally. By the late 20th century, the house was derelict but was "carefully restored" in 1994–95. In the 21st century, major development proposals have been made for the site, originally for a retirement village, and subsequently for housing.

== Architecture and description ==
Little of the medieval fabric of the farmhouse remains. The architectural historian John Newman dates the earliest part of the building, the east range, to the late 16th century. In the 18th century, major rebuilding took place, to create the present two-storey structure, with slate roofs and stone chimney stacks. The interior contains much mid-18th century decorative work, including a staircase, Neoclassical chimneypieces, and plasterwork. The listing record for the Grade II* listed property notes the "specially complete 18th century interiors".
