= List of scheduled monuments in Anglesey =

Map of the communities of the Isle of Anglesey, Wales

Anglesey includes the largest island in Wales, as well as various nearby smaller islands. Just as Anglesey is joined by bridges to the mainland, so Holy Island is linked to the main island of Anglesey. The 143 scheduled monuments cover over 4,000 years of the history of the islands. Spread throughout the interior and especially the coast of the islands there are 89 prehistoric scheduled sites, including chambered tombs, burial cairns and standing stones, hillforts, hut circles and a henge. Six sites date from the Roman period, and seven from early medieval times. The 18 sites from the medieval post-Norman period include spectacular castles, remote dwellings, and wells, stones and churches. Finally the modern period is mainly agrarian in its purposes, but also includes the copper, coal and brickmaking industries.

Scheduled monuments are found in 34 of the 40 Community areas on the Isle of Anglesey. Clusters are found in Moelfre on the eastern side (14), Trearddur on Holy Island (11), Llanidan overlooking the Menai Strait (10) and Llangoed in the far east (10). One site, Beaumaris Castle, is part of a World Heritage Site and this plus a further 22 of the monuments are in the care of the Welsh heritage agency, Cadw.

Scheduled monuments have statutory protection. The compilation of the list is undertaken by Cadw Welsh Historic Monuments, which is an executive agency of the National Assembly of Wales. The list of scheduled monuments below is supplied by Cadw. with additional material from the Royal Commission on the Ancient and Historical Monuments of Wales and Gwynedd Archaeological Trust.

Recent administrative history

After a spell as part of Gwynedd, the Isle of Anglesey County now covers the same area as the historic county of Anglesey.

== Scheduled monuments in Anglesey ==
The list is sorted by period, and then by community so that sites of similar age and locality are placed near each other. Clicking on one of the heading arrows will sort the list by that information.

Image	Name	Site type	Community	Location	Details	Period	SAM ID (year) Refs
The entrance to Barclodiad y Gawres	Barclodiad y Gawres Burial Chamber	Chambered round barrow	Aberffraw	53.2072°N 4.5036°W, SH329707	Neolithic chambered tomb overlooking Porth Trecastell (Cable Bay). Excavated in 1952–3, it is now consolidated, with lockable iron gates and a concrete domed roof. Several internal stones have Neolithic pecked geometric rock art.	Prehistoric (Neolithic)	AN032
Din Dryfol Burial Chamber	Din Dryfol Burial Chamber	Chambered long cairn	Aberffraw	53.225°N 4.4048°W, SH395724	The burial mound developed over several phases of stone chambers and wooden posts, culminating in a 3 metres (10 ft) high Portal Stone creating a substantial entrance. The mound has now gone, leaving the internal stone structures.	Prehistoric (Neolithic)	AN008
Mynydd Bach round cairn in the foreground, with Barclodiad y Gawres on the skyline	Mynydd Bach round cairn	Round barrow	Aberffraw	53.2085°N 4.5045°W, SH328708	A low, grass covered cairn with a stone burial cist in its centre, on a promontory alongside the more impressive Barclodiad y Gawres (AN032). A fragment of Beaker pottery was found in a 1956 excavation, suggesting a Bronze Age date.	Prehistoric; Bronze Age	AN149
River Ffraw estuary, with round cairn	Trwyn Du round cairn	Round cairn	Aberffraw	53.1824°N 4.4671°W, SH352678	A Bronze Age cairn, excavated in 1956 and 1974, had regular sequence large and small kerbstones, some of which are still visible through the grass. The cairn was found to overlay a much older ground surface, which had a great quantity of flint workings, occupation material and two Tranchet axes dated to 7000BC in the Mesolithic.	Prehistoric (Mesolithic & Bronze Age)	AN148
Y Werthyr, standing Stone near Bryn Llwyd farm	Werthyr standing stone	Standing stone	Amlwch	53.4088°N 4.3856°W, SH415928	Standing Stone 3m high between Y Werthyr and Bryn Llwyd farms. Early writings suggest there was a second upright and a long capstone, of which there is now no sign.	Prehistoric (Bronze Age)	AN150
Dolmen or Burial Chamber, one of two at the site	Presaddfed Burial Chambers	Chambered tomb	Bodedern	53.2992°N 4.4809°W, SH347808	Two megalithic stone features, one a dolmen with huge capstone, the other a collapsed stone burial chambers. A 2m gap is between the two features, and it is thought a single mound would once have covered them both, though this has now disappeared without trace. In the care of Cadw, with public access.	Prehistoric (Neolithic)	AN010
The stone, beside a railway embankement	Malltraeth Yard standing stone	Standing stone	Bodorgan	53.1969°N 4.3838°W, SH408693	Large standing stone, 2.7 metres (8.9 ft) high, beside a railway embankment, north of Malltraeth. It has variously been named Cae Dafydd Maenhir and Trefdraeth Standing Stone. It is a pale igneous rock with many quartz veins.	Prehistoric	AN089
One of the two Standing stones north of Cremlyn	Cremlyn Standing Stones	Standing stone	Cwm Cadnant	53.2759°N 4.1444°W, SH571775	Two standing stones in adjacent fields. The southern one fell over in 1977 and was found to have only 30 cm below ground and 3 metres (10 ft) above, wedged in with packing stones. When replaced, it was concreted in.	Prehistoric	AN074
Hendrefor Burial Chamber	Hendrefor Burial Chambers	Chambered tomb	Cwm Cadnant	53.2729°N 4.1744°W, SH551773	Two stone chambers, 7 metres (23 ft) apart, which would once have been buried under a single long mound. One was recorded as intact in 1802, but by 1825 only one upright remained standing, which remains 2.7 metres (8.9 ft) high. Also called Ucheldref Burial Cairn.	Prehistoric; Neolithic	AN025
	Pen-y-Maen Standing Stone	Standing stone	Cwm Cadnant	53.2427°N 4.1526°W, SH564739	Slender standing stone, 1.65 metres (5.4 ft) high, in a field near Llandegfan. The base has worn down to reveal packing stones.	Prehistoric	AN072
	Ty-Wyn Standing Stone	Standing stone	Cwm Cadnant	53.2428°N 4.1689°W, SH553739	Tapering slab, 3 metres (10 ft) high and 0.8 metres (2.6 ft) wide, on a rise north of Menai Bridge. Also called Plas Cadnant Standing Stone and Ty Gwyn Standing Stone. Large packing stones are visible at the base.	Prehistoric	AN073
Pen Yr Orsedd, southern standing stone	Pen-yr-Orsedd Standing Stones	Standing stone	Cylch-y-Garn	53.384°N 4.5073°W, SH333903	Two large slab standing stones (with reports of a now lost third), 230 metres (250 yd) apart. They are both over 2.7 metres (8.9 ft) high and 1.2 metres (3.9 ft) wide. The name may derive from 'Gorsedd' (meeting place).	Prehistoric	AN081
Ty Mawr Standing Stone	Ty Mawr Standing Stone	Standing stone	Holyhead	53.2967°N 4.6214°W, SH253809	A contorted and irregular stone block with dramatic 'swirls' in the bedding plane. It stands on a prominent site south of Holyhead.	Prehistoric	AN012
Bryn Celli Ddu burial mound	Bryn Celli Ddu Burial Chamber	Burial Chamber	Llanddaniel Fab	53.2077°N 4.2361°W, SH507701	One of the finest passage tombs in Wales, with a mysterious pillar within the burial chamber, a 'Pattern Stone' carved with sinuous serpentine designs, and before all that it was a henge with a stone circle. Excavated and reconstructed in 1928–9. Now in the care of Cadw.	Prehistoric; Neolithic	AN002
	Bryn-Celli-Ddu Standing Stone	Standing stone	Llanddaniel Fab	53.2069°N 4.238°W, SH506701	Low standing stone, wider than it is high. Only the presence of possible packing stones, and a suggested alignment with the nearby Bryn-Celli-Ddu chambered tomb indicate anything other than a natural boulder.	Prehistoric	AN085
Bryn-yr-Hen-Bobl Burial Chamber, south of Plas Newydd	Bryn-yr-Hen-Bobl Burial Chamber	Chambered round cairn	Llanddaniel Fab	53.1972°N 4.2184°W, SH519689	'Hill of the old people' is a substantial mound with a stone chamber. Bones were found here in 1754, and along with Plas Newydd Burial Chambers (AN005) it was included in the first Ancient Monuments Act in 1882. It was excavated by W J Hemp in 1929–35, and Neolithic pottery appeared to lie under and in front of the mound, suggesting a settlement predating its use as a burial site. The chamber was given a doorway following the dig, but is not accessible to the public. It is visible from the southern edge of Plas Newydd Garden Wood.	Prehistoric; Neolithic	AN006
Plas Newydd Burial Chambers, by the corner of the stable block	Plas Newydd Burial Chambers	Chambered tomb	Llanddaniel Fab	53.2038°N 4.2179°W, SH519697	Two adjoining stone chambers of a Neolithic burial cairn form a cromlech on private lawns of Plas Newydd National Trust Country House. The monument, along with nearby Bryn-yr-Hen-Bobl, was one of only three Welsh entries in the initial Schedule of the Ancient Monuments Protection Act 1882	Prehistoric; Neolithic	AN005
Tyddyn-Bach standing stone, surrounded by field clearance boulders.	Tyddyn-Bach Standing Stone	Standing stone	Llanddaniel Fab	53.2089°N 4.2428°W, SH503703	The 3 metres (10 ft) high pointed stone is surrounded by a pile of more recent field clearance boulders. Reportedly the stone is set into a hole or socket in the bedrock. A small tree has become established, growing through the boulders.	Prehistoric	AN084
	Llanddona Standing Stone	Standing stone	Llanddona	53.2946°N 4.1506°W, SH567796	Small (1.7m high) jagged and much weathered upright stone, tapering to a sharp point. It is near Bwlch Farm, west of Llanddona village.	Prehistoric	AN153
	Hirdre-Faig Standing Stone	Standing stone	Llanddyfnan	53.247°N 4.2731°W, SH484746	Large igneous slab, with distinctive quartz veins in a field east of Hirdre-Faig farm. It stands on a shallow ridge in an area known as Penmynydd.	Prehistoric	AN155
Llanddyfan Standing Stone.	Llanddyfnan Standing Stone	Standing stone	Llanddyfnan	53.283°N 4.2492°W, SH501785	Slender pillar, 2.4 metres (7.9 ft) tall near the road to Llanddyfnan church. It had been leaning at an angle of 45° by 1970 and was set upright again some time before 1986. A museum of all things stone-related stands just over the road.	Prehistoric	AN071
Maenaddwyn standing stone	Maen Addwyn	Standing stone	Llanddyfnan	53.3247°N 4.3129°W, SH460833	Ivy-covered 3m high stone beside a road. It was formerly known as Maen Fabli, whilst another stone, which stood 500m to the north, was called Maenaddwyn, and gave its name to the crossroads at which it stood.	Prehistoric	AN069
TyNewydd	Tŷ Newydd Burial Chamber	Chambered tomb	Llanfaelog	53.2359°N 4.4824°W, SH344738	A huge capstone resting on three uprights formed a spectacular monument, described in 1865 as "one of the gems of the Anglesey Cromlechs". It was excavated in 1936 and a Beaker fragment indicated the Neolithic tomb was re-used during the Bronze Age. The monument is in the care of Cadw, with public access. In recent years, the capstone cracked, since when the whole has been supported by two brick piers.	Prehistoric	AN013
Capel Soar Standing Stone, beside the A5025	Capel Soar Standing Stone	Standing stone	Llanfaethlu	53.347°N 4.5264°W, SH319863	Large and prominent standing stone beside the A5025 and close to a Baptist Chapel on an exposed part of north-west Anglesey. It is a slab, 3.2 metres (10 ft) high, and 1.7 metres (5.6 ft) wide at its base, tapering to a rounded top.	Prehistoric	AN083
The Llanfair P. G. Burial Chamber	Ty Mawr Burial Chamber	Chambered tomb	Llanfair Pwllgwyngyll	53.2262°N 4.1902°W, SH538721	This Burial Chamber on the eastern edge of Llanfair PG, (described on the schedule as 180m NE of Pen-y-Berth), has a large capstone now resting on its collapsed support stones. It was a simple passage grave, suggesting an earlier date than most of the Anglesey neolithic tombs.	Prehistoric (Neolithic)	AN037
	Benllech Megalith: Goosehouse	Unclassified site	Llanfair-Mathafarn-Eithaf	53.3202°N 4.2247°W, SH519826	During sewer works in 1965 what was thought to be a small stone burial chamber was found in what is now an area of housing in Benllech. No ancient remains were found, and the presence of a medicine bottle suggested a more modern date. This left the question of what it might be. A stone goose-pen, corn drier, or a folly have all been suggested but are by no means convincing. In the absence of an explanation it retains its listed status.	Prehistoric (probably not)	AN094
Glyn Burial Chamber	Glyn Burial Chamber, Benllech	Burial Chamber	Llanfair-Mathafarn-Eithaf	53.3116°N 4.2317°W, SH514817	Limestone capstone, which appears to be a piece of the local bedrock, levered up and propped in place by other stones. The rise in ground around it may represent a 14m circular mound or cairn that originally covered it. Partial excavation by E.N. Baynes in 1909 found that 'treasure seekers had cleaned out the whole of the chamber'.	Prehistoric (Neolithic)	AN154
Pant-y-Saer Burial Chamber	Pant-y-Saer Burial Chamber	Chambered tomb	Llanfair-Mathafarn-Eithaf	53.3175°N 4.2397°W, SH509824	Two large upright stones support a large capstone, which now leans at a steep angle. It was 'plundered' in 1874 when a visitor dreamed of a crock of gold, but found only bones. A full excavation by Lindsay Scott in 1933 found late Neolithic and early Bronze Age burials of 54 individuals. The base of the chamber was cut into the bedrock, and the whole was covered by a mound with stone edging.	Prehistoric	AN004
Henblas Burial Chamber	Henblas Burial Chamber	Chambered tomb	Llangristiolus	53.2214°N 4.3594°W, SH425719	Three enormous boulders: two blocky and fairly upright, the other a vast slab. They are thought to be glacial erratics which have not travelled far. Striation details suggest some manoeuvering has taken place, and therefore they were probably adapted to create a huge burial tomb. Unverified 19th century reports claimed to have found an urn containing ashes and a ring of blue glass.	Prehistoric	AN003
Bodowyr burial chamber	Bodowyr Burial Chamber	Chambered tomb	Llanidan	53.1882°N 4.3029°W, SH462681	Five surviving uprights formed the walls of a small stone chamber. Three of these now support a large mushroom shaped capstone, with one stone not reaching the capstone, and one fallen down. The whole, although never excavated, has been consolidated and fenced for protection from livestock and to facilitate public access.It is under the guardianship of Cadw, and commands spectacular vies of Snowdonia.	Prehistoric (Neolithic)	AN007
Two large stones, remnant of a stone circle	Bryn Gwyn stones	Stone Circle	Llanidan	53.1772°N 4.3022°W, SH462669	Two huge standing stones on a field boundary and path east of Brynsiencyn. The taller is 4.2 metres (14 ft) high, the tallest on Anglesey. Excavations in 2010 confirmed there were once 8 stones, forming a 16m wide circle, with a further stone inside the circle, perhaps aligning with the nearby henge at Castell Bryn Gwyn (AN015).	Prehistoric (Neolithic)	AN022
The Perthi-Duon Cromlech, Brynsiencyn	Perthi-Duon Burial Chamber	Chambered tomb	Llanidan	53.1761°N 4.276°W, SH479667	Massive stone long-identified as a possible burial chamber capstone, in a field west of Brynsiencyn. Doubts have been expressed on whether it was used in such a way, or is simply a glacial erratic. However, the site was excavated by the WRAO team in 2012 and the results clearly showed it was a Neolithic stone chambered monument (as shown by Rowlands in 1823). Several of the original uprights were incorporated into a nearby field boundary. The excavation also yielded flint and a curious piece of [stratified] copper.	Prehistoric	AN059
Trefwri western standing stone. Another stone, 200m to the east is the one I should have photographed	Trefwri Standing Stone	Standing stone	Llanidan	53.1853°N 4.282°W, SH476677	There are two standing stones at the eastern end of the prehistoric settlement of Trefwri (see also the Pont-sarn hut circles AN087). The smaller stone, (in photo), is less convincing as an ancient stone than the larger one 200m to the east.	Prehistoric	AN086
Llech Golman Standing Stone, near Ynys Fawr	Llech Golman	Standing stone	Llannerch-y-medd	53.3222°N 4.3257°W, SH451831	large blocky standing stone on an undulating ridge. It is 2.4 metres (7.9 ft) high, with packing stones exposed around the base.	Prehistoric	AN070
Bodewryd Standing Stone	Bodewryd Standing Stone	Standing stone	Mechell	53.3847°N 4.3978°W, SH406902	At some 4m high this stone slab is one of the tallest standing stones on Anglesey.	Prehistoric	AN078
The Baron Hill Maen Hir	Baron Hill Maen Hir	Standing stone	Mechell	53.3963°N 4.4531°W, SH369916	A large standing stone 410m North of St Mechell's Church, Llanfechell. During re-seating of the stone in 2010, it was found that one of the packing stones had prehistoric patterned carvings.	Prehistoric	AN080
Standing Stones of the Llanfechell Triangle	Llanfechell Triangle Standing Stones	Standing stone	Mechell	53.3966°N 4.462°W, SH363916	Three Bronze Age Standing Stones, each some 2m high, at the top of a low ridge.	Prehistoric	AN030
Lligwy Burial Chamber	Lligwy Burial Chamber	Chambered tomb	Moelfre	53.3499°N 4.2529°W, SH501860	Huge capstone supported by 8 side stones, all of locally occurring limestone. Described in 1781, excavated in 1909, it contained numerous Neolithic flints and pots, along with 15-30 human burials. Possible East, West and South alignment of stones suggest astronomical purposes	Prehistoric (Neolithic)	AN009
	Ogof Arian Cave	Cave	Moelfre	53.3686°N 4.2781°W, SH485881	Cave with an inner chamber that runs some 25m into the hillside. Neolithic flint tools have been found. Know locally as Ogof Ladran (smugglers cave).	Prehistoric (Neolithic)	AN106
	Plas Bodafon Standing Stone	Standing stone	Moelfre	53.3444°N 4.2907°W, SH476855	In woodland west of Plas Bodafaon, the stone is 1.3m high, of an unusual quartzite.	Prehistoric	AN151
The petrified remains of the Llandyfrydog Bible Thief	Carreg Leidr	Standing stone	Rhosybol	53.3329°N 4.3348°W, SH446843	Upright stone, with an unusual bulbous top. This gave rise to a legend that a thief who had stolen books from the nearby Llandyfrydog Church was turned to stone. The name means 'Thief Stone'.	Prehistoric	AN067
	Llys Einion Standing Stone	Standing stone	Rhosybol	53.3458°N 4.3599°W, SH429858	small, regular stone in a field south of Rhosybol village. Two vertical grooves on the north side could have been caused by lightning strikes.	Prehistoric	AN077
	Maen Chwyf	Chambered tomb	Rhosybol	53.3454°N 4.356°W, SH432857	What some have identified as a large capstone propped up on supporting stones, others suggest is a natural boulder, indistinguishable from other local geology.In the absence of excavation doubts persist on both sides.	Prehistoric	AN076
Penrhos Feilw standing stones	Penrhos Feilw Standing Stones	Standing stone	Trearddur	53.2957°N 4.6618°W, SH227809	Two tall standing stones, 3 metres (10 ft) high and a similar distance apart. The 1860s had recorded suggestions of a cist burial and a stone circle, but neither is in evidence. They area also known as the Plas Meilw standing stones.	Prehistoric	AN017
Trefignath Burial Chamber	Trefignath	Chambered round barrow	Trearddur	53.2932°N 4.6142°W, SH258805	Neolithic tomb, expanded over three periods, each building a new chamber to the east of the previous, retaining the original alignment. It was noted in 1655, with 18th century plundering of the cairn and capstones, and reported finds of urns and bones. The most recent chamber, in use until 2250 BC, retains an elaborate entrance with tall upright portal stones. Full excavation in 1977-9 by Christopher Smith was followed by consolidation and good public access.	Prehistoric (Neolithic)	AN011
	Glan-Alaw Standing Stone	Standing stone	Tref Alaw	53.3433°N 4.4524°W, SH368857	Large slab of stone, 2.6 metres (8.5 ft) high and almost as wide, but only 0.5 metres (1.6 ft) thick, standing in a field between Glan Alaw and Bod-deiniol farms, east of Llyn Alaw.	Prehistoric	AN090
Tregwehelydd Standing Stone	Tregwehelydd Standing Stone	Standing stone	Tref Alaw	53.3195°N 4.4926°W, SH340831	Accessible from a footpath via Tregwehelydd Farm. It is some 8 feet (2.4 m) high, and a more or less even rectangular shap, but it has split along its bedding planes, and is now in three pieces, which were bolted back together in 1969, with large metal straps.	Prehistoric	AN018
	Castellor Hut Group	Unenclosed hut circle	Bryngwran	53.2565°N 4.496°W, SH335761	There were said to be upwards of 26 round huts, with low walls, paved surfaces, and an impressive selection of Iron Age and some Roman finds. Many of these huts were plundered for stone before a survey and excavations in 1871, and 1900, which found quern, coins, and copper ingots. Six hut outlines remain, and the field has been much ploughed. A possible (but doubtful) stone burial chamber has been described on the western side of the scheduled area.	Prehistoric; Iron Age	AN088
	Enclosed Hut Group West of Mariandyrys	Enclosed hut circle	Llanddona	53.3094°N 4.108°W, SH596812	Well preserved survival of a group of round, stone-walled hut sites, with two rectangular huts, all enclosed by a low bank. Provides a good comparison with Din Lligwy, AN023. (also called Llaniestyn Hut Group)	Prehistoric; Iron Age	AN126
	Llanddona Hut Circle	Unenclosed hut circle	Llanddona	53.2937°N 4.1417°W, SH573795	Circular earthworks of a prehistoric roundhouse west of Llanddona. Although the banks are up to 5 metres (16 ft) wide now, they probably represent a collapsed stone wall some 2 metres (7 ft) thick and over a metre high, with perhaps a 10 metres (33 ft) diameter. A conical roof would have stood on this, rising to an impressive 8 metres (26 ft) or more in height, to make a large communal living space. It is listed as 'Hut Circle West of Buarth Cyttir'.	Prehistoric; Iron Age	AN128
	Caerhoslligwy Enclosed Hut Groups	Enclosed hut circle	Llaneugrad	53.3413°N 4.2696°W, SH489851	Two related sites, 200 metres apart, with evidence of Iron Age (or Roman period) hut circles. The more southerly site has a walled enclosure, and at least three buildings. Growth of trees and scrub, along with dumping of quarried material has obscured what detail there was for most of the huts.	Prehistoric (Iron Age)	AN105
	Bwlch Hut Group, Benllech	Enclosed hut circle	Llanfair-Mathafarn-Eithaf	53.3107°N 4.2348°W, SH512816	Variously described as a roundhouse settlement near Coed y Bwlch, Bryn Engan and Coed y Glyn, two hut circles stand on the edge of a strip of woodland southwest of Benllech. Impressive orthostats of 2 metres (7 ft) thick rubble-filled walls suggest huts with an internal diameter of over 9 metres (30 ft). A nearby boundary wall and rectangular building may be an enclosure wall from the same Iron Age or Romano-British period.	Prehistoric (Iron Age)	AN127
	Pant-y-Saer Hut Circles	Enclosed hut circle	Llanfair-Mathafarn-Eithaf	53.3179°N 4.2336°W, SH513824	Stone remains of two roundhouses and two ancillary rectangular buildings, within a drystone walled oval enclosure 38 metres (125 ft) across. The smaller hut has interesting stone platforms around the sides, identified as sleeping places. The site was excavated in 1931 and 1933, with numerous Iron Age and Romano-British finds, plus a 6th-century penannular brooch suggesting a continued occupation into early medieval times.	Prehistoric (Iron Age)	AN043
	Penmon Deer Park Hut Groups & Terraces	Enclosed hut circle	Llangoed	53.3081°N 4.0613°W, SH627810	Several Iron Age enclosure earthworks, each with one or more roundhouses. Part of a wider landscape of Iron Age fields.	Prehistoric (Iron Age)	AN044
Graiglas Barrow, alongside the road to Mona	Graiglas Barrow	Round barrow	Llangristiolus	53.2472°N 4.3765°W, SH415748	Burial mound (also known as Craig Las), 9 metres (30 ft) across and 1.2 metres (3.9 ft) high, beside a minor road, on a low ridge near the Mona industrial estate. A fallen standing stone is close by to the north (not scheduled).	Prehistoric (Bronze Age)	AN112
Gwna valley near the hut group	Tyddyn Sadler Hut Group	Enclosed hut circle	Llangristiolus	53.2367°N 4.3822°W, SH411737	Several square and round huts grouped amongst a network of field systems, and probably dating to Iron Age or Roman period. The wider area was noted in 1871 for its hut circles and embankments, but this particular group was first identified and documented in 1977.	Prehistoric	AN122
View southwards along the Castell Bryn Gwyn earthworks	Castell Bryn Gwyn	Henge & enclosure	Llanidan	53.1784°N 4.2979°W, SH465670	Revetted stone walls surround a level area some 54 metres in diameter. An earlier bank and ditch belong to a henge from the end of the Neolithic period. During the Iron Age the present wall was built, and it was refortified in Roman times and later.	Prehistoric	AN015
Pont Sarn-Las Hut Group, Brynsiencyn, Anglesey	Pont Sarn-Las Hut Group	Unenclosed hut circle	Llanidan	53.1859°N 4.2891°W, SH471678	Circles in the field, with evidence of surviving stonework. Roman coins and other finds were reported in the 18th and 19th centuries, along with the suggestion that it was part of a large pre-Roman settlement of Trefwri, perhaps extending to Caer Leb (AN014) 500m to the south.	Prehistoric	AN087
Barrow east of Brynsiencyn	Brynsiencyn Round Barrow	Round barrow	Llanidan	53.1783°N 4.2637°W, SH488669	Large unexcavated round barrow on a gentle slope, east of Brynsiencyn. Also known as 'Round barrow west of Carn or Garn'.	Prehistoric (Bronze Age)	AN060
	Cors-y-Bol Round Barrow	Round barrow	Llannerch-y-medd	53.331°N 4.4414°W, SH375843	Possible ring cairn, barrow, or perhaps enclosure, it was noticed by a farmer in 1956, on the edge of a bog which drains into Llyn Alaw. Also referred to as 'Cor y Bal'.	Prehistoric	AN091
	Llifad, Carreglefn	Enclosure	Mechell	53.3916°N 4.4302°W, SH384910	A later prehistoric pentagonal enclosure, 49 yards (45m) across. It is a possible defended settlement and stands a few hundred metres south of Pen-y-Morwydd Barrow.	Prehistoric	AN079
	Pen-y-Morwyd Round Barrow	Round barrow	Mechell	53.3934°N 4.4306°W, SH384912	Prominent burial mound on a hill-top between Llanfechell and Bodewryd. It is 25 metres (82 ft) across, and 2 metres (7 ft) high, crossed by a modern wall. A footpath from Rhosbeirio crosses the mound.	Prehistoric; Bronze Age	AN110
	Bwlch-y-Dafarn Hut Group	Enclosed hut circle	Moelfre	53.3463°N 4.2654°W, SH492856	Roughly rectangular walled enclosure. Within it a well defined roundhouse, 6m across with paved floor, had Roman pottery finds. There are also two large rectangular buildings.	Prehistoric	AN104
	Glan'r Afon Hut Circle	Unenclosed hut circle	Moelfre	53.3448°N 4.2536°W, SH500854	Hut circle of 8m diameter with rubble-filled 1.3m thick walls, up to 0.8m high. Now in thick woodland, rectangular buildings alongside have also been recorded.	Prehistoric	AN095
Marian-glas Hut Group and Ministry of Works sign	Marian-glas Hut Group	Unenclosed hut circle	Moelfre	53.3379°N 4.2516°W, SH501846	A roundhouse settlement, also called Cae Marh, with several huts with thick walls, some standing up to 1.4m high. Some of the hut walls are now obscured by a thicket, while others are visible as wall lines in the lawns of Marianglas caravan park. A sign by the Ministry of Public Building and Works (1962–70) indicates the location.	Prehistoric	AN093
	Parc Salmon Hut Group	Unenclosed hut circle	Moelfre	53.3509°N 4.2552°W, SH500861	Circular hut and a nearby mound of discarded shellfish, with pottery and other items including half of a bronze ring. The hut had flooring of cobbles set in the earth, and a mortar stone set into the floor.	Prehistoric (Iron Age & Roman)	AN102
Tumulus at Pen-y-fynwent	Pen-y-Fynwent Barrow	Round barrow	Rhosybol	53.374°N 4.3551°W, SH434889	A low burial mound, some 22 metres (72 ft) across and 1m high, and thought to be Bronze Age. It is in the same field as the Medieval Pen-y-Fynwent Enclosure (AN124).	Prehistoric	AN125
	Hut Circle Settlement at Capel Llochwydd	Enclosed hut circle and Chapel site	Trearddur	53.3121°N 4.6812°W, SH214828	Multi-period site, on the cliff top near South Stack on Holy Island. The walls of a ruined medieval chapel are cut into the enclosure walls and hut circles of an Iron Age settlement. The Bronze Age burial mound of Gosgarth Bay round cairn (AN147) is a few yards up the slope. The site was, until the 1770s, the setting for local festival day gatherings, when young people would attempt 'matrimonial divining'	Prehistoric & Medieval	AN133
	Gogarth Bay round cairn	Round cairn	Trearddur	53.3116°N 4.6823°W, SH214827	Round cairn on the summit of a coastal ridge known as Garn, close to the Llochwydd chapel and hut site at AN133. The large low mound of stones is a Bronze Age burial cairn, with dramatic views of the coast and area.	Prehistoric (Bronze Age)	AN147
Holyhead Mountain Hut Circles.	Holyhead Mountain Hut Circles	Hut circle settlement	Trearddur	53.3054°N 4.6838°W, SH212820	This collection of over 20 impressive unenclosed circular stone huts (named as 'Cytiau'r Gwyddelod' on OS maps) at Ty Mawr, near South Stack, has been in the care of the state since 1911. Some 50 hut sites were noted by W O Stanley in 1862, many of which are no longer visible. The site is now within the South Stack Cliffs RSPB reserve. Evidence for occupation from the Mesolithic through to early medieval periods has been found, but the main standing remains are from the Iron Age.	Prehistoric (Iron Age)	AN016
	Plas Meilw Hut Circles	Unenclosed hut circle	Trearddur	53.2956°N 4.6573°W, SH230809	Collection of Iron Age huts, of which two now remain as visible circles. They were excavated in 1868 by William Owen Stanley who identified 12 round huts and two rectangular buildings. A fireplace, stone flooring, quernstones, a variety of hammers, pounders, grinding stones, spindlewhorls, whetstones and pottery were found along with possible evidence of copper smelting. By 2013 the site was overgrown with brambles and gorse.	Prehistoric (Iron Age)	AN033
Cattle grazing within a hut circle above Porth Dafarch	Porth Dafarch Hut Circles	Round barrows and Settlement	Trearddur	53.2882°N 4.6505°W, SH234800	Complex coastal site with two Bronze Age burial mounds overlaid by Romano-British hut circles that had become buried by wind-blown sand. These were investigated by William Owen Stanley in 1878, with further excavations by B. H. St. John O'Neill of the Ministry of Works prior to road-widening in 1939 which then obliterated some of the settlement. The hut group comprised at least two circular huts with low stone walls and a central post-hole, with hearths suggesting several different phases of occupation. A selection of 2nd to 4th century finds included sherds of Samian ware pottery, a glass bead, a later Iron Age bronze tankard handle, a collection of stone objects including spindle whorls and rotary querns, a pennanular brooch and a carnelian intaglio. The finds are now held by National Museum Wales.	Prehistoric (Bronze Age and Romano-British)	AN034
	Tre-Arddur Hut Group	Enclosed hut circle	Trearddur	53.2874°N 4.6079°W, SH262798	Identified in 1959 as a group of three circular hut foundations, the site has not had any excavations. It is now mostly obscured by gorse thickets within the Trearddur Bay Caravan Park. It dates to the 1st century BC and its location on an east-facing knoll overlooking the channel between Holy Island and Anglesey, suggests a link with a similar hut group on the far bank of the channel on the Ynys Leurad peninsula (AN035) in Valley Community, perhaps indicating the two sides of a ferry route.	Prehistoric (Iron Age)	AN092
The site of Bedd Branwen	Bedd Branwen Round Cairn	Round barrow	Tref Alaw	53.3363°N 4.4628°W, SH361849	Bronze Age cairn beside the River Alaw. An excavation of 1813 found a cremation urn, and linked the site to the burial of Branwen. The cairn has a central pillar dated to before 2000BC, and the mound raised around it soon after 1400BC. Up to 12 cremated burial urns have been identified in an excavation of 1966.	Prehistoric (Bronze Age)	AN098
	Ynys Leurad Hut Circles	Hut circle settlement	Valley	53.2799°N 4.5858°W, SH277790		Prehistoric (Iron Age)	AN035
Twyn y Parc headland	Tywyn-y-Parc Promontory Fort	Promontory Fort - coastal	Bodorgan	53.1568°N 4.4414°W, SH368649	The fort is defined by a substantial bank running across the neck of the promentary with a possible gate at the northern edge. 70m long, 8m wide and 2.5m high, it forms a substantial barrier, and has two shorter sections of outer walls which overlap slightly.	Prehistoric	AN049
Site of smallHillfort	Y Werthyr Hillfort	Hillfort	Bryngwran	53.2758°N 4.4391°W, SH374782	Oval earthwork bank, 200m across, crossed through its western edge by the B5112 2 km NW of Gwalchmai in central Anglesey, Wales. Iron Age defensive double banked hillfort on a low hilltop, now quite faint on the ground, but the outline of which is retained in a hedge line west of the road.	Prehistoric (Iron Age)	AN042
Dinas Gynfor Iron Age Fort	Dinas Gynfor Hillfort	Hillfort	Llanbadrig	53.4274°N 4.4236°W, SH390950		Prehistoric	AN038
Southern slopes of Din Sylwy hillfort	Din Sylwy	Hillfort	Llanddona	53.3108°N 4.1229°W, SH586814	Also called Bwrdd Arthur, the earthworks enclose a relatively flat, partly overgrown area, 600 yards from the Irish Sea. Two entrances have been detected.	Prehistoric	AN024
	Castell near Tre-Fadog	Promontory Fort - coastal	Llanfaethlu	53.3423°N 4.5686°W, SH290858		Prehistoric	AN082
	Caer Idris Hillfort	Hillfort	Llanidan	53.1874°N 4.2546°W, SH494679		Prehistoric	AN051
	Dinas Cadnant Hillfort	Hillfort	Menai Bridge	53.2377°N 4.1712°W, SH551733		Prehistoric	AN048
	Coed Newydd Boiling Mounds & Smelting Hearth	Burnt mound	Moelfre	53.3475°N 4.2715°W, SH488858		Prehistoric	AN103
Part of the Din Lligwy hut group	Din Lligwy Hut Group	Enclosed hut circle	Moelfre	53.3508°N 4.2592°W, SH497861	Stone foundation walls of a group of Iron Age houses and workshops, surrounded by an enclosing wall.	Prehistoric	AN023
Main gateway of Caer y Twr Iron Age fort	Caer y Tŵr	Hillfort	Trearddur	53.3131°N 4.6747°W, SH219829	A Roman-era hillfort on the summit of the Holyhead Mountain. Now mostly rubble, but its walls can still be made out, including a large stone rampart on the north and east sides.	Prehistoric	AN019
	Dinas Porth Ruffydd	Hillfort	Trearddur	53.2819°N 4.6673°W, SH222794		Prehistoric	AN121
	Y Werthyr Hillfort	Hillfort	Tref Alaw	53.3303°N 4.4594°W, SH363843	Bivallate hillfort on an imposing hill top. Ramparts are now mostly ploughed out.	Prehistoric	AN158.
	Capel Eithin (site of) and Cemetery	Chapel	Llanfihangel Ysgeifiog	53.2293°N 4.2634°W, SH490726		Prehistoric	AN120
	Bryn Eryr Rectangular Earthwork	Enclosure	Cwm Cadnant	53.2578°N 4.1892°W, SH540756		Roman	AN100
	Hendrefor Earthwork	Enclosure	Cwm Cadnant	53.2655°N 4.1825°W, SH545765		Roman	AN075
Caer Gybi Roman Wall with St Cybi's Church	Caer Gybi Roman Fortlet	Fort	Holyhead	53.3116°N 4.632°W, SH247826	Small fortlet at the centre of Holyhead. Possibly a late-4th-century outpost for Segontium, to defend Anglesey from Irish sea-raiders	Roman	AN031
South-western rampart of Parcia hillfort	Parciau hill fort	Hillfort	Llaneugrad	53.3374°N 4.2627°W, SH494846		Roman	AN041
Caer Lêb earthworks	Caer Lêb	Enclosure	Llanidan	53.1819°N 4.2866°W, SH472674		Roman	AN014
	Bodafon Mountain Hut Groups	Enclosed hut circle	Moelfre	53.3394°N 4.2983°W, SH470849		Roman	AN040
	Pen-Sieri Inscribed Stone	Inscribed stone	Aberffraw	53.2069°N 4.4951°W, SH334706	Early Christian memorial stones with the words 'MAILIS' ("of Mail")], plus some Ogham text, suggesting 5th or 6th century date. In 1802 it was in use as a barn lintel. In 2002 it was relocated inside a farm building at Trecastell Farm.	Early Medieval	AN058
	Bodedern Early Christian Cemetery	Cemetery	Bodedern	53.2906°N 4.4898°W, SH341799		Early Medieval	AN099
Standing Stone beside the A4080	Bodfeddan Inscribed Stone	Inscribed stone	Llanfaelog	53.2429°N 4.465°W, SH356745	Standing Stone 2m high, alongside the A4080 1 km north of Pencarnisiog. Inscribed on Northern face is the text CVNOGVS_HIC IACIT ("Cunogus(s)us lies here"). The text is dated to the 5th or 6th century AD, but a well-defined cup mark may indicate the stone is a prehistoric item.	Early Medieval	AN021
	Penmon Cross	Cross	Llangoed	53.3058°N 4.0568°W, SH630807		Early Medieval	AN063
St Seiriol's Well, Penmon Priory	St Seiriol's Well, Penmon	Holy Well	Llangoed	53.3064°N 4.0566°W, SH630808		Early Medieval	AN062
Eastern end of Ynys Seiriol - Puffin Island with monastic ruins	Monastic Settlement on Puffin Island	Monastic settlement	Llangoed	53.3193°N 4.0253°W, SH651821		Early Medieval	AN064
Mound on Malltraeth marsh, by local tradition the site of a chapel	Mynwent y Llwyn	Chapel?	Llangristiolus	53.2325°N 4.31°W, SH459730	Broad mound on Malltraeth marsh, beside the old A5. It has long been suggested, and doubted, as the site of a chapel, however a resistivity survey in 1970 found the foundations of a rectangular building. The name means 'the burial ground of the grove'	Early Medieval?	AN065
:Inscribed stones at Llangaffo Church	Llangaffo inscribed stones	Cross shaft	Rhosyr	53.1911°N 4.3277°W, SH445685	In the churchyard of St Caffo's Church, Llangaffo, there is a part of a 9th-century stone cross, and inscribed gravestones from the 9th to 11th centuries	Early Medieval	AN053
Beaumaris Castle	Beaumaris Castle	Castle	Beaumaris	53.2649°N 4.0897°W, SH607762	One of the most famous castles of Edward I. Part of the Castles and Town Walls of Gwynedd World Heritage site	Medieval	AN001 (1925)
	Beaumaris Town Wall	Town Wall	Beaumaris	53.2647°N 4.0941°W, SH604762		Medieval	AN123
	Llanfaes Friary	Friary	Beaumaris	53.2746°N 4.0871°W, SH609773		Medieval	AN134
Hafoty Old Farm House	Hafoty Medieval House	House (domestic)	Cwm Cadnant	53.2809°N 4.1579°W, SH562781		Medieval	AN097
	Castell Crwn	Ringwork	Cylch-y-Garn	53.3879°N 4.5098°W, SH331908		Medieval	AN029
Derelict church near Gaerwen	St Michael's Church, Llanfihangel Ysgeifiog	Church	Llanfihangel Ysgeifiog	53.236°N 4.2809°W, SH478734		Medieval	AN052
	Plas Berw	House (domestic)	Llanfihangel Ysgeifiog	53.2206°N 4.2993°W, SH465717		Medieval	AN057
	Tre-Garnedd Moated Site	Moated Site	Llangefni	53.2466°N 4.2964°W, SH468746		Medieval	AN047
	Aberlleiniog Castle	Motte	Llangoed	53.2926°N 4.0772°W, SH616793	Civil War stone fortifications on a medieval motte	Medieval	AN020
Penmon Priory from the east	Penmon Priory	Priory	Llangoed	53.3055°N 4.0568°W, SH630807	Early medieval religious foundation that was an Augustinian Priory by 1237	Medieval	AN027
Archways alongside old church, Llanidan	Old Church of St Nidan, Llanidan	Church	Llanidan	53.1779°N 4.2535°W, SH494669		Medieval	AN054
Old Lligwy Chapel	Capel Lligwy	Chapel	Moelfre	53.3523°N 4.2564°W, SH499863	12th century ruined chapel with a 16th-century side chapel with a vault beneath. At some point it became a private place of worship for a nearby house, then later fell into disrepair and now has no roof, but stands as a picturesque ruin.	Medieval	AN056
	Ffynnon Allgo (St Allgo's Well)	Holy Well	Moelfre	53.3385°N 4.2559°W, SH498847		Medieval	AN068
Fish trap built near the low-tide mark of Lligwy Bay.	Traeth Lligwy Fish Weir	Fish weir	Moelfre	53.3606°N 4.2555°W, SH500872	Fish trap built as a crescent of rocks near the low-tide mark of Lligwy Bay, near Moelfre, Anglesey. It is of uncertain date, is covered at high-tide, and was used to trap fish in the pond it creates at low-tide.	Medieval	AN144
Remains of well building	St Gwenfaen's Well	Holy Well	Rhoscolyn	53.2473°N 4.6101°W, SH259754	An early medieval holy well in the south west of Holy Island, named after St Gwenfaen, whose cloister was nearby. Also known as Welsh: Ffynnon Gwenfaen.	Medieval	AN055
	Pen-y-Fynwent Enclosure	Enclosure	Rhosybol	53.3732°N 4.356°W, SH433888	Medieval or pre-medieval homestead enclosure, and suggested site of a chapel. The enclosure survives as a low bank. No trace now remains of the chapel, which 19th century sources named variously as Bettws Bwchwdw, Capel Tegeryn, and a Church dedicated to St Morwenna. A Bronze Age Mound (AN125) is in the same field.	Medieval	AN124
View across the excavated foundations of the Great Hall and adjoining rooms at Rhosyr	Llys Rhosyr	Manor	Rhosyr	53.162°N 4.3661°W, SH419653	Thirteenth century llys, a court of the princes of Gwynedd, excavated in 1993. It went out of use during the 14th century when the nearby 'new borough' was founded, and the llys was buried by the dunes.	Medieval (13th century)	AN129
The Ruined Church, Lighthouse and Main Cross on Llanddwyn	St Dwynwen's Church	Church	Rhosyr	53.1373°N 4.4132°W, SH387627		Medieval	AN046
18th century bridge over the Afon Ffraw.	Pont Aberffraw	Bridge	Aberffraw	53.1921°N 4.4625°W, SH355689	Bridge over the Afon Ffraw at Aberffraw, built by Sir A. Owen in 1731. A walled causeway continues to the east over the large expanse of sand dunes of Tywyn Aberffraw. The bridge is now only open to pedestrians.	Post-Medieval /Modern	AN101
Parys Mountain opencast workings	Parys Mountain	Tower	Amlwch	53.3865°N 4.3448°W, SH441903	Windmill, Engine House, Precipitation Pits and Great Opencast	Post-Medieval /Modern	AN111
	Gorad Friars Bach Fish Weir	Fish weir	Beaumaris	53.2781°N 4.0787°W, SH615777		Post-Medieval /Modern	AN140
Red Wharf Bay with fish weir in the distance	Llanddona Fish Weir	Fish weir	Llanddona	53.3081°N 4.1439°W, SH572812	A post medieval intertidal fish trap at the eastern end of the beach at Red Wharf Bay near Llanddona.	Post-Medieval /Modern	AN137
	Parciau Dovecot	Dovecote	Llaneugrad	53.3309°N 4.2576°W, SH497839		Post-Medieval /Modern	AN036
	Coed Mor Fish Weir	Fish weir	Llanfair Pwllgwyngyll	53.2188°N 4.1841°W, SH542713		Post-Medieval /Modern	AN138
	Gorad Ddu Fish Weir	Fish weir	Llanfair Pwllgwyngyll	53.2214°N 4.1797°W, SH545715		Post-Medieval /Modern	AN139
	North Weir and Smoke Tower, Ynys Gorad Goch	Fish weir	Llanfair Pwllgwyngyll	53.2187°N 4.1813°W, SH544712		Post-Medieval /Modern	AN096
	Felin Carnau Tide Mill	Tidemill	Llanfair-yn-Neubwll	53.2541°N 4.5514°W, SH298760		Post-Medieval /Modern	AN131
	Felin Wen Tide Mill	Tidemill	Llanfair-yn-Neubwll	53.2644°N 4.5565°W, SH295772		Post-Medieval /Modern	AN130
	Aberlleiniog Fish Weir I	Fish weir	Llangoed	53.2902°N 4.0672°W, SH625792		Post-Medieval /Modern	AN142
	Aberlleiniog Fish Weir II	Fish weir	Llangoed	53.2911°N 4.0628°W, SH625793		Post-Medieval /Modern	AN143
Penmon Dovecot, alongside the medieval priory	Penmon Dovecote	Dovecote	Llangoed	53.3056°N 4.0557°W, SH631807		Post-Medieval /Modern	AN061
	Trecastell Fish Weir	Fish weir	Llangoed	53.2862°N 4.07°W, SH621786		Post-Medieval /Modern	AN141
	Bodafon Mountain Early Medieval Homestead	Settlement	Moelfre	53.3369°N 4.2976°W, SH471846		Post-Medieval /Modern	AN039
	Bodior Tide Mill	Tidemill	Rhoscolyn	53.2605°N 4.5685°W, SH287767		Post-Medieval /Modern	AN132
	Hendai Medieval Farmstead	Farmstead	Rhosyr	53.1469°N 4.3864°W, SH404637		Post-Medieval /Modern	AN108
	Newlands Fish Weir	Fish weir	Valley	53.2955°N 4.5646°W, SH290807		Post-Medieval /Modern	AN145
	Dyffryn Adda Copper Furnace and Precipitation Ponds	Copper mine	Amlwch	53.396°N 4.3506°W, SH438913		Post-Medieval /Modern	AN135
View eastwards across the precipitation ponds at Mona Mine	Mona Mine	Copper mine	Amlwch	53.3872°N 4.3375°W, SH446903	Kilns and Sublimation Chambers at Mona Mine, Mynydd Parys	Post-Medieval /Modern	AN136
Kilns and chimneys at Porth Wen brickworks	Porth Wen Brickworks	Brickworks	Llanbadrig	53.424°N 4.4065°W, SH401946	A now disused Victorian brickworks which produced fire bricks. The substantial remains include a number of buildings and the remains of some of the machinery.	Post-Medieval /Modern	AN109
Stone-built quay from 1823 as part of Thomas Telford's embankment linking Holyhead to London	Quay on the Stanley Embankment	Quay	Valley	53.289°N 4.5789°W, SH281999	The Quay is the best preserved element of Thomas Telford's Stanley Embankment, the causeway between Holyhead and Anglesey. It was built in 1823 as the final link in the London to Holyhead Road. The angles of the masonry walls allowed ships to moor alongside the large unloading area. The main change in the original design is the addition of a higher parapet.	Post-Medieval /Modern	AN146
The Berw Colliery site	Berw Colliery	Colliery	Llanfihangel Ysgeifiog	53.2269°N 4.3031°W, SH463724		Post-Medieval /Modern	AN152

Scheduled monuments in Isle of Anglesey, Wales.
=Prehistoric =Roman =Early Medieval
=Medieval =Post-Medieval/Modern

== See also ==
- List of Cadw properties
- List of castles in Wales
- List of hill forts in Wales
- Historic houses in Wales
- List of monastic houses in Wales
- List of museums in Wales
- List of Roman villas in Wales
