= Llwyn-y-gaer House, Tregare =

Llwyn-y-gaer House
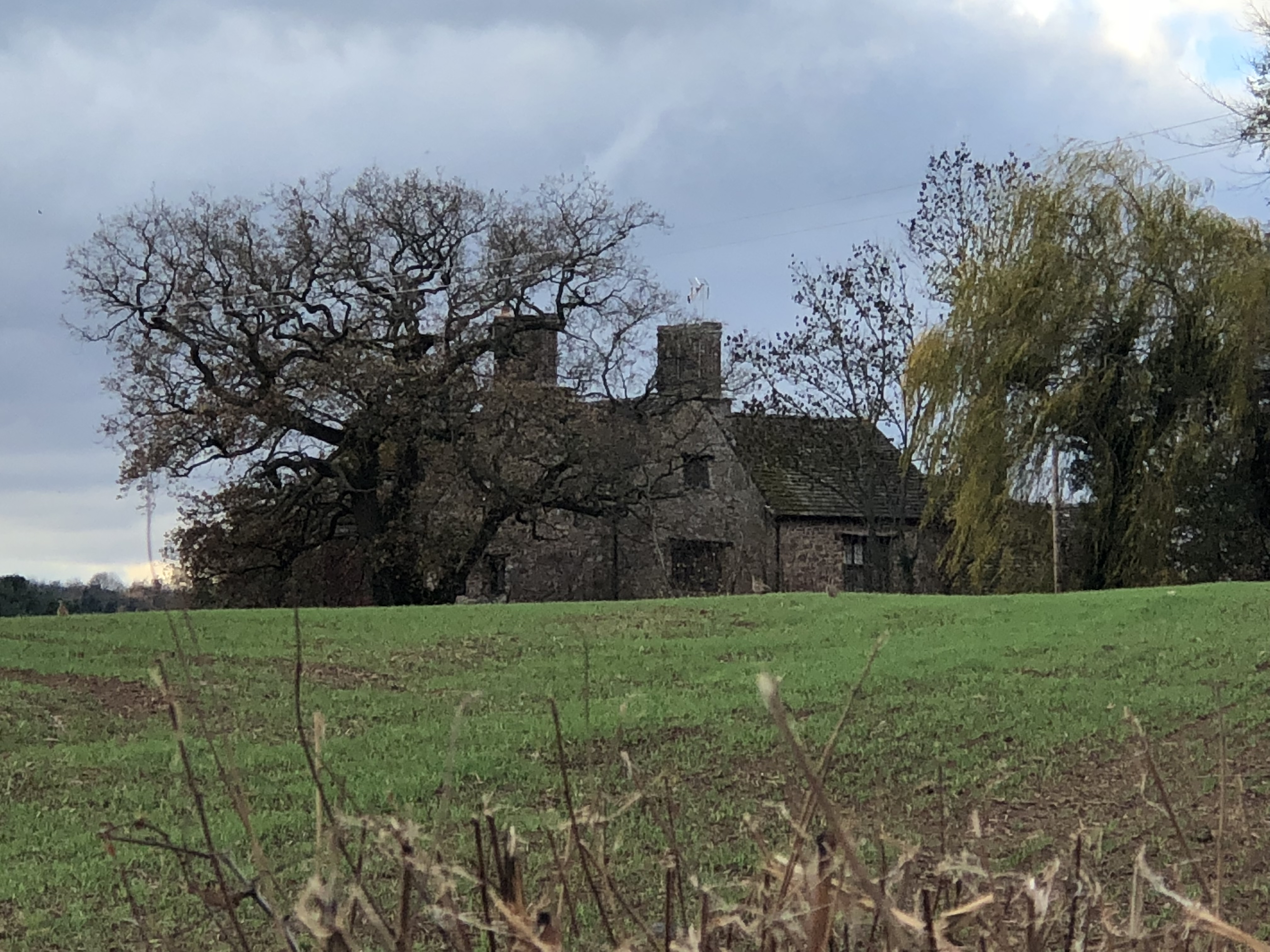
- "one of the largest and finest Monmouthshire farmhouses"

- Location within Monmouthshire
- 51.7955°N 2.8647°W
- Type: House
- Location: Tregare, Monmouthshire

History
- Built: mid 17th century

Site notes
- Architectural style: Vernacular
- Governing body: Privately owned

Listed Building – Grade II*
- Official name: Llwyn-y-gaer House
- Designated: 1 May 1952
- Reference no.: 2062

Llwyn-y-gaer House, Tregare, Monmouthshire is a farmhouse dating from the mid 17th century, although with earlier origins. Described by John Newman as "one of the largest and finest Monmouthshire farmhouses of its period", the house is Grade II* listed.

== History ==
The origins of the house are medieval, evidenced by its moated site, but nothing remains of the medieval structure. The name translates as "grove of the fortress". The present building dates from two periods, of around 1630 and 1670. Sir Cyril Fox and Lord Raglan, in the third of their three-volume study, Monmouthshire Houses, describe Llwyn-y-gaer as "important" and include a photograph of an ovolo mullioned window. The house was modernised in 1944 but reduced in size, including the removal of the porch, in further renovations in the 1950s. It remains privately owned.

== Architecture and description ==
The house is of two storeys and is constructed of Old Red Sandstone rubble. It is built to an L-plan. The interior has rooms with "impressive" period decoration, particularly the plaster ceilings and fire mantels. Cadw notes the similarity between the plasterwork and that found at The Artha, Tregare. Llwyn-y-gaer is a Grade II* listed structure.
