= Tŷ Mawr =

Tŷ Mawr (sometimes Ty Mawr) means "big house" in Welsh and may refer to the following historical houses or areas in Wales:

- Tŷ Mawr, Castle Caereinion in Powys
- Tŷ Mawr, Dingestow in Monmouthshire
- Tŷ Mawr Wybrnant, a National Trust property in Conwy County Borough
- Caeau Ty-mawr, a Site of Special Scientific Interest in Brecknock, Powys
- Holyhead Mountain Hut Circles (Welsh: Cytiau Tŷ Mawr), a group of prehistoric dwellings on Holy Island, Anglesey
- Ty Mawr Burial Chamber, a dolmen in Anglesey, Wales
- Tŷ Mawr, Wrexham, a country park in Wrexham County Borough
- Ty Mawr Reservoir, a reservoir in Wrexham County Borough
