= Llanddona fish weir =

- Gorad Llanddona
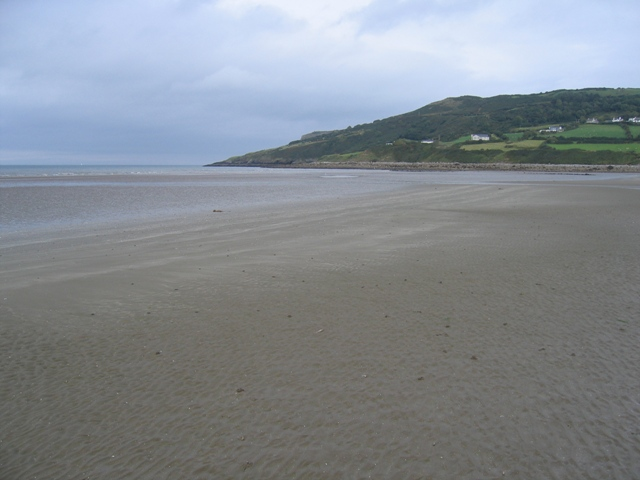
- Red Wharf Bay with fish weir in the distance

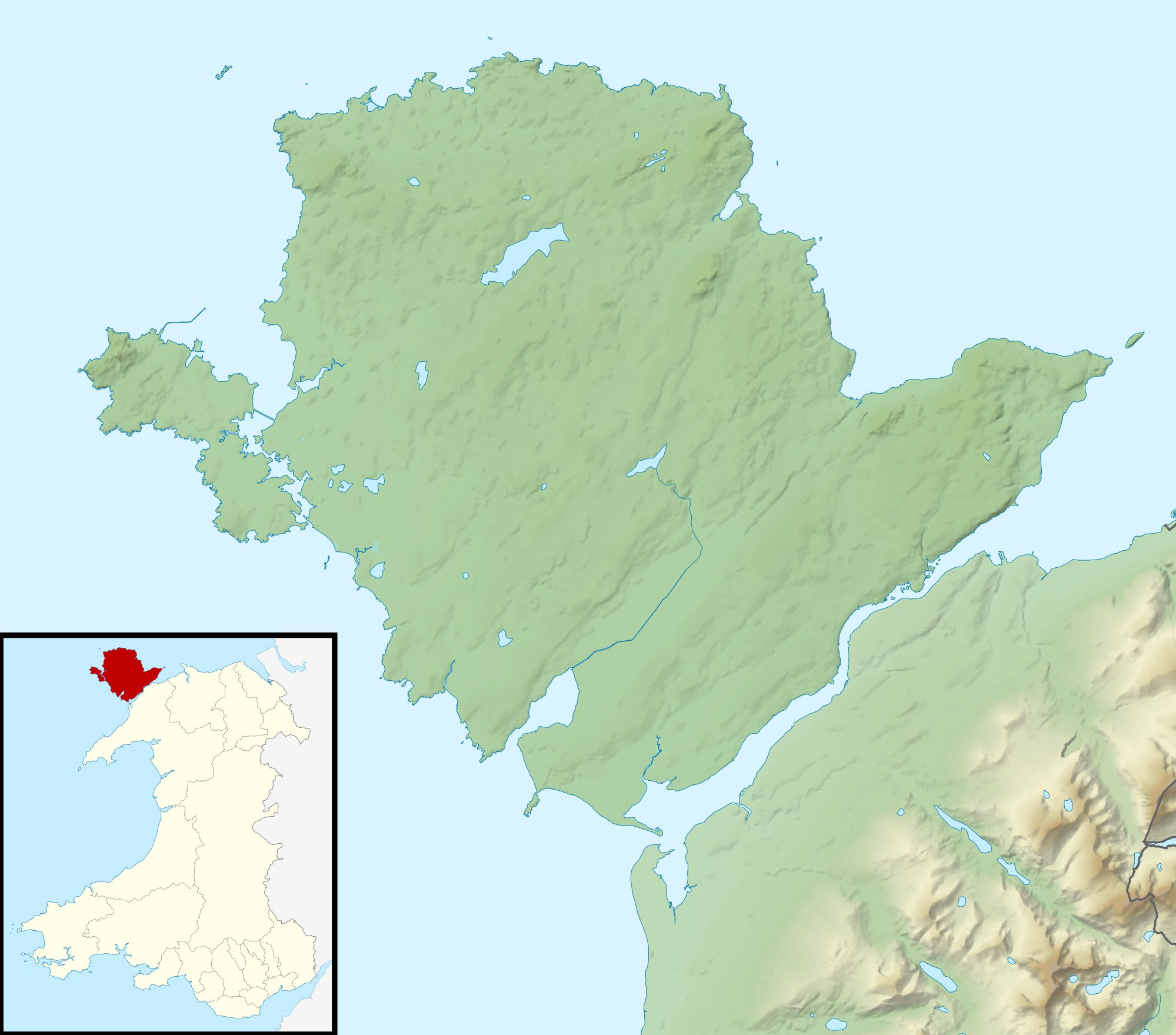
- Location in Anglesey
- 53.308°N 4.144°W
- Type: fish weir
- Location: Anglesey, Wales
- OS grid reference: SH 5725 8116

Scheduled monument
- Official name: Llanddona Fish Weir
- Designated: 31 October 2002
- Reference no.: AN137

Llanddona fish weir (also known as Welsh: Gorad Llanddona or Welsh: Gorad Fona) is a post-medieval fish trap sited in Llanddona, on the Isle of Anglesey. The fish weir is a scheduled monument.

== Location ==
Llanddona fish weir is at the far eastern end of the beach at Red Wharf Bay where a band of rocks turns to sand, and is near the estuary of the brook that passes near St Dona's church. The fish weir lies at the edge of the Penmon Historic Landscape Area.

== Description ==
Llanddona fish weir is a V-shaped trap, typically used when trapping fish in tidal waters. The two arms of the V run down the beach, starting below the high-water line and almost meet at the tip of the V just above the low-water line, where the fish are caught in a net or a trap when the tide recedes. The sides of the V-shaped trap can be made of stone, wattle fencing, or both.

At Llanddona the sea is north of the beach, so the western arm, about 300m long, points north-east, and the eastern arm, about 100m long, starts at the edge of the beach and points north-west.

== History ==
Llanddona fish weir is first mentioned in the 17th century in the records of the Baron Hill estate and is also shown on a chart of 1748 by Lewis Morris, a hydrographer, surveyor and author from Anglesey.

Near the weir there are two buildings named as Godreddi Bach and Godreddi Mawr. The names seem to be a corruption of Goreddi (the plural of gored, meaning weir). This possibly associates the buildings with the weir, and that there may have been more than one weir. Additionally, a double line of stones has been identified on an aerial photograph which may be part of the original construction or part of later rebuilding.

== Recent history ==
Llanddona fish weir was designated as a scheduled monument in 2002 as being of national importance to improve understanding of medieval or post-medieval maritime agricultural practices and possibly containing archaeological information concerning chronology and building techniques.

== Access ==
Llanddona fish weir, like most of the beach at Red Wharf Bay, is covered by the sea at high tide, and even at low tide the apex of the weir is still underwater. The Llanddona circular walk passes near the site of the weir.

== See also ==
- List of Scheduled Monuments in Anglesey
- Menai Strait fish weirs
