= Tŷ Mawr, Dingestow =

Historic farm buildings in Monmouthshire, Wales

Tŷ Mawr
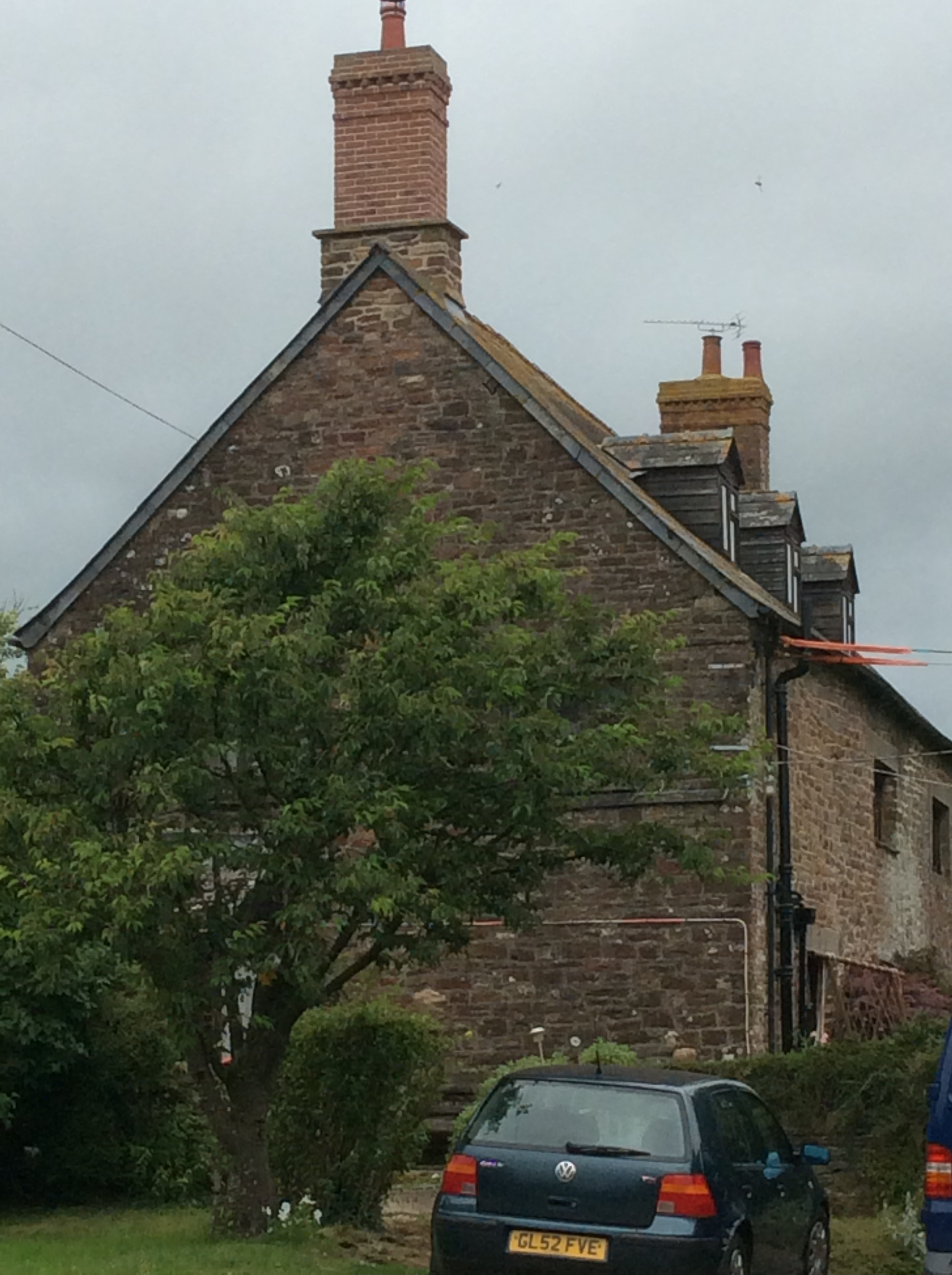

- Location within Monmouthshire
- 51.7854°N 2.8166°W
- Type: Farm
- Location: Dingestow, Monmouthshire

History
- Built: 1640

Site notes
- Architectural style: Vernacular
- Governing body: Privately owned

Listed Building – Grade II*
- Official name: Ty Mawr, with attached outbuilding
- Designated: 19 November 1953
- Reference no.: 2092

Listed Building – Grade II*
- Official name: Gatehouse to Ty Mawr
- Designated: 19 November 1953
- Reference no.: 2093

Tŷ Mawr in Dingestow, Monmouthshire, is a complex of farm buildings dating from 1640. The farmhouse and attached barn are listed Grade II*. The gatehouse to the farm has a separate Grade II* listing.

== History ==
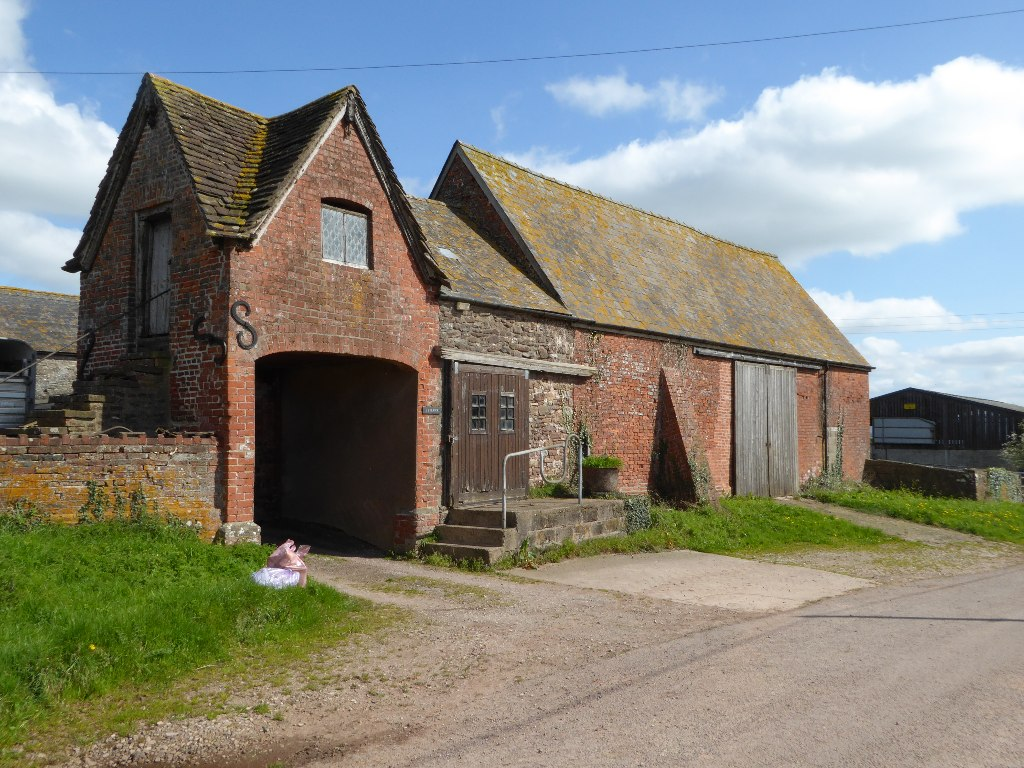
The Grade II* listed gatehouse of Tŷ Mawr, with a Grade II listed barn attached

The farmhouse was built for Walter Williams, a gentry farmer, circa 1640. The Monmouthshire antiquarian Sir Joseph Bradney noted Tŷ Mawr, meaning Great House, was "once an important residence and estate". He records that the Williams of Ty Mawr were a branch of the Williams family of The Artha at nearby Tregare, and that the last owner of that family, Francis Williams, sold the estate on his appointment as British Consul at Smyrna in the early 18th century.

Sir Cyril Fox and Lord Raglan described it as "a good example of a house built on the traditional "Regional" rectangular plan."

== Architecture and description ==
The architectural historian John Newman describes Tŷ Mawr as "an unusually complete 17th century farm complex." The farmhouse is of stone, with two storeys, and to a "3-cell" plan, with a hall and parlour separated by a pantry. The south gable has a datestone inscribed "Hec domus, facta fuit, per W.W., Anno Domini, 1640". The farmhouse has a Grade II* listing. The gatehouse, which has its own Grade II* listing, is constructed of red brick laid in English bond while the barn attached to the farm is of Flemish bond brick.
