= St Mary's Church, Tregare =

Coordinates: 51.7874°N 2.8443°W

Church of St Mary, Tregare, Monmouthshire
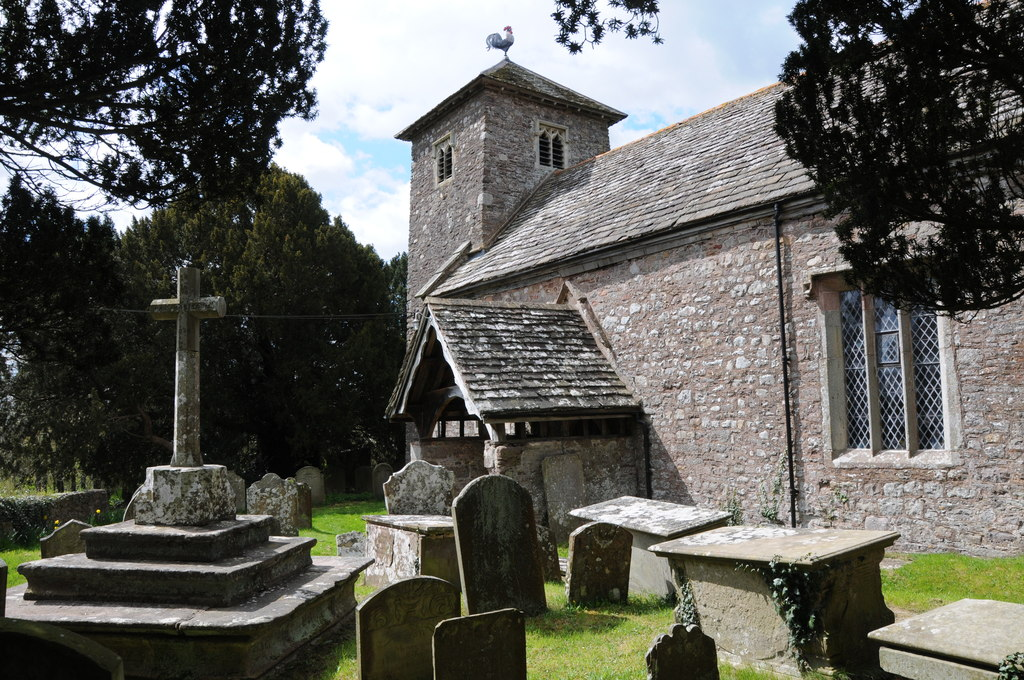
- "a medieval country church of simple architectural character"

- Location in Monmouthshire
- Location: Tregare, Monmouthshire
- Country: Wales
- Denomination: Anglican

History
- Status: Parish church

Architecture
- Functional status: Active
- Heritage designation: Grade II*
- Designated: 27 September 2001
- Architectural type: Church
- Style: Decorated Gothic

Administration
- Diocese: Monmouth
- Parish: Rockfield with St Maughans and Llangattock-vibon-Avel with Llanfihangel-ystern-Llewern with Dingestow with Llangovan and Penyclawdd with Tregaer with Cwmcarvan

The Church of St Mary at Tregare, Monmouthshire, south east Wales, is the parish church of the village of Tregare. Dating originally from the fourteenth century, the tower is later, probably of the fifteenth century. The church was restored in the early twentieth century. Built in the Decorated style, the church is a Grade II* listed building.

== History and architecture ==
The Monmouthshire antiquarian Sir Joseph Bradney records the gift of the advowson of Tregare from "John de Hastings to the see of Llandaff" in 1285. The present church dates from the 14th century, the style a mixture of Decorated Gothic and Perpendicular. The church is built of sandstone rubble, with slate roofs. It comprises a small nave, an "unusual" South porch, a chancel and a West tower, of slightly later date than the church. The tower, with a pyramid roof and cockerel weathervane, is a notable feature. The church was restored by the Cardiff-based architect G.E.Halliday in 1900.

The interior contains an original font, decorated with hearts enclosing IHS symbols, described by the architectural historian John Newman as "a most remarkable 15th century conceit." The church's Grade II* listing entry describes it as "a small medieval country church of simple architectural character".
