= Porth Wen Brickworks =

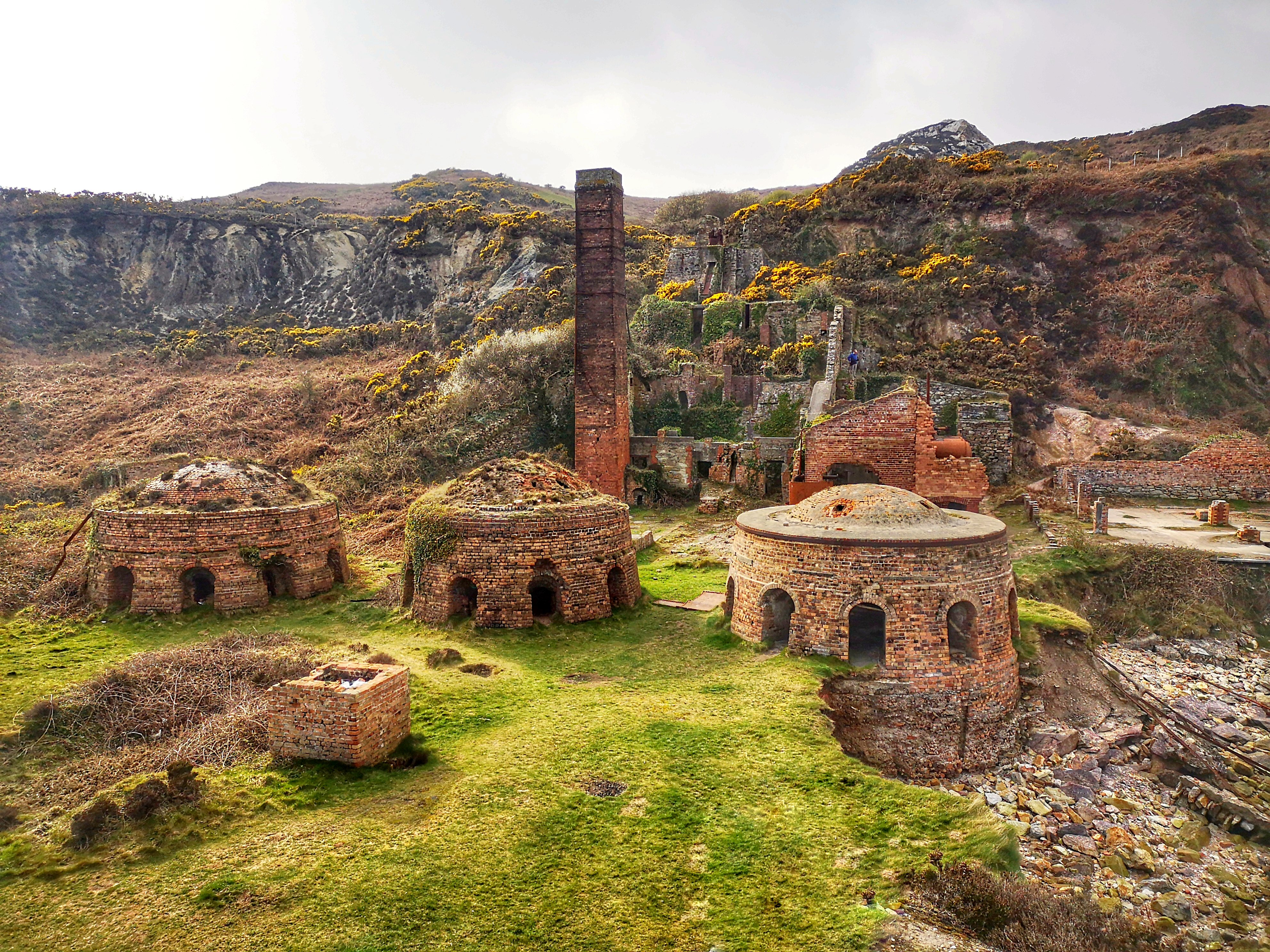
- Kilns and chimneys at the brickworks

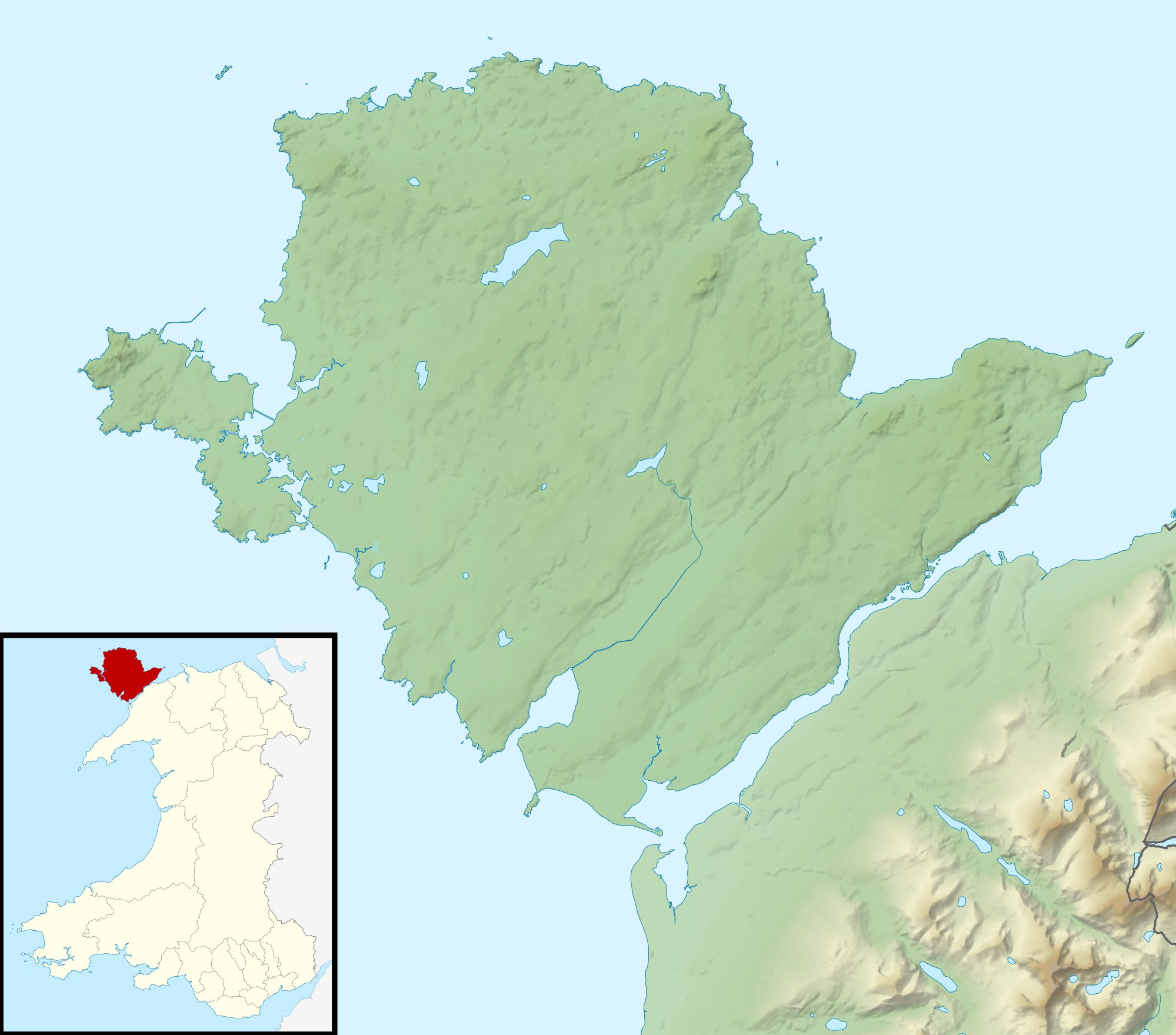
- Location in Anglesey
- 53.424°N 4.406°W
- Type: Brickworks
- Location: Anglesey, Wales
- OS grid reference: SH 4019 9465

Scheduled monument
- Official name: Porth Wen Brickworks
- Designated: 27 October 1986
- Reference no.: AN109

Porth Wen Brickworks first built by Charles E Tidy, is a now disused Victorian brickworks which produced fire bricks, made from quartzite (silica) used to line steel-making furnaces. The substantial remains include a number of buildings and the remains of some of the machinery, but has some damage from sea erosion. The site is a scheduled monument.

== Location ==
The brickworks is in a spectacular location on the western side of Porth Wen (English: White Bay) in the community of Llanbadrig in the north of Anglesey, and is about 2 km (1.2 miles) west of Porth Llechog and 3 km (1.9 miles) north-east of Cemaes. The brickworks was established because of the readily available quartzite from the nearby quarries, a major component of fire bricks.

As with much of coastline of Anglesey, the brickworks lies within the area of the Anglesey Area of Outstanding Natural Beauty (now known as a National Landscape).

== Description ==
Porthwen Brickworks includes quarries, an incline tramroad to the works, and includes a crushing house, moulding shed, drying sheds, and kilns. The brickmaking operation was supported by storage hoppers, engine house, boiler house, chimneys, warehouse and a quay.

Brickmaking started on the site in the mid 19th century, with the tramroad being added later, and the existing buildings being built in the early 20th century. Although the brickworks ceased production in the first half of the 20th century (sources vary on the date; either 1924 or 1949), the buildings and much of the equipment remain in situ, and the site shows:

...the visual scars of time and nature on its rural-industrial face as well as just the immense history built into the very bricks and stones

— Ian Banks

=== Quarries and incline ===
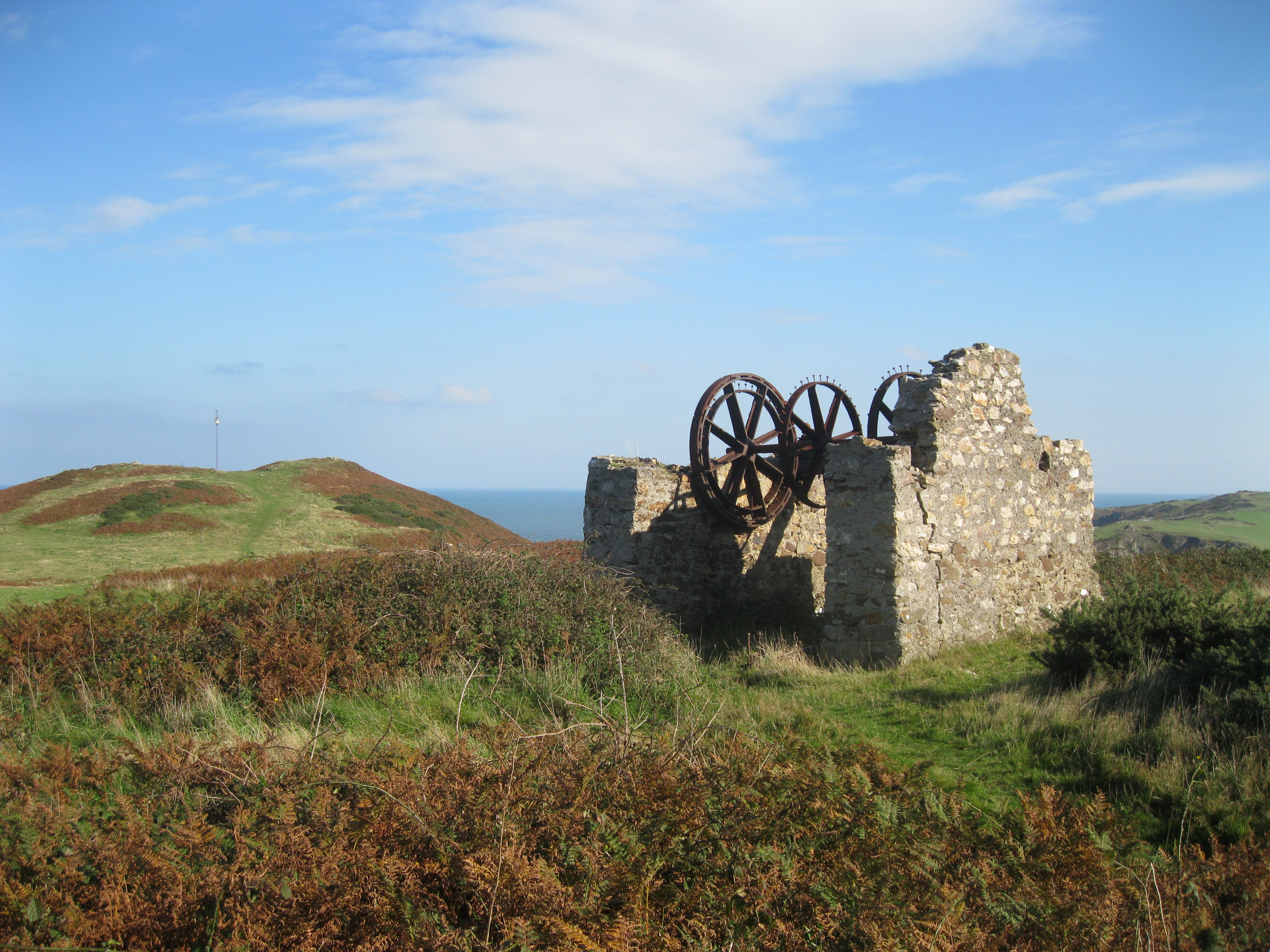
Remains of winding house

The brickworks were supplied from two quarries to the north-west of the works. A tramroad from one of the quarries leading to a winding house and incline was shown on the 1st edition OS map, 1889.

The winding house includes two lateral walls of mortared walls of rubble masonry supporting a square drive shaft and bearings. The remains of the walls are splayed at the bases and roughly 4.5 m (10 feet) in length, 0.95 m (3 feet) wide up to a height of 3 m (10 feet). The drive shaft supported three wheels each with eight spokes. One wheel is roughly 2 m (7 feet) in diameter and the other two are 1.5 m (5 feet) in diameter. The larger wheel was a banding-break and the other two were driving wheels for lowering and raising trucks on the incline. A wooden beam with a control mechanism remains in front the drive shaft. A second similar wooden beam lies nearby but is no longer in position.

Near the winding house are the remains of a storage shed roughly 4 m (10 feet) by 5 m (20 feet) with walls that supported a gabled roof of profiled sheeting and is probably more recent than the winding house, built in a period of improvement in the early 20th century.

The incline consisted of two tracks which have been removed but the track bed remains with retaining walls of random rubble masonry roughly 1 m (3 feet) deep. The incline was gravity powered.

=== Brickmaking ===
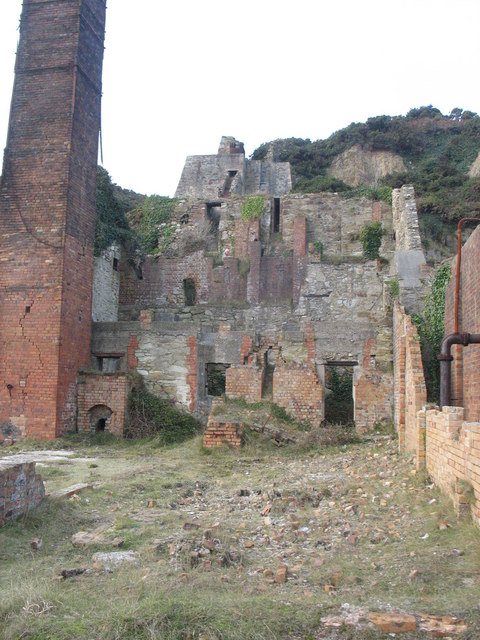
Crushing house

The incline terminated at a crushing house where pieces of quartzite were broken up with a knapping machine. The pieces were passed down chutes to lower levels for further processing, resulting in a fine powder at the lowest stage. It is likely that the pieces of quartzite were reduced by hammer with the workers wearing iron covered gloves.

The resulting powder was mixed with lime and water in a pan mill. The resulting paste was then moulded and pressed into bricks in the moulding shed, and then dried out in drying sheds. Originally bricks were made using moulding and wire cutting, but were later made using a press.

After drying, the bricks were then fired in one of the three circular down-draught kilns (also known as beehive or Newcastle kilns), made of brick with iron bands and domed roofs.

The brickworks also includes the remains of a boiler house, which contained a Five-drum Stirling boiler, and a small engine house for a steam engine.

=== Storage and distribution ===
After firing, the bricks were stored in the main building, a two-storey brick building, with gabled ends.

Bricks were then loaded onto ships, using a crane, moored at the loading quay.

== History ==
Porth Wen brickworks was designated as a scheduled monument by Cadw in 1986 and classified as a post-medieval industrial brickworks.

== See also ==
- List of Scheduled Monuments in Anglesey
