= St Gwenfaen's Well =

Ffynnon Gwenfaen
- St Gwenfaen's Well
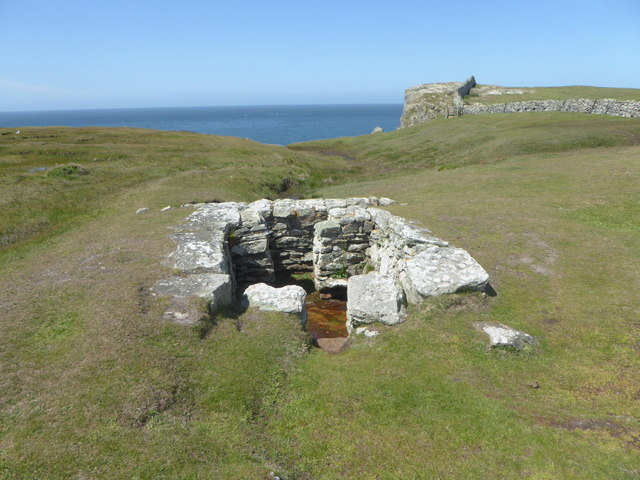
- Remains of well building

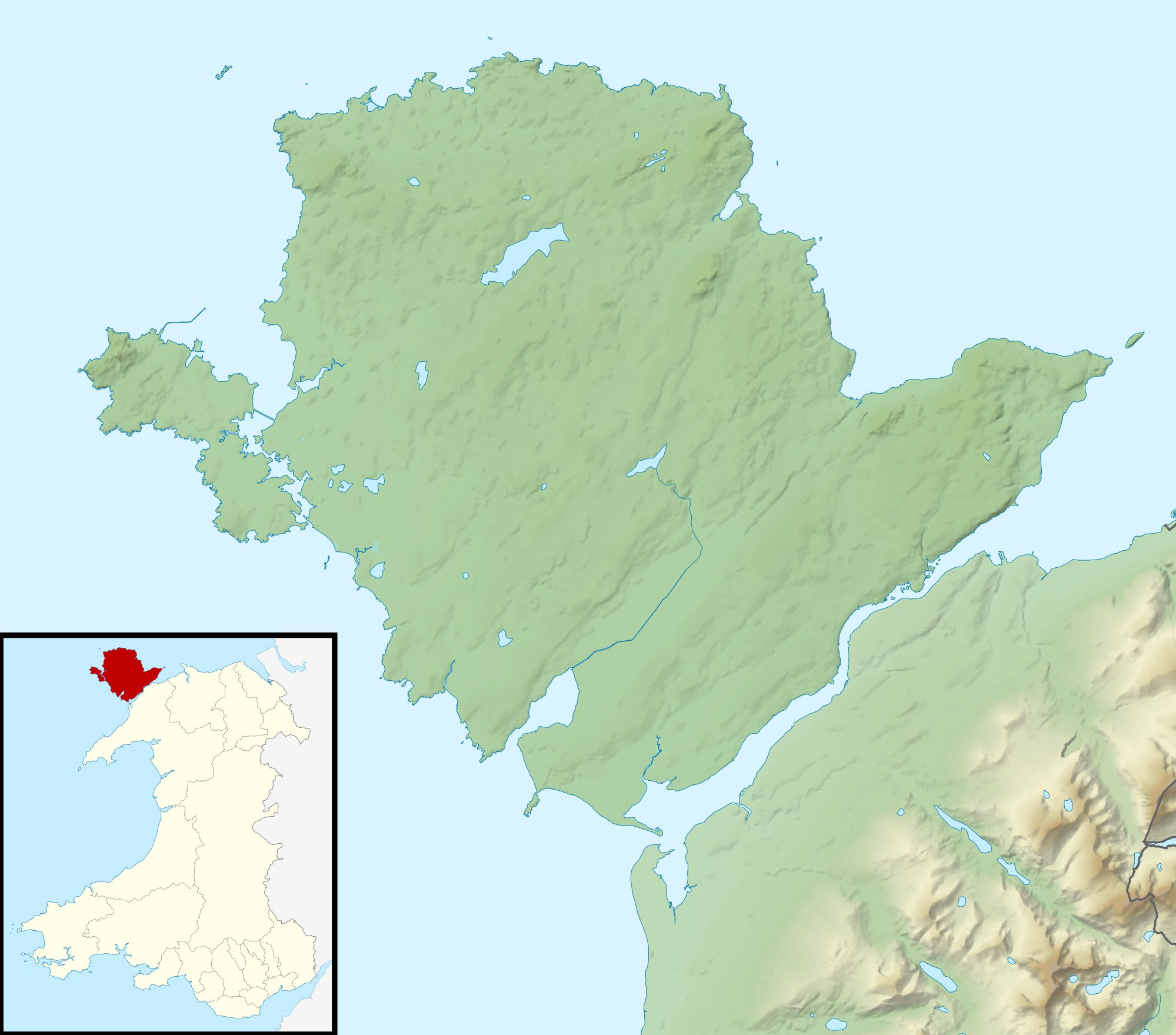
- Location in Anglesey
- 53.247°N 4.610°W
- Type: holy well
- Location: Anglesey, Wales
- OS grid reference: SH 2595 7544

Scheduled monument
- Official name: Ffynnon Gwenfaen
- Designated: 16 July 1987
- Reference no.: AN055

Listed Building – Grade II
- Official name: Ffynnon Gwenfai
- Designated: 5 April 1971
- Reference no.: 5328

St Gwenfaen's Well (also known as Welsh: Ffynnon Gwenfaen, Welsh: Ffynnon Wenfaen and Welsh: Ffynnon Gwenfai) is an early medieval holy well in the south west of Holy Island, Anglesey, named after St Gwenfaen, whose cloister was nearby. The site includes substantial remains of a building and is both a scheduled monument and a Grade II listed building. Traditionally, a gift of two white quartz pebbles thrown into the pool can cure mental health problems.

== Location ==
St Gwenfaen's Well lies in an isolated position in a cleft in the rock in a dell overlooking the cliffs of Porth Gwalch (Welsh: Hawk Bay) in the community of Rhoscolyn in the south west of Holy Island, Anglesey. The well is just under 1 km (0.6 miles) west by south west of the village of Rhoscolyn which is the location of St Gwenfaen's Church, part of the ministry area of Holy Island (Church in Wales).

As with much of Holy Island, the well lies within the area of the Glannau Ynys Gybi (Welsh: Holy Island Coast) Site of Special Scientific Interest and the Anglesey Area of Outstanding Natural Beauty.

== Description ==
The remains of the drystone well house are 4.5 m (15 feet) east-west by (originally) 5.5 m (18 feet) north-south. Three steps descend into the building from the east into a 2.0 m (6.6 feet) square chamber with a flagstone floor and four diagonal stone seats in each corner. A narrow opening and steps lead into the rectangular well chamber, 1.2 m (3.9 feet) east-west by 0.6 m (2.0 feet) north-south, with recessed semi-circular seats at each side.

An outer external well chamber roughly 1.5 m (4.9 feet) square contains the well itself, and is separated from the internal well chamber by a drystone wall, which includes a stone slab with circular grooves cut in its upper and lower edges to allow water to flow between the two chambers. The external chamber can be reached by six descending stone steps on either side cut into the cleft in the rock.

At the western end a stone slab with a hole allows water to be retained in the chamber or be released into a 4.6 m (15 feet) long paved channel leading to a pool 35 m (115 feet) west of the well.

St Gwenfaen's Well has not been accurately dated but is assumed to be medieval. The nearby church dedicated to St Gwenfaen is on the site of an older church dating from 630 AD.

== History and legend ==
Gwenfaen was the daughter of Paul Hen of Manaw (who also known as Old Paulinus), and sister of Peulan and Gwyngeneu, both saints who also lived on Holy Island. She was known for healing mental illness. While being chased by druids, Gwenfaen is said to have climbed a nearby rock stack and was carried away by angels when the tide came in.

An offering of two white quartz pebbles into the water of the well is said to cure mental problems.

== Recent history ==
St Gwenfaen's Well was designated as a Grade II listed building in 1971 and as a scheduled monument in 1987.

The well is blessed every year on, or near, Gwenfaen's Saint's day, 4 November, after Holy Communion in the nearby church.

== Access ==
St Gwenfaen's Well can be reached by footpath, either by a circular route around Rhoscolyn or by following the Anglesey Coastal Path (part of the Wales Coast Path).

== See also ==
- List of Scheduled Monuments in Anglesey
- St Allgo's Well
- St Seiriol's Well
