= Werthyr standing stone =

Standing stone on Anglesey, Wales

Coordinates: 53°24′31″N 4°23′8″W

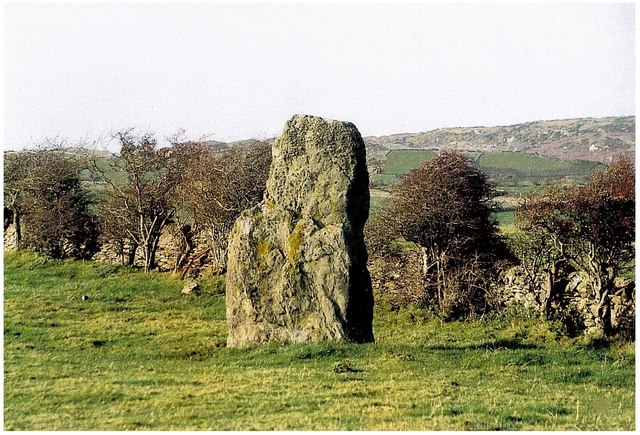
The Werthyr standing stone

The Werthyr standing stone is a standing stone located to the west of Amlwch, Anglesey, Wales. It is around 3.1 metres (10 ft) tall.

== History ==
The stone is thought to date back to the Bronze Age. Early writing suggests that there was a second upright stone and a long capstone, both of which have since disappeared.
