= Menai Strait fish weirs =

Historic fishing traps in Wales

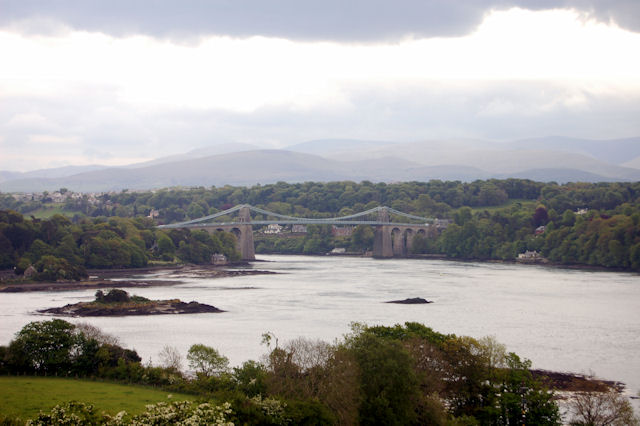
Shoreline on Menai Straits from the A5

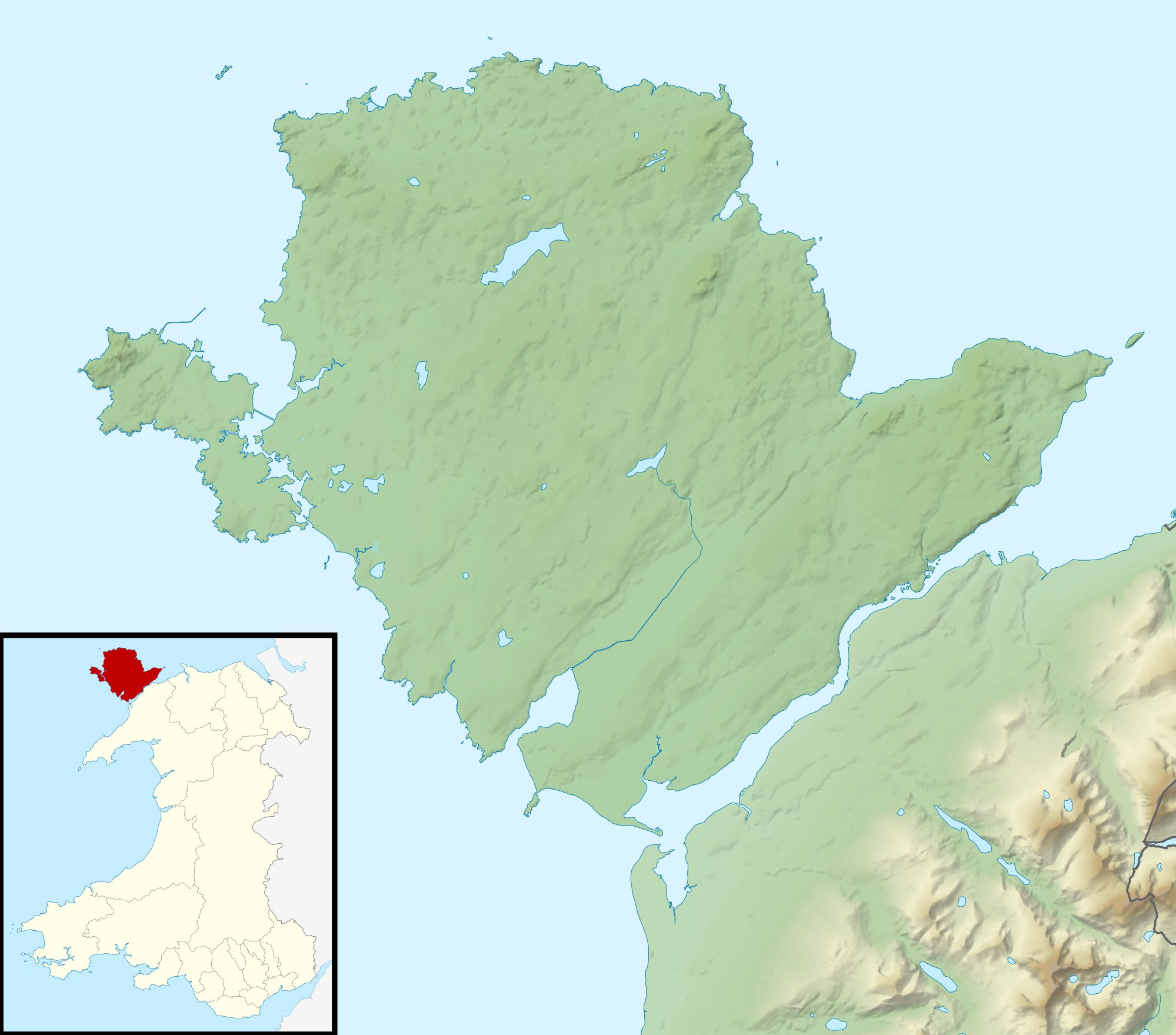
Fish weirs on the Menai Strait.

The Menai Strait fish weirs are historically important fishing traps used in the fast-flowing tidal waters of the Menai Strait, which separates Anglesey from the rest of North Wales. The strait was particularly well suited to utilising fish weirs. The tidal waters pull huge volumes of water past the coastline with every tide, and the weirs and traps enabled fish to be concentrated into small holding areas from which they can be readily caught. Such methods are thought to have been used from earliest times, but the submerged and standing remains along both the Anglesey and Gwynedd coasts are from medieval and post-medieval periods, and in some cases were still in use into the 20th century.

== Types of fish trap ==
Evidence of fishing with nets in the Menai Strait was documented in the 11th century. However the development of various types of permanent structures have been found in the mud and sand of the Menai Strait. Of the various designs used around Britain, three in particular have been noted on the strait: Crescent, V-shaped and Rectilinear. In addition, there are also traps that use natural features, such as a gap between two islands. Crescent Traps may represent the earliest form, and take the form of a crescent of rocks or other material to create a pond at low tide, into which fish can be driven and then contained and caught. V-shaped structures develop this by allowing a sluice at the narrow end. This funnelled the water through a gap around 1.5 metres (4.9 ft) wide, over which a large net bag could be placed to catch the fish as the water drained out. Two v-shaped traps are sometimes located side by side, to create a w-shape. A more developed structure is the Rectilinear trap, which is particularly well represented along the Strait. A dry stone wall runs 200 metres (660 ft) or so directly out from the shore between the high to low water marks. A second wall forms a rectangle to the shoreline, by running a similar distance parallel to the shore. A third, shorter wall runs back at an acute angle on the shorewood side, in a 'hook' shape, to form in effect, a v-shaped funnel within the rectangle, from which the water can be released through a net bag.

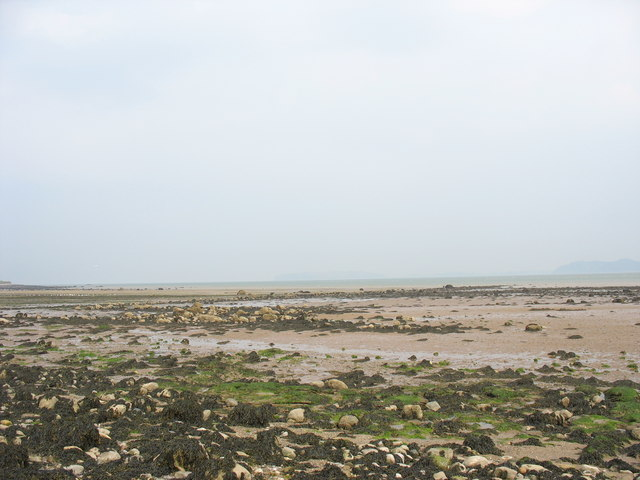
The beach at low tide near Tre-castell Farm. The fish weirs have mostly been identified by aerial images, with little to discern at ground level.

== Anglesey shoreline, Llangoed group ==
Map showing the fish weirs at the northern end of Anglesey's Menai Strait shoreline.

The northern (Anglesey) shore of the Menai Strait has visible evidence of at least 11 fish weir sites. Five of these are northeast of Beaumaris, in Llangoed Community and are thought to have all been associated with Llanfaes Friary. All five are of the rectilinear design. Two were still in use in the 19th century, one of which was still operating in 1960, whilst others were unknown until identified by aerial photographs.

Aberlleiniog Fish Weir II
53.29137°N 4.06288°W (SH 62595 79142). (Scheduled monument). The most northerly of this group, and unusual in that although of rectilinear design, the wall does not run right up to the high water mark. It is unclear if this is due to erosion/loss or was an original design feature. The site is also known as 'Penmon fish trap'.

Aberlleiniog Fish Weir I
53.28978°N 4.06477°W, (SH 62464 78969). (Scheduled monument). It lies immediately south of Weir II, and is more characteristic rectilinear fish weir, with a wall running over 300m from low watermark up to the high water line, and a second wall running 270m parallel to the shore.

Trecastell Fish Weir
53.2862°N 4.07°W, SH621786. Scheduled monument, also known as Gored Tre-Castell and as Gored Mawr.) Good foundations survive for this rectilinear weir, with the remains of wooden stakes still set into the centre. There is clear evidence of alterations to the weir over time. The oldest version was a w-shaped weir, replaced in medieval times by a rectilinear wier, as rising sea levels had left it too deep to be useful. As the sea levels continued to rise, a further adaptation was required, with a new wall still nearer the shore, itself now too deep to be workable except on the very lowest tides. The earliest weir is of unknown date, but its position indicates that the sea levels within the straight have risen 1.97 metres (6.5 ft) since then.

Gorad Friars Bach Fish Weir
53.2781°N 4.0787°W, SH615777 (Scheduled monument). A well preserved rectilinear fish trap just to the south of the beaumaris lifeboat slipway. It retains substantial timber stakes, and was still in use in the 1960s, when it had a range of sluice options to catch different fish. Bass and Salmon could be tempted to come to the outflow by letting out whitebait, and then netting the larger fish. Herring, mackerel and whitebait could all be caught in the trap.

Beaumaris Fish Trap
53.26951°N 4.08483°W, (SH 61061 76753). Identified by aerial photographs in 2006, this v-shaped fish trap is the southernmost of this group, positioned north of Beaumaris Castle, on the shoreline midway between the castle and Llanfaes Franciscan friary.

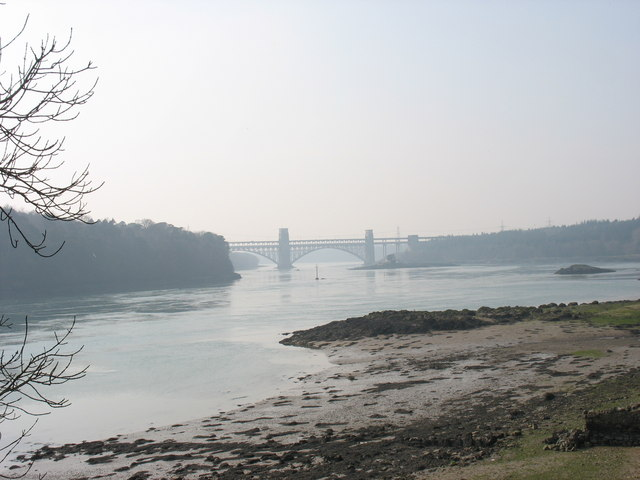
The Swellies at low tide

== Fish Weirs in The Swellies ==
Map showing the fish weirs of the Swellies, in Anglesey's Menai Strait.

The Swellies (or Wellies) are a series of submerged rocks and small islands in the most constricted section of the Strait, between the two bridges. The tides run fastest past these constrictions, which have been used to create a series of fish weirs on the shore and in mid stream. Three are scheduled monuments, all in Llanfair Pwllgwyngyll Community.

Gorad Ddu Fish Weir
53.2214°N 4.1797°W, SH545715. Scheduled monument. A rock outcrop has been used, along with substantial masonry arms to create fish traps on both the west and east sides of the rock. A channel cut through the rock could funnel fish from the eastern to the western chamber. The western side has walls running from both the shore and the island, meeting at a sluice. Grooves in the masonry allowed wattle sluices to drain the basin whilst retaining the fish. An older wall, from an earlier trap, crosses the western basin, and there are remains of holding tanks and other buildings.

Ynys Gorad Goch
Two connected islands with weirs and Smoke Tower. 53.2187°N 4.1813°W, SH544712. Ynys Gorad Goch is the largest island in the straight, and lies mid-stream east of Britannia Bridge. Two islands are joined by a causeway, and each has a fish weir. The weirs were in use in the 16th century, and for much of its history it was controlled by the Bishop of Bangor. By the 20th century it became a tourist feature, with trippers being ferried to the island to enjoy a tea with whitebait. A smoke tower, to cure the fish stands on one of the eastern island, and this plus the more northerly fish wier are scheduled monuments. The weirs are angled to maximise their catch on the ebb tide.

Coed Mor Fish Weir
53.2188°N 4.1841°W, SH542713. Scheduled Monument. Three walls use a small island close to the shore beside Britannia Bridge, to create a fish trap, with its funnel alongside the island

== Other fish weirs on the Anglesey shore ==
Penmon Point fish trap
53.30818°N 4.04095°W, SH64118097. Probable walls of a curvilinear fish trap in the sands close to the tip of Penmon Point, at the northern end of the Strait, overlain by possible rectangular oyster beds.

Two further fish weirs are north of Menai Bridge, near the River Cadnant at Ynys Castell and Ynys y Big. Neither are scheduled monuments,

Towards the southern end of the Strait are various intertidal features which are probable fish weirs. Three of the more distinct are:

Mermaid Inn Fish Trap
53.153960°N 4.2860019°W, SH4723664311. Crescent shaped fish weir totalling some 60 metre in length, south of the Mermaid Inn.
Hedsor Idan Fish Trap
53.1799°N 4.24003°W, SH504671. Remains of probably fish weir in the mud and sand of the Llanidan shoreline.
Llanidan House Fish Trap
53.1752°N 4.25026°W, SH497666 . A series of 8 stone walls possibly representing different phases in its use.

== Fish weirs on the Caernarfonshire shore ==
Only one of the fish weirs on the Gwynedd side of the Strait is a scheduled monument. Five others are also recorded in the coflein database.

Ogwen Weir Fish Trap
53.2431°N 4.09344°W, SH6040173832. Scheduled Monument. Long V-shaped structure on the Bangor Flats, from which preserved posts and wattle have been recovered and dendro-chronologically dated to 1511. 19th century maps show footpath routes from Porth Penrhyn to access this and the cegin weir traps.

Cegin Weir Fish Trap
53.2423°N 4.10687°W, SH6040173832. A long wooden structure over 1 km long, close to, and similar to the Ogwen Weir, and served by the same footpath route.
Gorad Y Gyt Fish Trap
53.2322°N 4.13892°W, SH57337271. Rectilinear fish trap with an additional grid structure visible in aerial photographs.
Coed Twr Fish Trap
53.1986°N 4.209999°W, SH5247169121 . A small V-shaped fish trap built of dry stone walls, near Vaynol Park.
Felinheli Fish Trap
53.1638°N 4.25385°W, SH4942065334 . 15 metre linear structure which may be a fish weir
Gorad Gwerfai fish trap
53.1235°N 4.31616°W, SH45116099. A V-shaped fish trap at the extreme southern tip of the straight, and the Caernarfon shoreline, possibly associated with the St Baglan's Church, Llanfaglan.

== See also ==
- List of Scheduled Monuments in Anglesey
- List of Scheduled Monuments in Gwynedd
