= Perthi-Duon Burial Chamber =

Neolithic dolmen in Anglesey, Wales

Perthi-Duon
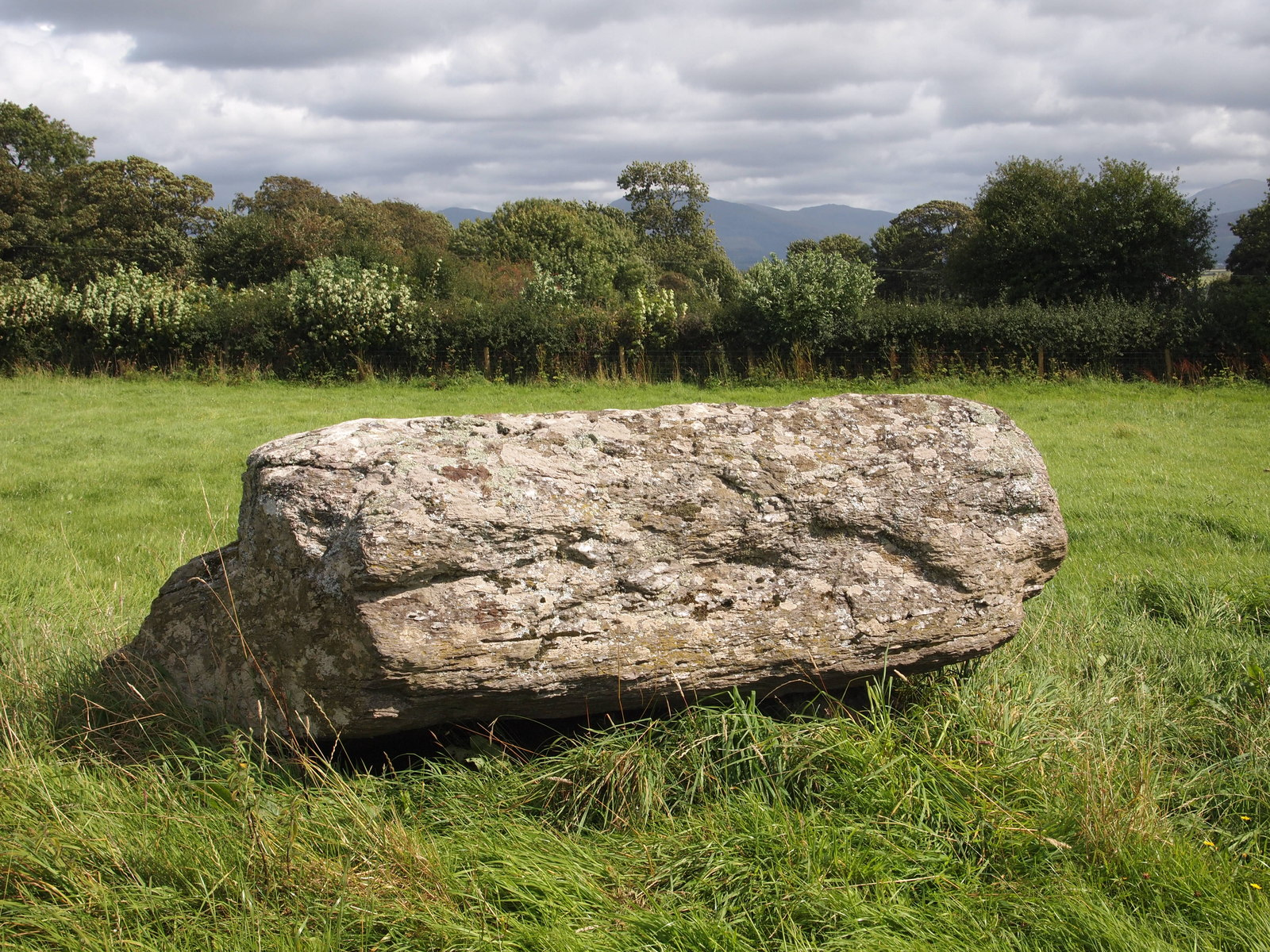

- Location within Anglesey
- 53°10′33.9″N 4°16′34″W
- Type: Dolmen
- Periods: Neolithic
- Location: Anglesey

Perthi-Duon Burial Chamber is a Neolithic dolmen located to the west of Brynsiencyn, Anglesey, Wales.

== Description ==
The monument is a collapsed burial chamber, consisting of a 2.5 metres by 1.8 metres capstone lying on two collapsed stones, which may have been the upright stones. Multiple stones surround the monument.

Whether it's a burial chamber or not is disputed, as some claim that it's just a large boulder in the middle of a field.

The site was examined as early as 1723, when Henry Rowlands, an antiquarian, visited and drew the tomb, which at the time stood upright.

== Excavations ==
On 21 March 2014, an archaeological excavation at the site began. It was carried out by the Welsh Rock Art Organisation under the direction of Dr George Nash of the University of Bristol and Carol James. A copper artifact found during the excavation could support the idea of a Copper Age taking place in the British Isles.
