= Llanbadrig =

Village and community in Anglesey, Wales

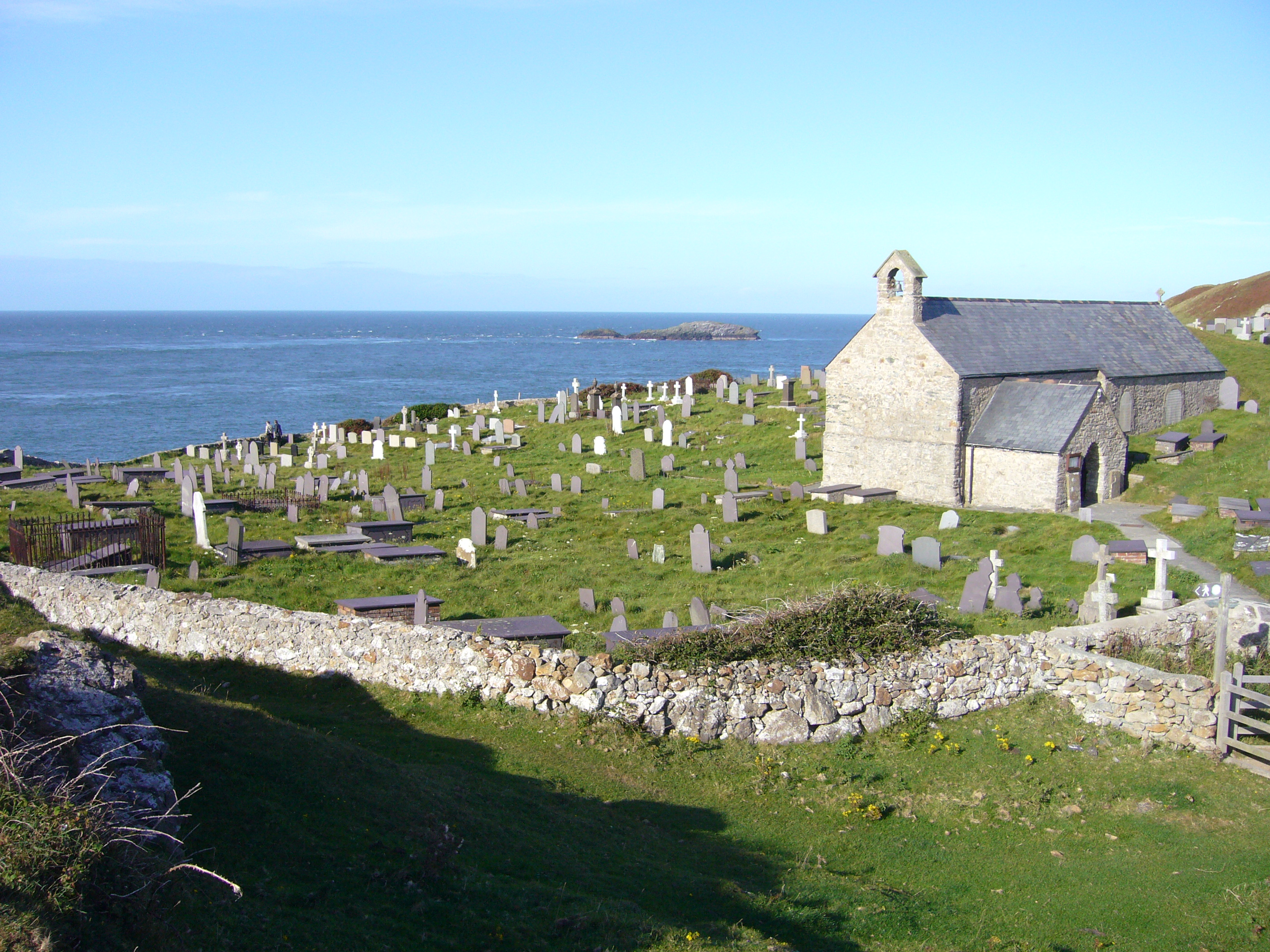
- Saint Padrig's Church

- Location within Anglesey
- Population: 1,357 (2011)
- OS grid reference: SH3794
- Community: Llanbadrig
- Principal area: Anglesey
- Preserved county: Gwynedd
- Country: Wales
- Sovereign state: United Kingdom
- Post town: CEMAES BAY
- Postcode district: LL67
- Dialling code: 01407
- Police: North Wales
- Fire: North Wales
- Ambulance: Welsh
- UK Parliament: Ynys Môn
- Senedd Cymru – Welsh Parliament: Bangor Conwy Môn
- List of places UK Wales Anglesey 53.422°N 4.447°W Map of the community

Llanbadrig is a village and community (and former electoral ward) in Anglesey, Wales. The parish includes the township of Clygyrog, Tregynrig and the port of Cemaes (pronounced "Kem-ice"), and was formerly in the cwmwd of Talybolion. The area has extensive quarries of limestone and marble. At the 2001 census it had a population of 1,392, reducing slightly to 1,357 at the 2011 census.

The Welsh name Llanbadrig means "church of Saint Patrick" and there is a Church of St Patrick on the coast near Cemaes. It is said to have been founded in 440CE by St Patrick himself. Local legend states that Patrick was shipwrecked on the small nearby island of Ynys Badrig (Patrick's Isle, also known as Middle Mouse), which can be seen from the stile in the churchyard wall. The nearby cove is known as Porth Padrig. The old church is Grade II* listed.

Following the Isle of Anglesey (Electoral Arrangements) Order 2012, the Llanbadrig ward was amalgamated into a new multi-councillor ward, Twrcelyn.

Map of the local government Community of Llanbadrig, Anglesey.

== Archaeological Sites ==
There are two Scheduled Monuments within the community.

- Dinas Gynfor Hillfort (53.4274°N 4.4236°W) an Iron Age Promontory fortified site on the Llanlleiana headland, with two sets of defensive walls and ditches across the landward side and precipitous cliffs on the three seaward sides. The interior has been quarried in places. Towards the tip of the promontory there is a tower, built to mark the coronation of King Edward VII. There is also the ruined remains of the medieval Church of Llanleiana near the south-western end of the ramparts.
- Kilns and chimneys at Porth Wen Brickworks (53.424°N 4.4065°W) A now disused Victorian brickworks which mined the local quartsite minerals and used them to produce silica-based fire bricks for use in steel furnaces. The substantial remains include three 'beehive kilns', a number of buildings and the remains of some of the machinery and tramways.

== Trivia ==
Portions of the 2006 movie Half Light starring Demi Moore were filmed in Llanbadrig, although the movie is ostensibly set in Scotland.

The headland was the location for a 'Peace Camp: coastal installation celebrating love poetry and landscape'. This was part of the Cultural Olympiad running alongside the 2012 London Olympic Games, and was one of eight such locations around Britain. For four nights in July, glowing dome tents and recitals of love poetry filled the headland.

Anglesey also has a Llyn Padrig (lake) and Rhosbadrig (farm) located inland from Aberffraw. Atlas Mon shows a medieval place called Tref Was Padrig (transl. "township of Patrick's servant") in that area.

The most northerly point of Wales, Ynys Badrig, is in the community.

== Gallery ==
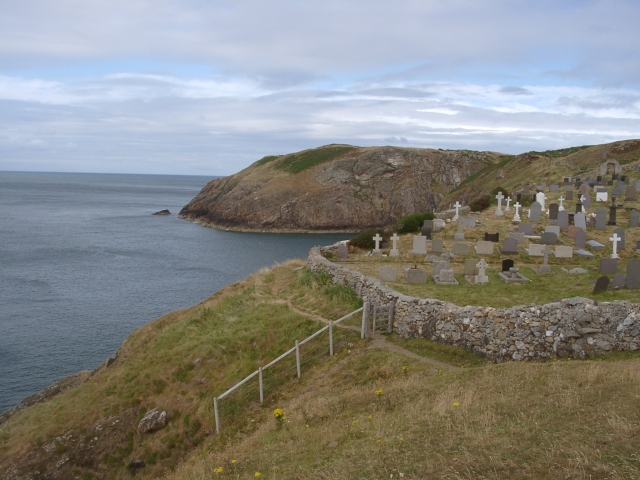
View of the graveyard at Llanbadrig church showing its position on the coast.

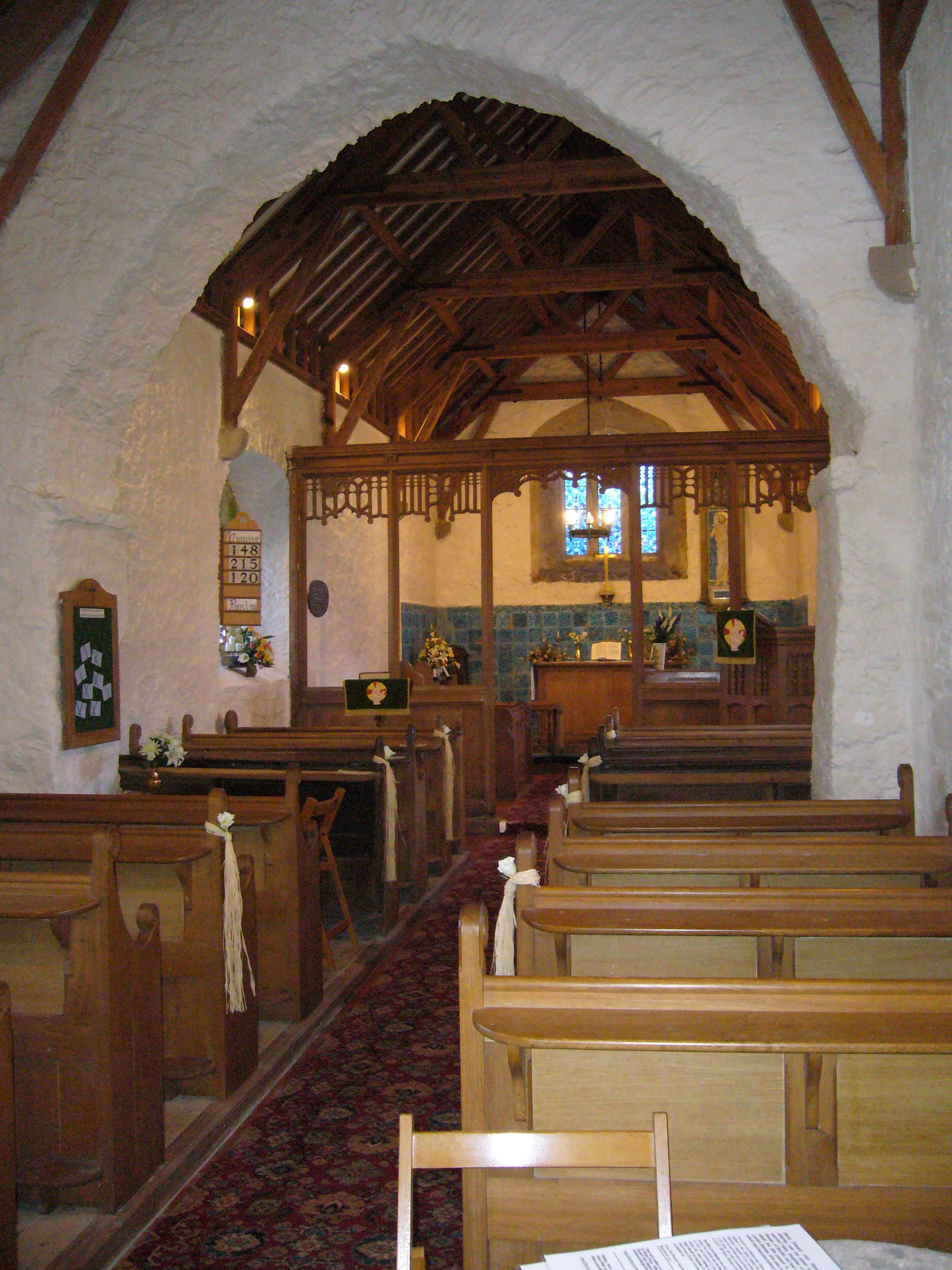
Interior of Llanbadrig church.

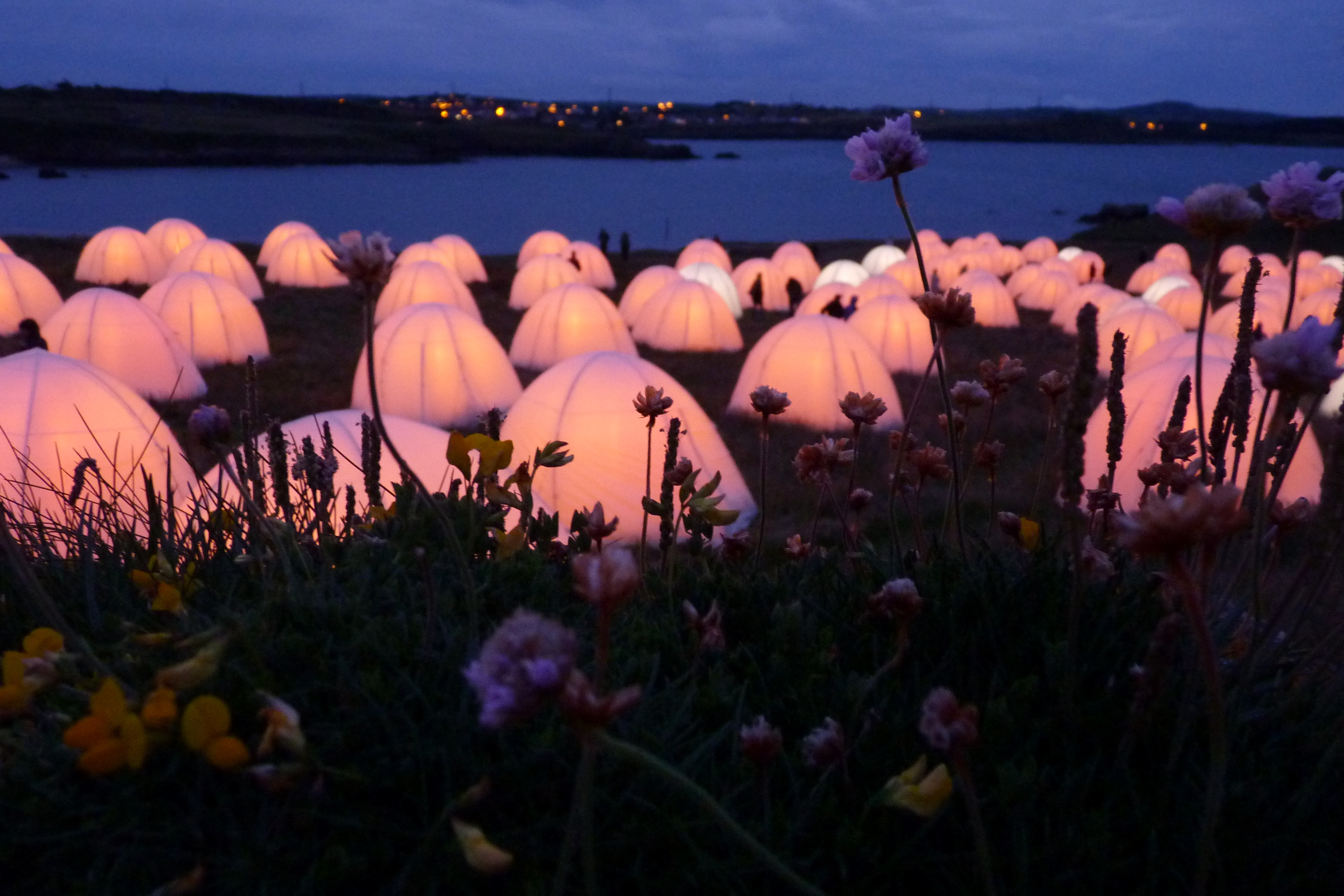
Peace Camp at Llanbadrig Point, part of the London 2012 Cultural Olympiad.
