= The Artha, Tregare =

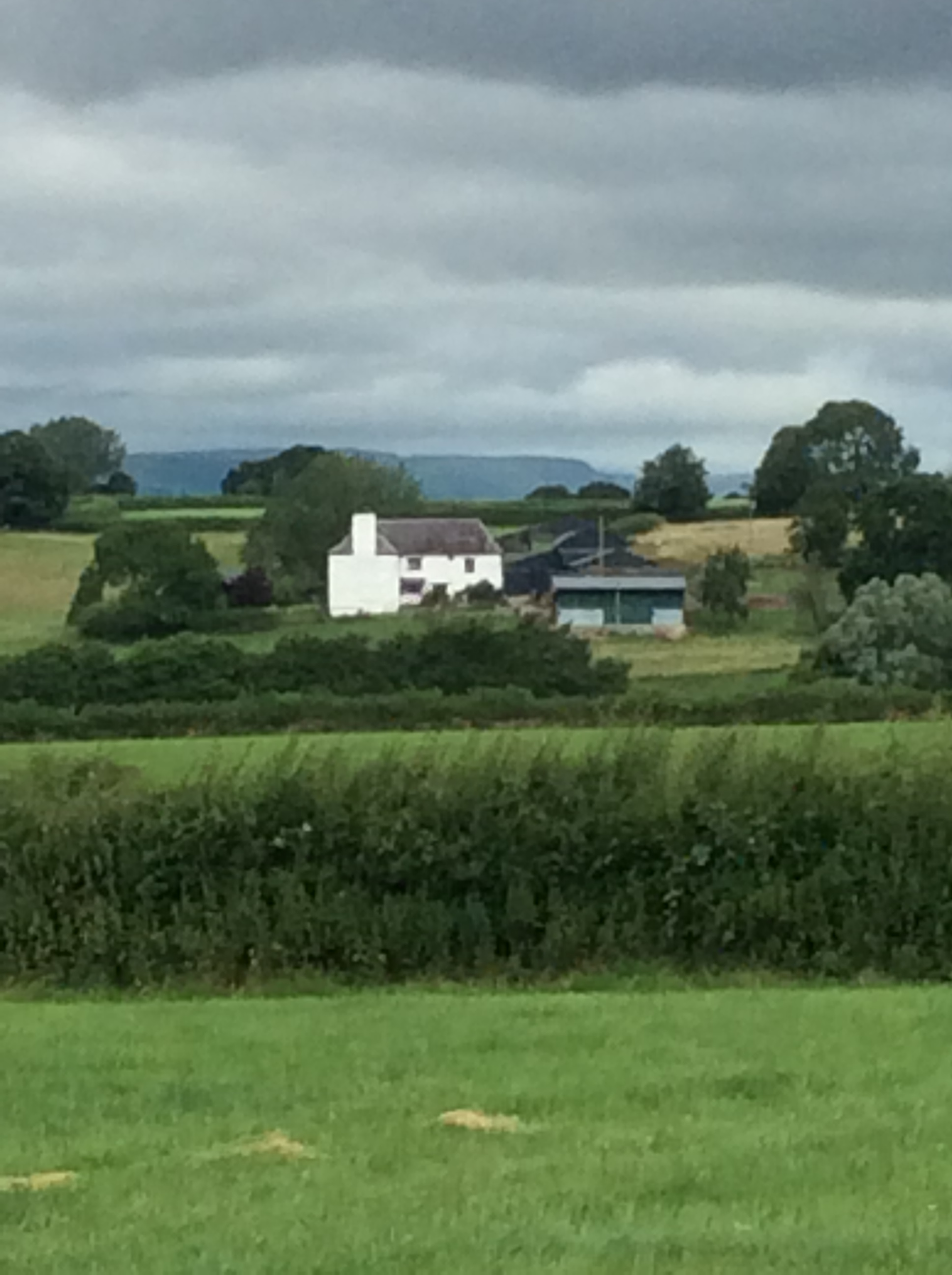
- "a farmhouse of exceptional pretension"

- Location within Monmouthshire
- 51.782586711956°N 2.837541949815°W
- Type: Farmhouse
- Location: Tregare, Monmouthshire

History
- Built: mid-17th century

Site notes
- Architectural style: Vernacular
- Governing body: Privately owned

Listed Building – Grade II*
- Official name: The Artha
- Designated: 1 May 1952
- Reference no.: 2063

The Artha, Tregare, Monmouthshire is a farmhouse dating from the mid-17th century. It is a Grade II* listed building.

== History ==
The architectural historian John Newman dates the original house to c.1600. Sir Cyril Fox and Lord Raglan, in their three-volume study, Monmouthshire Houses, date the extensions, which make the house such a "showpiece", to 1678-9. The rebuilding was undertaken by Issac Williams, whom Sir Joseph Bradney, the Monmouthshire antiquarian, records as the first known owner of the house. Bradney further notes that Williams's wife was "a papist and recusant", leading John Arnold, the local Member of Parliament and known persecutor of Catholics, to give evidence against Williams in the House of Commons. Arnold declared, "Williams hath his Children Christened by a Popish priest, that his wife is a violent Papist and that Mass is very often said in his House".

Bradney goes on to record the many owners of The Artha into the mid-18th century. The house remains a farmhouse and is in private occupation.

== Architecture and description ==
The farmhouse is a three-unit, two-storeyed building on an L-plan.Newman describes it as "a farmhouse of exceptional pretension". The construction is principally of sandstone rubble, with some of the late-17th century extension being undertaken in brick. Fox and Raglan note that this is an exceptionally early use of brick in Monmouthshire for a gentry, as opposed to an aristocratic, house. The hipped roof is of slate. Very large chimney stacks at either end create "an architectural west front of 'dollshouse' symmetry". C.J.O. Evans suggests that the site was originally moated but no trace of such a feature now remains.

The interior has "exceptionally fine features" including a "remarkable" dog-leg stair with carved newel, "impressive" chimneypieces and an "alarmingly low-slung plaster ceiling" with a central rose and cherub heads at the corners. Fox and Raglan noted that the chimneypieces again demonstrated the house's modernity, the decoration echoing London examples of only some twenty-five years earlier - "the time-lag for metropolitan novelties in our corner of Britain is visibly shortening". The Artha is Grade II* listed.
