= Ty Mawr Burial Chamber =

Megalithic dolmen in Anglesey, Wales

Ty Mawr
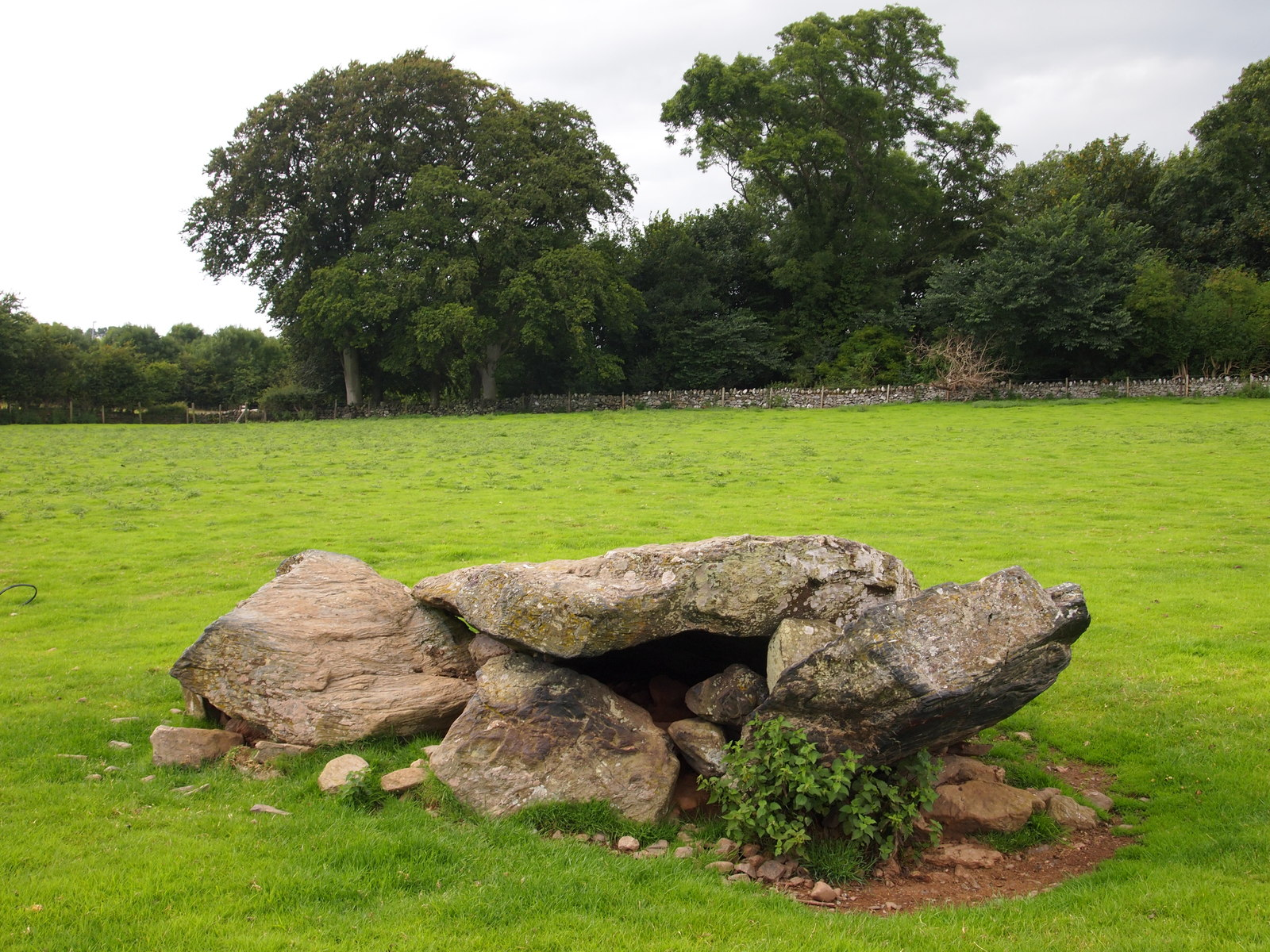

- Location within Anglesey
- 53°13′34.1″N 4°11′25″W
- Type: Dolmen
- Periods: Neolithic
- Location: Anglesey

Ty Mawr Burial Chamber is a Neolithic dolmen located northeast of the town Llanfairpwllgwyngyll in Anglesey, Wales.

== Description ==
The burial chamber is a collapsed megalithic dolmen with a fallen capstone slab, roughly measuring 3.6 metres by 2.6 metres, resting on two flattened stones, both being 1.3 metres long. The collapse of the structure may have been the result of the removal of a stone before 1873, as depicted by the date of when a drawing of the structure was produced.

A sill stone to the east suggests that Ty Mawr was built as a passage grave. The stone would have marked the entrance to the chamber at the end of a short passageway from the edge of a covering stone cairn. The cairn has since been removed, but it was marked on early maps. It is thought to measure about 15 metres by 10 metres.
