= Tregare =

Village in Monmouthshire, Wales

Coordinates: 51.78740°N 2.84662°W

Village church

Tregare (Welsh: Tre'r-gaer) is an ancient parish on the northern border of the Raglan hundred of Monmouthshire in southeast Wales.

== Location ==
Tregare is located two miles north of Raglan in deeply rural Monmouthshire .

== History and amenities ==
The parish church is The Church of St Mary.

It is bisected by the old coaching road from Abergavenny to Monmouth, along which Mail coaches or stagecoaches must have run and two of the original coachhouses, now converted into residential properties, remain in the village.
