= Treworgan Manor, Llansoy =

Treworgan Manor
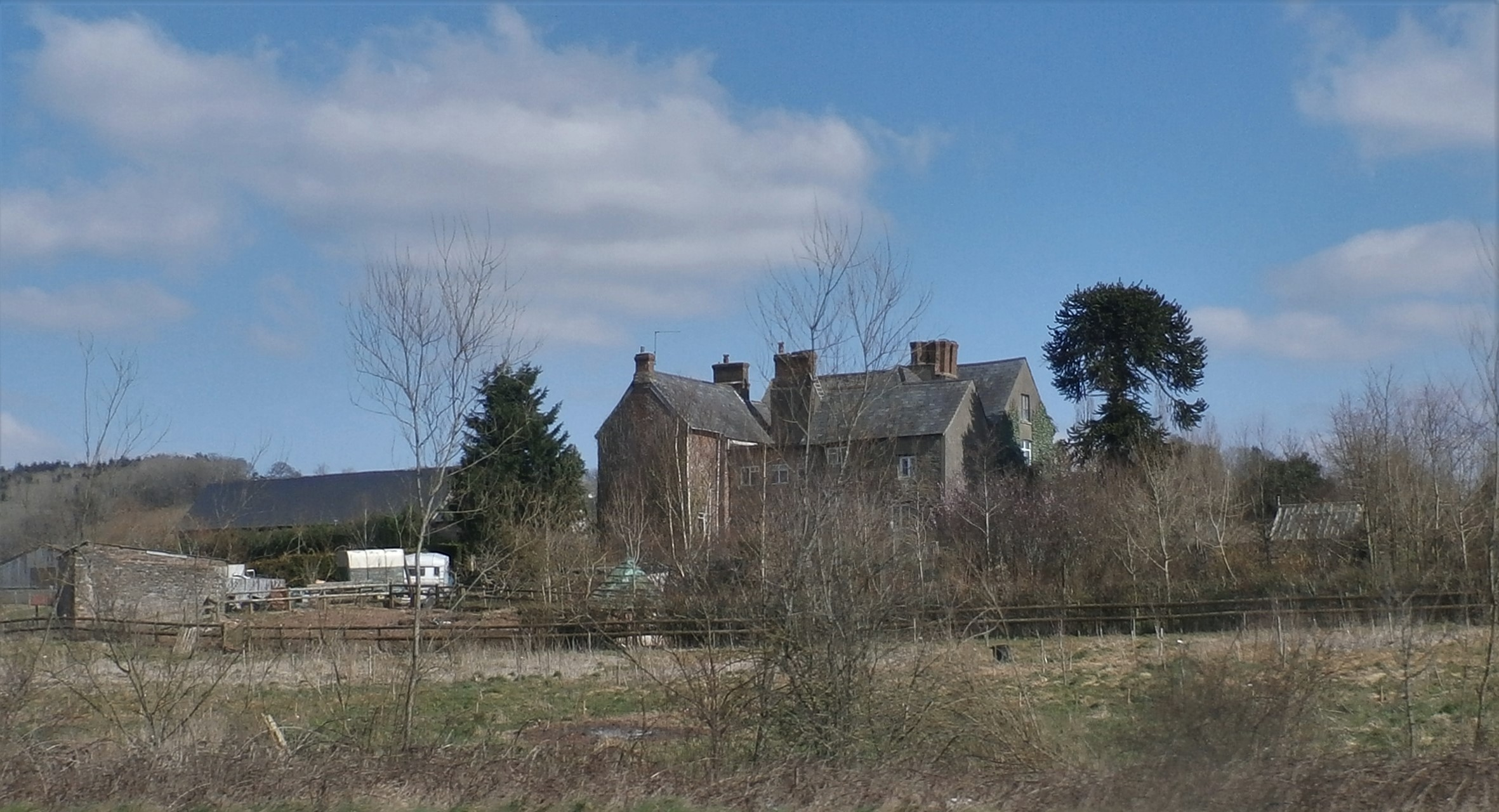
- "a fine Renaissance house"

- Location within Monmouthshire
- 51.7414°N 2.8399°W
- Type: House
- Location: Llansoy, Monmouthshire

Site notes
- Architectural style: Renaissance
- Governing body: Privately owned

Listed Building – Grade II*
- Official name: Treworgan Manor
- Designated: 1 May 1952
- Reference no.: 2067

Listed Building – Grade II
- Official name: Barn at Treworgan Manor
- Designated: 31 January 2001
- Reference no.: 24745

Treworgan Manor, Llansoy, Monmouthshire is a country house dating from the early 18th century. Its origins are older, from the 16th century. Long in the possession of the Prichard (less commonly, Pritchard) family, it changed hands a number of times in later centuries and remains a private residence. The house is Grade II* listed, its listing describing it as a "fine Renaissance house". An adjacent barn has its own Grade II Listing.

== History ==
The original house dates from the very early 1600s. The Monmouthshire antiquarian Sir Joseph Bradney records a datestone showing DP 1605, but this is no longer in situ. According to Bradney, the "DP" refers David Prichard, member of a notable Monmouthshire family who served as High Sheriffs of the county. Walter Prichard is recorded as having played bowls with Charles I at nearby Raglan Castle. Bradney reproduces an illustration of an oil painting showing the house in an elaborate 17th century garden. The house is approached through an avenue of poplar trees and is set in grounds ornamentated by fountains, statuary and parterres. The original of the painting is now at St Fagans Castle, although a copy remains at Treworgan. In the early 1700s, the house was significantly expanded. Sir Cyril Fox and Lord Raglan, in their three-volume study, Monmouthshire Houses, date the rebuilding to 1700–1714. Passing through a number of owners from the 18th to the 21st centuries, the manor remains privately owned and serves as the farmhouse for a working estate.

== Architecture and description ==
The architectural historian John Newman describes the setting of the manor as "uncomfortably close to the A449". The earliest part of the house faces this road and is constructed in stone. The larger, two-storey extension is of brick, with five bays. The manor is listed Grade II*, its listing recording it as "a fine Renaissance house with good interior detail". A barn adjacent to the house has its own Grade II listing.
