= Old Trecastle Farmhouse, Pen-y-clawdd =

Old Trecastle Farmhouse
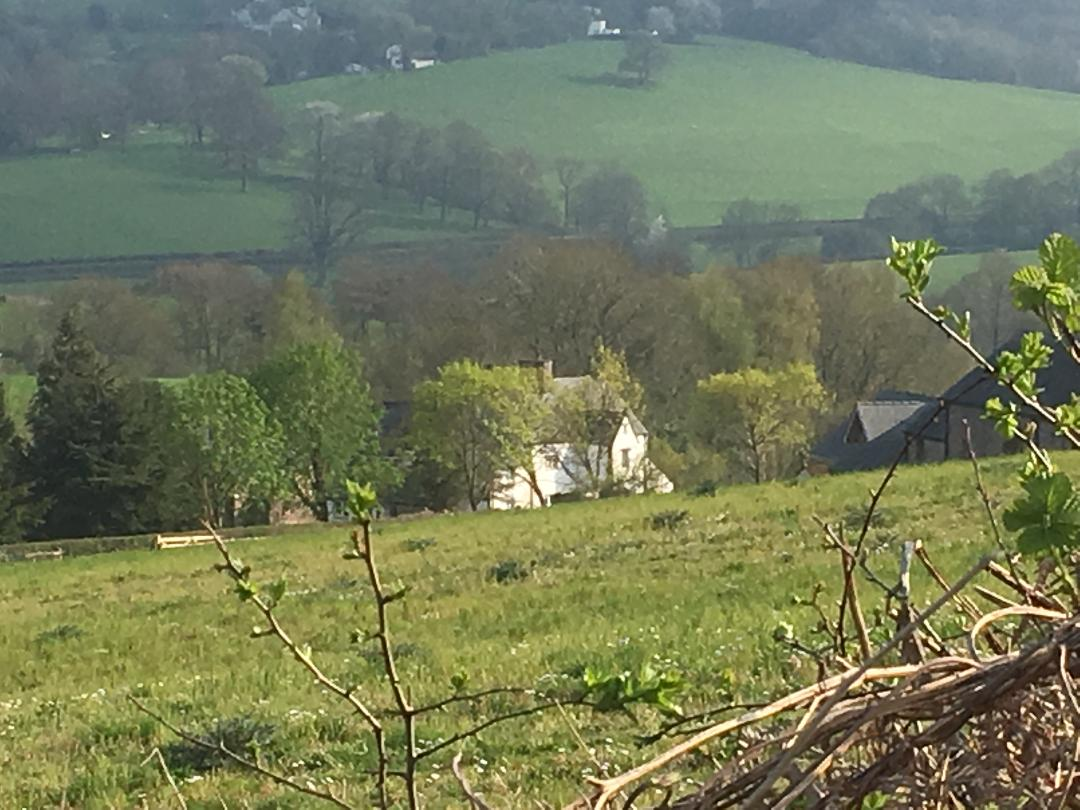
- " an important surviving late medieval to 16th century house"

- Location within Monmouthshire
- 51.7589°N 2.7958°W
- Type: House
- Location: Pen-y-clawdd, Monmouthshire

History
- Built: 16th-17th centuries

Site notes
- Architectural style: Vernacular
- Governing body: Privately owned

Listed Building – Grade II*
- Official name: Old Trecastle Farmhouse
- Designated: 1 May 1952
- Reference no.: 2066

Old Trecastle Farmhouse, Pen-y-clawdd, Monmouthshire is a farmhouse, originally, a gentry house, dating from the 16th and 17th centuries. It stands on the site of the outworks of a Norman motte-and-bailey castle. The house is Grade II* listed.

== History ==
The farmhouse stands on the outworks of a Norman motte-and-bailey castle, suggesting a lengthy history of human habitation. The present building was constructed as a gentry house in the 16th and 17th centuries under the ownership of the Aylworths, Catholic recusants. (Note: The Royal Commission on the Ancient and Historical Monuments of Wales suggests that the farm may be a remnant of a larger, but destroyed, hall house.) (Note: Sir Joseph Bradney, in his multi-volume work A History of Monmouthshire from the Coming of the Normans into Wales down to the Present Time, suggests that "William Harcourt, the notorious Jesuit concerned in the plots of Titus Oates" was in fact William Aylworth, born at Trecastle in around 1625.) In the 19th century, the house, by then reduced to the status of a farmhouse, became part of the Duke of Beaufort's Monmouthshire Troy House estate. It was sold to Monmouthshire County Council in 1900, when the Beauforts divested themselves of their extensive Monmouthshire properties, and is now tenanted.

== Architecture and description ==
Old Trecastle Farmhouse is constructed of whitewashed rubble with a slate roof and chimney stacks of brick. It is a Grade II* listed structure. A stone barn to the north of the farmhouse is recorded on the RCAHMW Coflein database. The house is described, and illustrated, in the second volume of Sir Cyril Fox and Lord Raglan’s study of vernacular architecture, Monmouthshire Houses.

== Sources ==
- Bradney, Joseph Alfred (1992) [1913]. The Hundred of Trelech. A History of Monmouthshire from the Coming of the Normans into Wales down to the Present Time Volume 2, Part 2. London: Academy Books. ISBN 978-1-873-36116-0.
- Fox, Cyril; Raglan, Lord (1994) [1953]. Sub-Medieval Houses, c. 1550–1610. Monmouthshire Houses. Vol. 2. Cardiff: Merton Priory Press Ltd & The National Museum of Wales. ISBN 0952000989. OCLC 277251975.
