= Persondy, Mamhilad =

Persondy
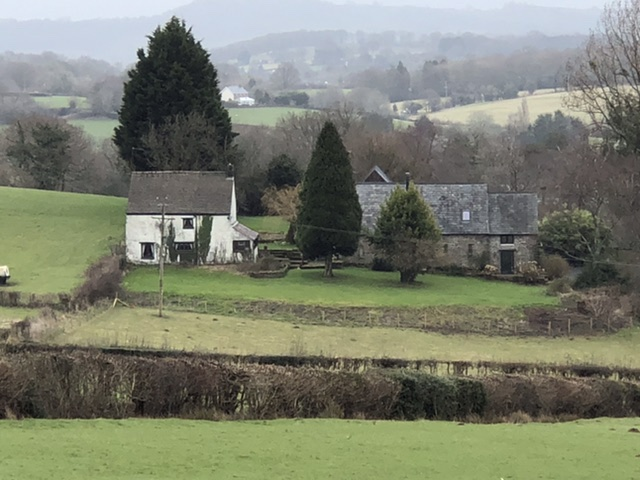
- "A completely preserved demonstration of 16th century joy in oaken carpentry"

- Location within Monmouthshire
- 51.7234°N 3.0133°W
- Type: House
- Location: Mamhilad, Monmouthshire

History
- Built: late 16th century

Site notes
- Architectural style: Vernacular
- Governing body: Privately owned

Listed Building – Grade II*
- Official name: Persondy
- Designated: 4 March 1952
- Reference no.: 2619

Listed Building – Grade II
- Official name: Ysguborwen
- Designated: 18 November 1980
- Reference no.: 2620

Persondy (the Priest's House), Mamhilad, Monmouthshire is a former parsonage dating from the late 16th century. It is a Grade II* listed building. The adjacent barn, now a separate residence called Ysguborwen, has its own Grade II listing.

== History and description ==
The house dates from the late 16th century and is constructed to a two-cell plan. It was built as the parsonage to the parish Church of St Illtyd. It is largely unaltered since its construction, with the exception of the addition of a veranda to the south and east sides in the 1940s. It is built of Old red sandstone which has been white rendered, an alteration which the architectural historian John Newman, writing in his Gwent/Monmouthshire Pevsner, considers "unattractiv[e]". Aside from its unaltered state, the notable feature of Persondy is its "extraordinarily rich" interior joinery, which Newman describes as a "joy in oaken carpentry". David Barnes, in his Companion Guide to Wales, calls the interior "a remarkable survival", and Peter Smith notes the unexpectedly "fine work [to be] found in [this] small, two-unit, house". (Note: In his survey of Welsh vernacular architecture, Houses of the Welsh Countryside, Peter Smith also produced a cut-through illustration of Persondy showing its simple, two-cell plan.)

The adjacent barn was converted to residential use in 1993 and has its own Grade II listing. Coflein considers that the barn may originally have functioned as a tithe barn to the parsonage, following a suggestion first made by Sir Cyril Fox and Lord Raglan in Sub-Medieval Houses, c. 1550–1610, the second volume of their multi-volume study, Monmouthshire Houses.

== Sources ==
- Barnes, David (2005). The Companion Guide to Wales. Companion Guides. Woodbridge, Suffolk, UK: Boydell & Brewer. ISBN 9781900639439.
- Fox, Cyril; Raglan, Lord (1994) [1953]. Sub-Medieval Houses, c. 1550–1610. Monmouthshire Houses. Vol. 2. Cardiff: Merton Priory Press Ltd & The National Museum of Wales. ISBN 0952000989. OCLC 277251975.
- Newman, John (2000). Gwent/Monmouthshire. The Buildings of Wales. London: Penguin. ISBN 0-14-071053-1.
- Smith, Peter (1975). Houses of the Welsh Countryside. London: Her Majesty's Stationery Office. ISBN 0-11-700475-8. OCLC 868639211.
