= Berllan-deg, Llanhennock =

Berllan-deg
- "A substantial and little altered house"

- Location within Monmouthshire
- 51.6466°N 2.9307°W
- Type: House
- Location: Llanhennock, Monmouthshire

History
- Built: c. 1620-1640

Site notes
- Architectural style: Vernacular
- Governing body: Privately owned

Listed Building – Grade II*
- Official name: Berllan-deg
- Designated: 4 March 1952
- Reference no.: 2691

Berllan-deg, Llanhennock, Monmouthshire is a country house dating from the mid-17th century. A rare survival of a remarkably unaltered hall house, Berllan-deg is a Grade II* listed building.

== History ==
The architectural historian John Newman dates the building of Berllan-deg to "the second quarter of the 17th century". Cadw gives the dates of 1620–1640. Sir Joseph Bradney, in his A History of Monmouthshire from the Coming of the Normans into Wales down to the Present Time records the owner in 1635 as John ap Rosser Morgan, and notes that, by the early 18th century, the house was "let to tenant farmers". Sir Cyril Fox and Lord Raglan, in the third of their three-volume study Monmouthshire Houses, described Berllan-deg as "a fine hall-house". The house remains privately owned.

== Architecture and description ==
With the exception of a small extension on the garden front of the house, noted by Fox and Raglan during their visit in the 1950s, Berllan-deg is almost unaltered since its construction. Peter Smith records it as a cross-passage hall house, with a fireplace stair, and post-and-panel partitions. Fox and Raglan produce an illustration showing the house's three-room plan, divided by the cross-passage. Newman notes the "twisted timber stair" in the parlour, between a closet and the fireplace hearth. He considers that Berllan-deg represents the "native tradition (of vernacular architecture) at its fullest development" and the "substantial and little-altered house" has a Grade II* listing.
