= Lower Celliau, Llangattock Lingoed =

Lower Celliau
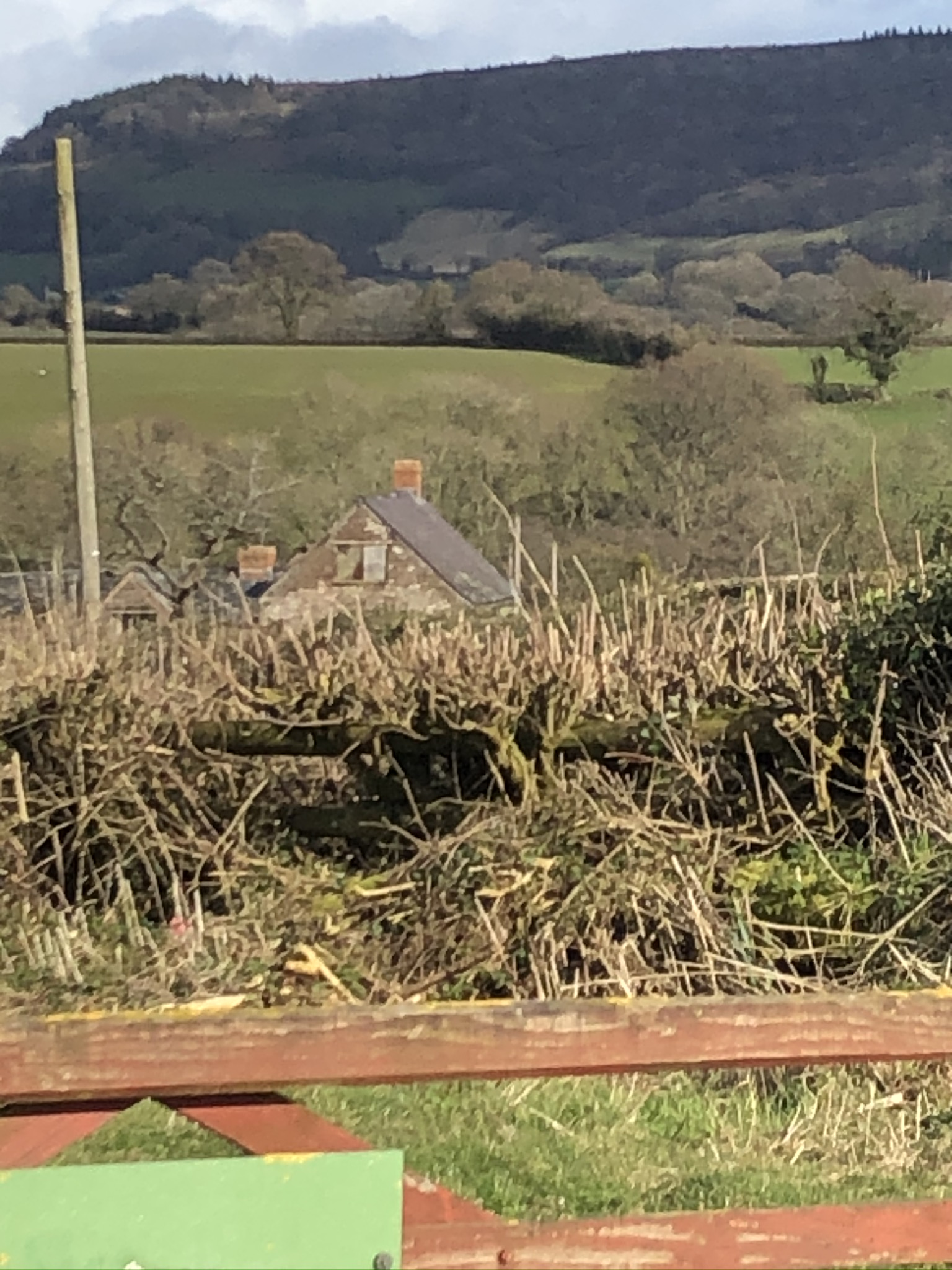
- "exceptionally well-preserved 16th century cruck-framed house"

- Location within Monmouthshire
- 51.8842°N 2.9137°W
- Type: Farmhouse
- Location: Llangattock Lingoed, Monmouthshire

History
- Built: 16th century

Site notes
- Architectural style: Vernacular
- Governing body: Privately owned

Listed Building – Grade II*
- Official name: Lower Celliau
- Designated: 9 January 1956
- Reference no.: 1960

Listed Building – Grade II
- Official name: Barn and shelter shed at Lower Celliau
- Designated: 19 October 2000
- Reference no.: 24182

Listed Building – Grade II
- Official name: Cowhouse and stable at Lower Celliau
- Designated: 19 October 2000
- Reference no.: 24183

Lower Celliau, (aka Lower Kathlea/Lower Celli), Llangattock Lingoed, Monmouthshire is a farmhouse dating from the 16th century. It is a Grade II* listed building. The adjacent barn and shelter, and cowhouse and stable have their own Grade II listings.

== History and description ==
The farmhouse at Lower Celliau is a cruck-framed hall house dating from the early to mid-16th century. In the early 1700s, a parlour bay was added. At a slightly later date, a second, almost free-standing, farmstead was constructed; probably an example of the two-unit system identified by Sir Cyril Fox and Lord Raglan, where two residences are built side by side on a single farm. Cadw notes that the doorcases of the linking lobby are identical in style to one found at Howell's House, Grosmont, a few miles to the north. The doorcase at Howell's House is dated 1611, and Cadw suggests this indicates that the lobby at Lower Celliau was contemporaneous with both the second house at Celliau and with Howell's.

Fox and Raglan, who described and illustrated the house in Sub-Medieval Houses, c. 1550–1610, the second volume of their multi-volume study, Monmouthshire Houses, written in the early 1950s, described Lower Celliau as "long-deserted" but noted the quality of the craftsmanship. In the late twentieth century, when the architectural historian John Newman visited while writing his Gwent/Monmouthshire Pevsner, Lower Celliau remained "disused and inaccessible". The farmstead, which is private property, is a Grade II* listed building, its listing record describing it as an "exceptionally well-preserved 16th-century cruck-framed house". The adjacent barn and shelter shed, and cowhouse and stable have their own Grade II designations.

== Sources ==
- Fox, Cyril; Raglan, Lord (1994) [1953]. Sub-Medieval Houses, c. 1550–1610. Monmouthshire Houses. Vol. 2. Cardiff: Merton Priory Press Ltd & The National Museum of Wales. ISBN 0952000989. OCLC 277251975.
- Newman, John (2000). Gwent/Monmouthshire. The Buildings of Wales. London: Penguin. ISBN 0-14-071053-1.
