= Ton Farmhouse, Llangybi =

Ton Farmhouse
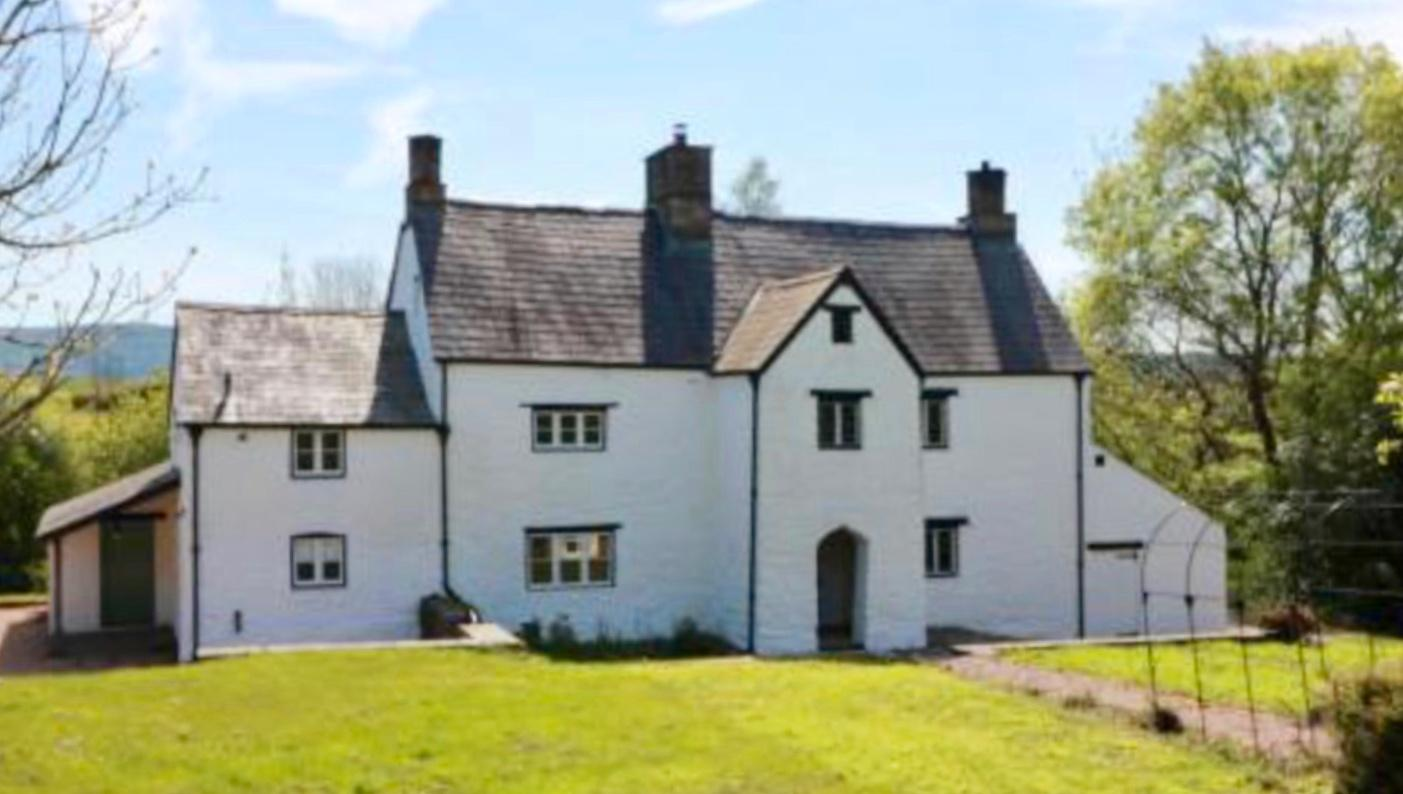
- "a perfect Monmouthshire farmhouse"

- Location within Monmouthshire
- 51.6577°N 2.9194°W
- Type: Farmhouse
- Location: Llangybi, Monmouthshire

History
- Built: early 17th century

Site notes
- Architectural style: Vernacular
- Governing body: Privately owned

Listed Building – Grade II*
- Official name: Ton Farmhouse
- Designated: 4 March 1952
- Reference no.: 2686

Ton Farmhouse, Llangybi, Monmouthshire is a farmhouse dating from the early 17th century. John Newman, in his Monmouthshire Pevsner, describes it as a "perfect Monmouthshire farmhouse". Ton is a Grade II* listed building, its listing noting that it is a "remarkably good survival" of a prosperous 17th century Welsh farmhouse.

== History and description ==
Sir Joseph Bradney records the site of the farmhouse as Ton-y-beddau, which he translates as "the glade of the graves" and refers to a "vague tradition of a battle and the burying of corpses". His multi-volume study, A History of Monmouthshire from the Coming of the Normans into Wales down to the Present Time, also provides a lengthy pedigree of the owners of the surrounding lands. Cadw dates the construction of Ton Farm to the early 17th century. The farmhouse was "greatly enlarged" in 1663, with an inscribed datestone recording the date. In the 1895 Monmouthshire edition of Kelly's Directory, the farm is noted as being under the management of John Griffiths, farmer. Ton remains a privately owned house and is a Grade II* listed building. The architectural historian John Newman describes it as a "perfect Monmouthshire farmhouse".

The farm is of two-storeys, built in whitewashed old red sandstone rubble. The roofs are of Welsh slate. Most of the windows were replaced in the 19th century but the house has been "little altered" since this date. Sir Cyril Fox and Lord Raglan include a plan of Ton in the third volume, Renaissance Houses, c. 1590–1714, of their three-volume study of the vernacular architecture of the county, Monmouthshire Houses. Their plan shows the three-room ground-floor layout of the house after the 1663 alterations, with the hall and parlour divided by a cross-passage, and a pantry to the rear of the hall. The plan includes illustrations of the elaborate joinery in the parlour, a feature also noted by Cadw. A line drawing of a section of moulding from the house is given in Peter Smith's Houses of the Welsh Countryside.

== Sources ==
- Bradney, Joseph Alfred (1993) [1921]. The Hundred of Usk, first part. A History of Monmouthshire from the Coming of the Normans into Wales down to the Present Time Volume 3, Part 1. London: Academy Books. ISBN 9781873361177. OCLC 896118895.
- Fox, Cyril; Raglan, Lord (1994) [1954]. Renaissance Houses, c. 1590–1714. Monmouthshire Houses. Vol. 3. Cardiff: Merton Priory Press Ltd & The National Museum of Wales. ISBN 1898937001. OCLC 776066469.
- Newman, John (2000). Gwent/Monmouthshire. The Buildings of Wales. London: Penguin. ISBN 0-14-071053-1.
- Smith, Peter (1975). Houses of the Welsh Countryside. London: Her Majesty's Stationery Office. ISBN 0-11-700475-8. OCLC 868639211.
