= Cwrt y Brychan barn, stable and granary =

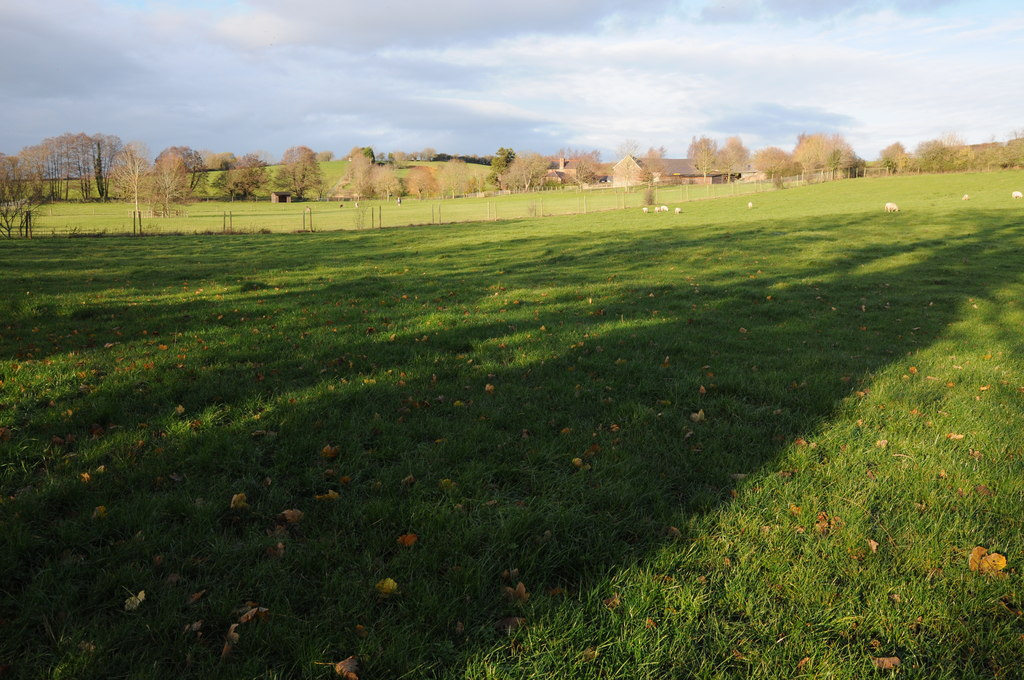
- "a fine C15 to C16 cruck-framed barn"

- Location within Monmouthshire
- 51.7098°N 2.7982°W
- Type: Barn
- Location: Llansoy, Monmouthshire

History
- Built: 16th century

Site notes
- Architectural style: Vernacular
- Governing body: Privately owned

Listed Building – Grade II*
- Official name: Barn with stable and granary at Cwrt-y-Brychan
- Designated: 19 August 1955
- Reference no.: 2033

Listed Building – Grade II
- Official name: Cwrt y Brychan
- Designated: 19 August 1955
- Reference no.: 2032

The barn, stable and granary at Cwrt y Brychan (Brecon Court), Llansoy, Monmouthshire are a range of farm buildings constructed in the 16th century. The origins are the site are ancient and the court is historically connected with the kingdom of Brycheiniog. The complex has a Grade II* listing, with the court having a separate Grade II listing.

== History ==
Cadw records the "legendary" connection between the court and the Early Middle Ages kingdom of Brycheiniog which was located to the north of Monmouthshire in the southern part of the historic county of Brecknockshire. The court dates from the mid-16th century, and was in the ownership of the Nicholls family in the 17th and 18th centuries. The barn, stable and granary were constructed during the Nicholls' ownership. The architectural historian John Newman dates the barn to the 16th century but Cadw suggests a slightly earlier date of the 15th century. Both agree that the stable and granary were later additions. The estate is recorded as being sold in 1901. The farmstead complex is listed Grade II*. The farmhouse, of what remains a privately owned estate, has been "drastically modernized" but has a Grade II listing.

== Architecture and description ==
Newman records the barn as having five bays, with a cruck-truss roof. Sir Cyril Fox and Lord Raglan, writing in the first volume of their three-volume study Monmouthshire Houses, describe four cruck-trusses but Cadw considers that they were in error, the building having only three. Fox and Raglan write that "nothing in medieval architecture prepares one for the massive dignity and functional simplicity of these constructions". The complex is constructed of rubble with a Welsh slate roof. The 17th century stable has some rare ovolo-moulded mullion windows.
