= Pwll, Tregare =

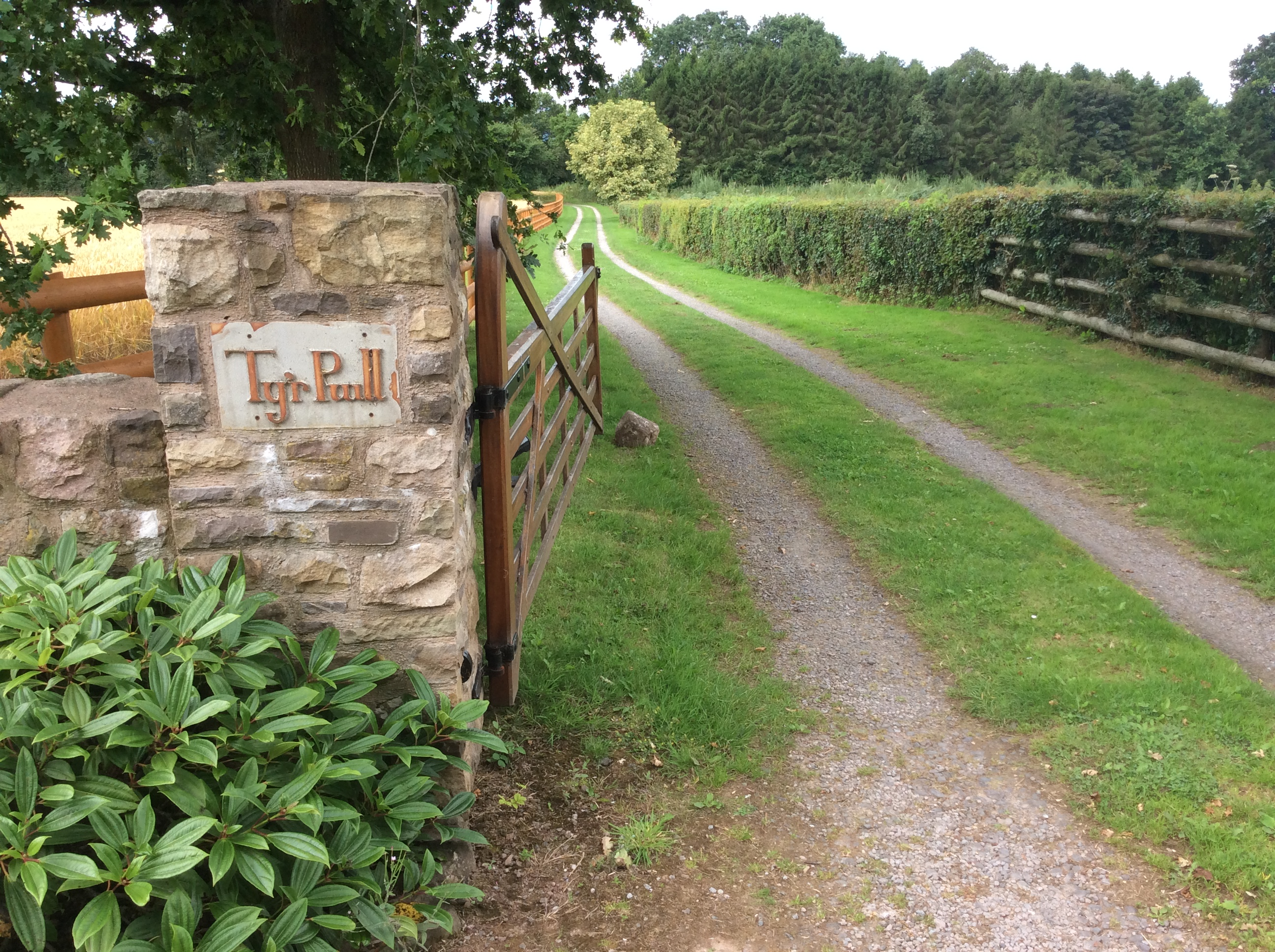
- "an extremely rare survival of a small cruck-framed medieval house"

- Location within Monmouthshire
- 51.7828°N 2.8569°W
- Type: House
- Location: Tregare, Monmouthshire

History
- Built: 14th–17th centuries

Site notes
- Architectural style: Vernacular

Listed Building – Grade II*
- Official name: Pwll
- Designated: 19 November 1953
- Reference no.: 2090

Pwll, Tregare, Monmouthshire is a medieval cruck-house dating from the late 14th century, with additions in the 17th century. An "extremely rare survival", the house was derelict by the mid-20th century, and was reconstructed in the mid-1990s. It is a Grade II* listed building.

== History and description ==
Fox and Raglan, writing in the first volume of their three-volume study Monmouthshire Houses, considered that the original house could "hardly be later than c.1500". A later survey by the Royal Commission on the Ancient and Historical Monuments of Wales suggested an earlier date from the 14th century. In 1948, when Fox and Raglan visited, they described it as "suitable for Little Red Riding Hood's grandmamma to live in", noting its almost complete state. By the middle of the 20th century, however, the house was derelict. It was restored in 1990-1995.

The architectural historian John Newman described Pwll as a "two-unit cruck-truss hall house". The house is constructed of rubble, timber and brick, and is of two storeys with a modern tiled roof. Pwll is a Grade II* listed building.

== Sources ==
- Fox, Cyril; Raglan, Lord (1994). Part I, Medieval Houses. Monmouthshire Houses. Cardiff: Merton Priory Press Ltd & The National Museum of Wales. OCLC 934880833.
- Newman, John (2000). Gwent/Monmouthshire. The Buildings of Wales. London: Penguin. ISBN 0-14-071053-1.
