= The Old Cottage, Treadam, Llantilio Crossenny =

The Old Cottage
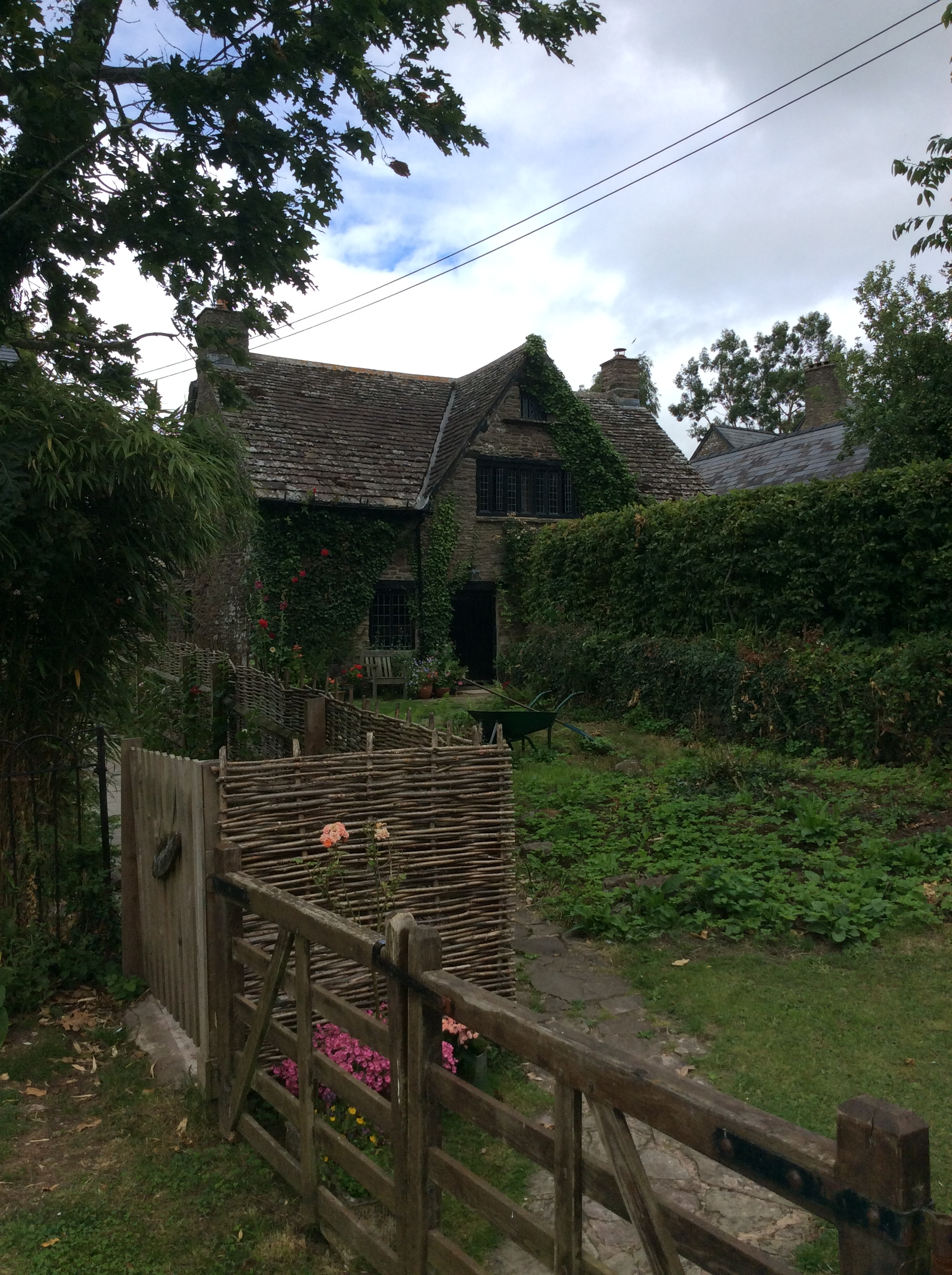
- "a rare and remarkably unaltered 16th century cottage "

- Location within Monmouthshire
- 51.8351°N 2.901°W
- Type: House
- Location: Llanvihangel Crucorney, Monmouthshire

History
- Built: c1600

Site notes
- Architectural style: Vernacular
- Governing body: Privately owned

Listed Building – Grade II*
- Official name: The Old Cottage
- Designated: 28 June 1955
- Reference no.: 15761

The Old Cottage, in the hamlet of Treadam, some 2 km north-west of Llantilio Crossenny, Monmouthshire, is a country house dating from c.1600. The house is Grade II* listed.

== History ==
The Monmouthshire writer and artist Fred Hando, recording a visit to the Old Cottage made in the 1960s, notes a plaque above the door giving a construction date of "C 1600". The architectural historian John Newman gives tentative support to this date. The settlement of Treadam was "a sizeable medieval hamlet" and Hando suggests that it was the domain of one Adam, Tre-Adam meaning "the homestead of Adam", recorded as reeve to the Lordship of White Castle in 1256–57. The small group of buildings of which the Old Cottage is a part are all that remains of this medieval settlement. In the 19th century, when it formed part of the estate of Llantilio Court, the cottage was extended and converted to two dwellings. In the 20th century, it was converted back into a single home and an extension added to the rear. It remains a private house.

== Architecture and description ==
Fox and Raglan produced a sketch plan of the cottage in the second volume of their three-volume series Monmouthshire Houses. This shows the original two-room lay-out of the cottage. The cottage is constructed of Old Red Sandstone slabs, with a slate roof.

The large, centrally-placed, gable dates from the 17th century. The left-hand of the two doors in the main facade dates from the 19th century conversion into two dwellings. Internally, Hando records the "imposing oaken screen of studs and panels" which separate the ground floor into two apartments. Cadw records the Elizabethan mullion windows. Newman notes that the original house did not have an upper storey, "only a habitable roof space". The cottage is a Grade II* listed building, its designation recording it as a "rare and remarkably unaltered 16th century cottage".
