= Blaengavenny Farmhouse, Llanvihangel Crucorney =

Blaengavenny Farmhouse
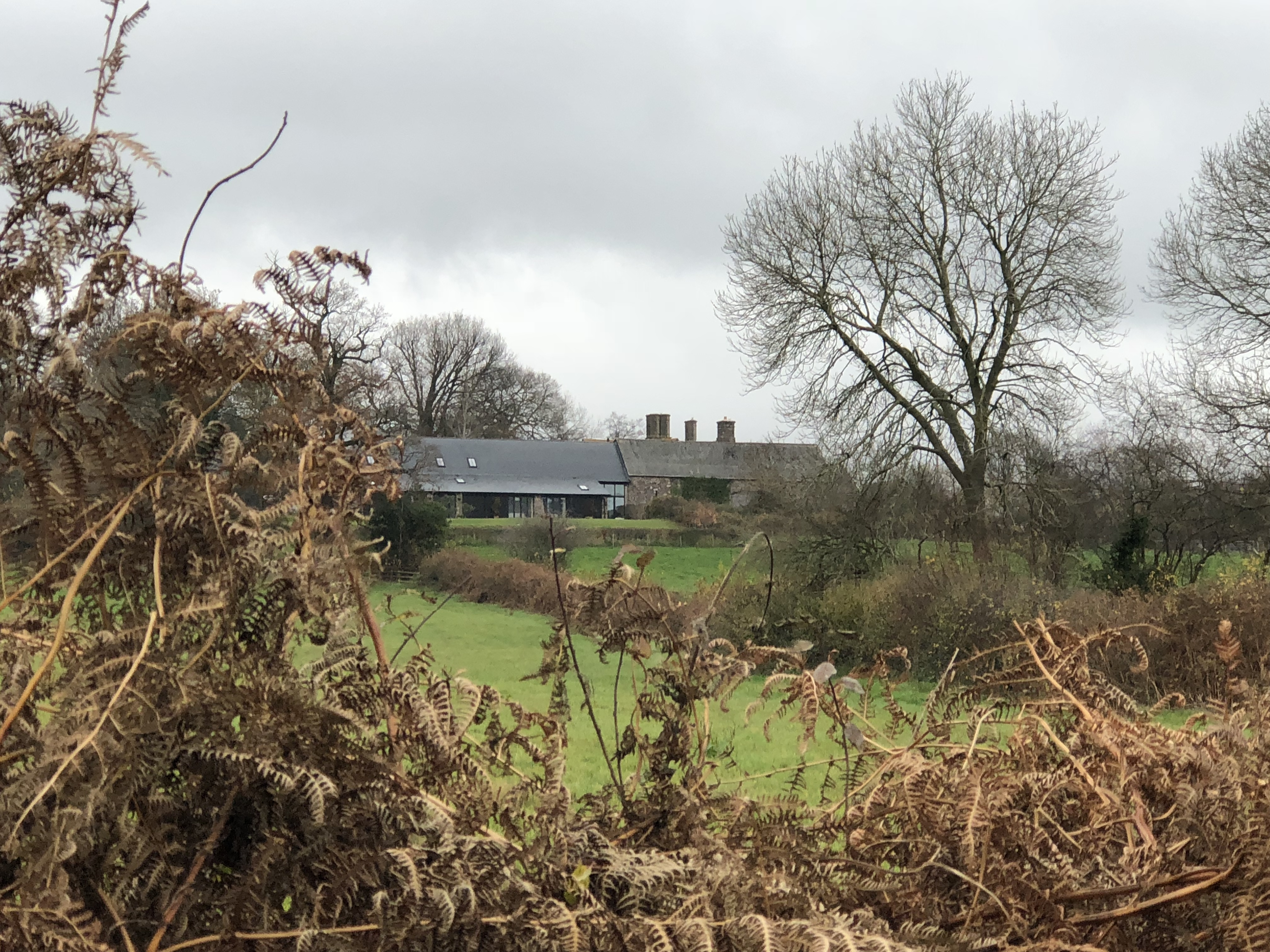
- "an exceptionally interesting late medieval house"

- Location within Monmouthshire
- 51.8712°N 3.0019°W
- Type: Farmhouse
- Location: Llanvihangel Crucorney, Monmouthshire

History
- Built: Late medieval

Site notes
- Architectural style: Vernacular
- Governing body: Privately owned

Listed Building – Grade II*
- Official name: Blaengavenny Farmhouse
- Designated: 9 January 1956
- Reference no.: 2003

Listed Building – Grade II
- Official name: Barn at Blaengavenny Farm
- Designated: 29 January 1998
- Reference no.: 19250

Listed Building – Grade II
- Official name: Granary and malthouse at Blaengavenny Farm
- Designated: 29 January 1998
- Reference no.: 19259

Blaengavenny Farmhouse, Llanvihangel Crucorney, Monmouthshire is a farmhouse of late medieval origins. It is a Grade II* listed building. Its adjacent barn and granary have separate Grade II listings.

== History ==
Cadw dates the earliest parts of the farmhouse to the period 1480–1520. In the 17th century, the hall was sub-divided creating an upper floor, with other work being undertaken. This later building is indicated by a date stone set in the porch with a date 1621. The Cadw listing record describes the farm as "exceptionally interesting with only minor alterations since 1621". It remains the private farmhouse to a working farm.

== Architecture and description ==
The architectural historian John Newman describes the farmhouse as; "largely single-storeyed, consisting of two parts. Sir Cyril Fox and Lord Raglan, in the first of their three-volume study Monmouthshire Houses, give a plan showing the typical hall house layout. Peter Smith, in his study Houses of the Welsh Countryside, records Blaengavenny as an example of a half timbered house, a type relatively rare in Wales and generally located, as here, proximate to the England–Wales border. The farmhouse is Grade II* listed, with its barn and granary having separate, Grade II listings.
