= Pen-y-clawdd Farmhouse, Raglan =

Pen-y-clawdd Farmhouse
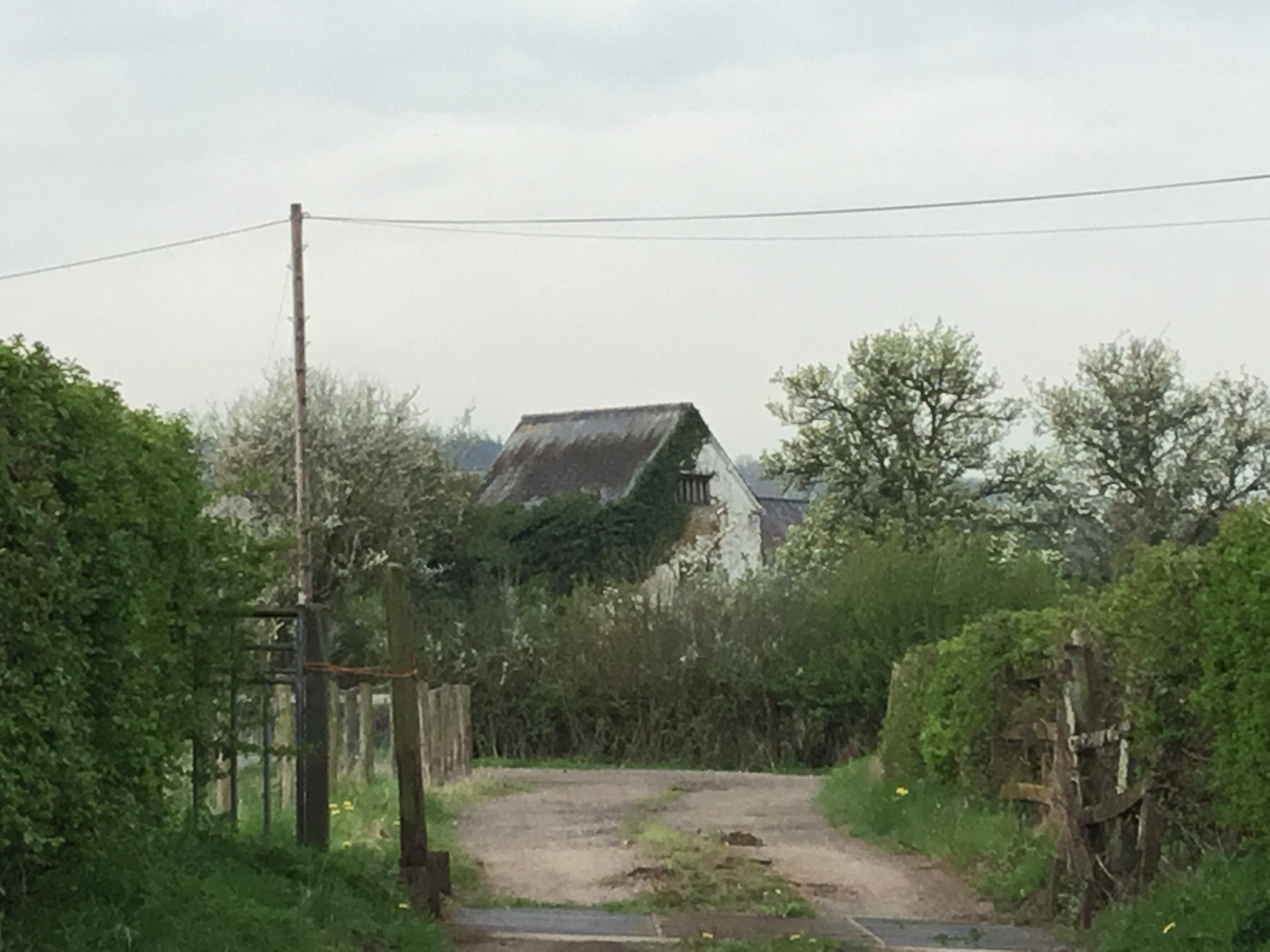
- "a substantial 17th century house of the minor gentry"

- Location within Monmouthshire
- 51.7706°N 2.8136°W
- Type: Farmhouse
- Location: Raglan, Monmouthshire

History
- Built: late 17th century

Site notes
- Architectural style: Vernacular
- Governing body: Privately owned

Listed Building – Grade II*
- Official name: Pen-y-clawdd Farmhouse
- Designated: 19 November 1953
- Reference no.: 2099

Listed Building – Grade II
- Official name: Barn at Pen-y-clawdd Farm
- Designated: 31 January 2001
- Reference no.: 24721

Pen-y-clawdd Farmhouse, Raglan, Monmouthshire is a gentry house dating from the early 17th century. Owned by the Bradburys, High Sheriffs of Monmouthshire, and later by the Williams family and then the Prichards of Penallt, it remains a privately owned farmhouse. The building is Grade II* listed.

== History ==
Sir Cyril Fox and Lord Raglan, in their three-volume guide Monmouthshire Houses, give building dates for the house from 1600 to 1680. Cadw suggests a longer construction period, from the mid-16th to the early 18th centuries. The owners in the 18th century were the Bradburys, High Sheriffs of Monmouthshire, "whose extravagant living ruined the estate". During the Bradbury's tenure, the Swearing Room in the house was used as a courtroom. The farm subsequently had a number of owners from the Monmouthshire gentry and remains the working farmhouse of a privately owned farm.

== Architecture and description ==
The architectural historian John Newman describes Pen-y-clawdd as "a well-preserved farmhouse demonstrating the typical improvements of a family going up in the world". The building is of whitewashed rubble and constructed to a height of two storeys with attics. The interior includes the panelled Swearing Room, and an upper chamber with a fireplace decorated with Delft tiles depicting Biblical scenes. The farmhouse has a Grade II* listing, its listing describing it as "a substantial 17th century house of the minor gentry". The farm's large, red-brick and timber barn has a separate Grade II listing. Fox and Raglan give a date for the barn of the late 17th century.
