= Pwllyrhwyad, Llanarth =

Pwllyrhwyad
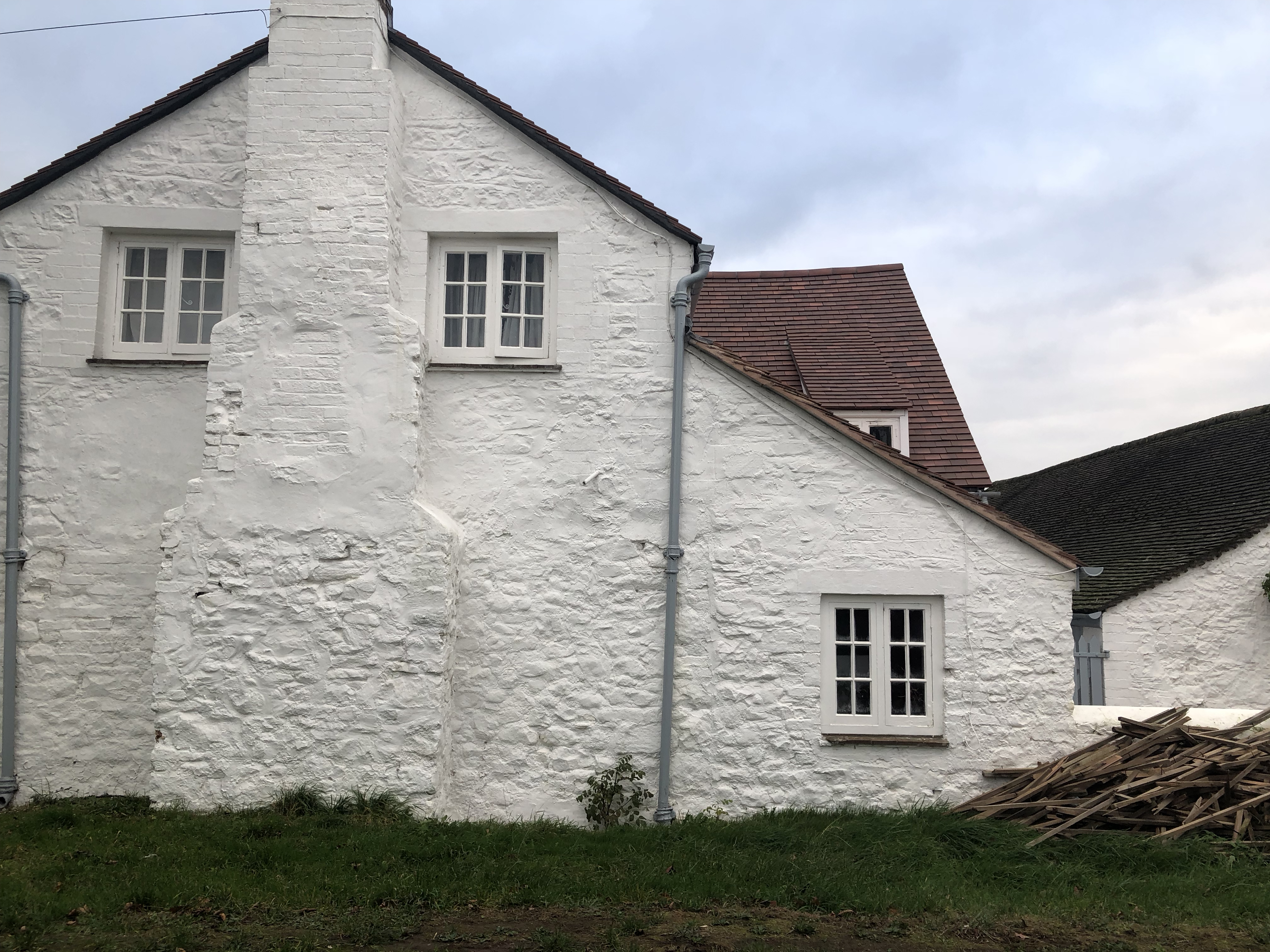
- "a well-preserved late medieval cottage"

- Location within Monmouthshire
- 51.7923°N 2.9249°W
- Type: House
- Location: Llanarth, Monmouthshire

History
- Built: 16th century and later

Site notes
- Architectural style: vernacular
- Governing body: Privately owned

Listed Building – Grade II*
- Official name: Pwllyrhwyad
- Designated: 15 March 2000
- Reference no.: 23102

Pwllyrhwyad, Llanarth, Monmouthshire is a cottage dating from the 16th century with some later additions. It is a Grade II* listed building.

== History and description ==
Cadw date the original house to the 16th century, with additions in the following three centuries. Sir Cyril Fox and Lord Raglan, in their three-volume study Monmouthshire Houses, describe Pwllyrhwyad, which they call "Pwll-y-hwaid", as originally a "three-bayed wooden hall" but noted that, by the time of their survey in the mid-20th century, "only a portion survives". The house is of a timber-frame construction, with infilled, whitewashed rubble.

In the 19th century, the cottage was part of the Llanover and Coldbrook Estate. The house, which remains a private residence, is Grade II* listed, its listing record describing it as a "well-preserved late medieval cottage".
