= Little Pitt Cottage =

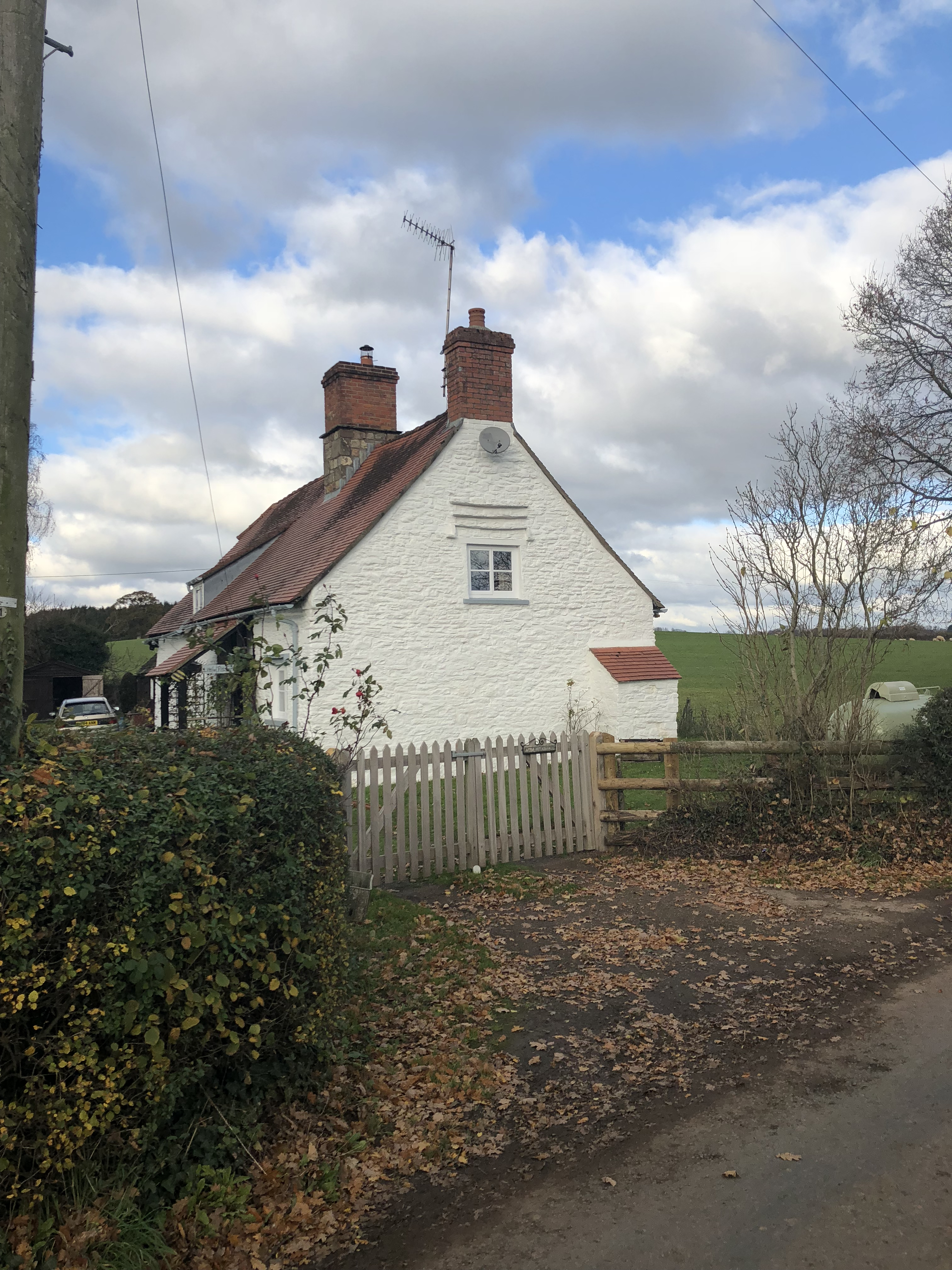
- "a fine and exceptionally intact small timber-framed house"

- Location within Monmouthshire
- 51.7844°N 2.9162°W
- Type: medieval house
- Location: Monmouthshire, Wales
- OS grid reference: SO 3689 0992

History
- Built: mid 16th century

Listed Building – Grade II*
- Official name: Little Pitt Cottage
- Designated: 9 January 1956
- Reference no.: 1974
- Community: Llanarth

Little Pitt Cottage is a medieval house in Llanarth, Monmouthshire, South Wales. It was designated a Grade II* listed building in 1956, its listing record describing it as a "fine and exceptionally intact timber-framed house".

== History and description ==
The house has a cruck trussed gable, with an exposed timber frame and four monumental centred doorways, modified to form a three-unit plan in the 17th century. The architectural historian John Newman describes the cottage as "the most completely surviving cruck-truss hall house in the county". The windows have timber lintels under a painted stone dripmould. The ends of beams for the inserted hall floor are visible. Sir Cyril Fox and Lord Raglan, in the first of their three-volume history of vernacular architecture Monmouthshire Houses, give a detailed description of the cottage, with plans and illustrations. Peter Smith, in his work, Houses of the Welsh Countryside, describes Little Pitt as "a good example" of the hall house plan.

The house was, and remains, part of the Llanarth estate and is Grade II* listed.

== Sources ==
- Fox, Cyril; Raglan, Lord (1994). Medieval Houses. Monmouthshire Houses. Vol. 1. Cardiff: Merton Priory Press Ltd & The National Museum of Wales. ISBN 9780720003963. OCLC 916186124.
- Newman, John (2000). Gwent/Monmouthshire. The Buildings of Wales. London: Penguin. ISBN 0-14-071053-1.
- Smith, Peter (1988). Houses of the Welsh Countryside. London: Her Majesty's Stationery Office. ISBN 9-78011-300012-8.
