= Great Killough =

- Cil-Llwch Mawr (Welsh)
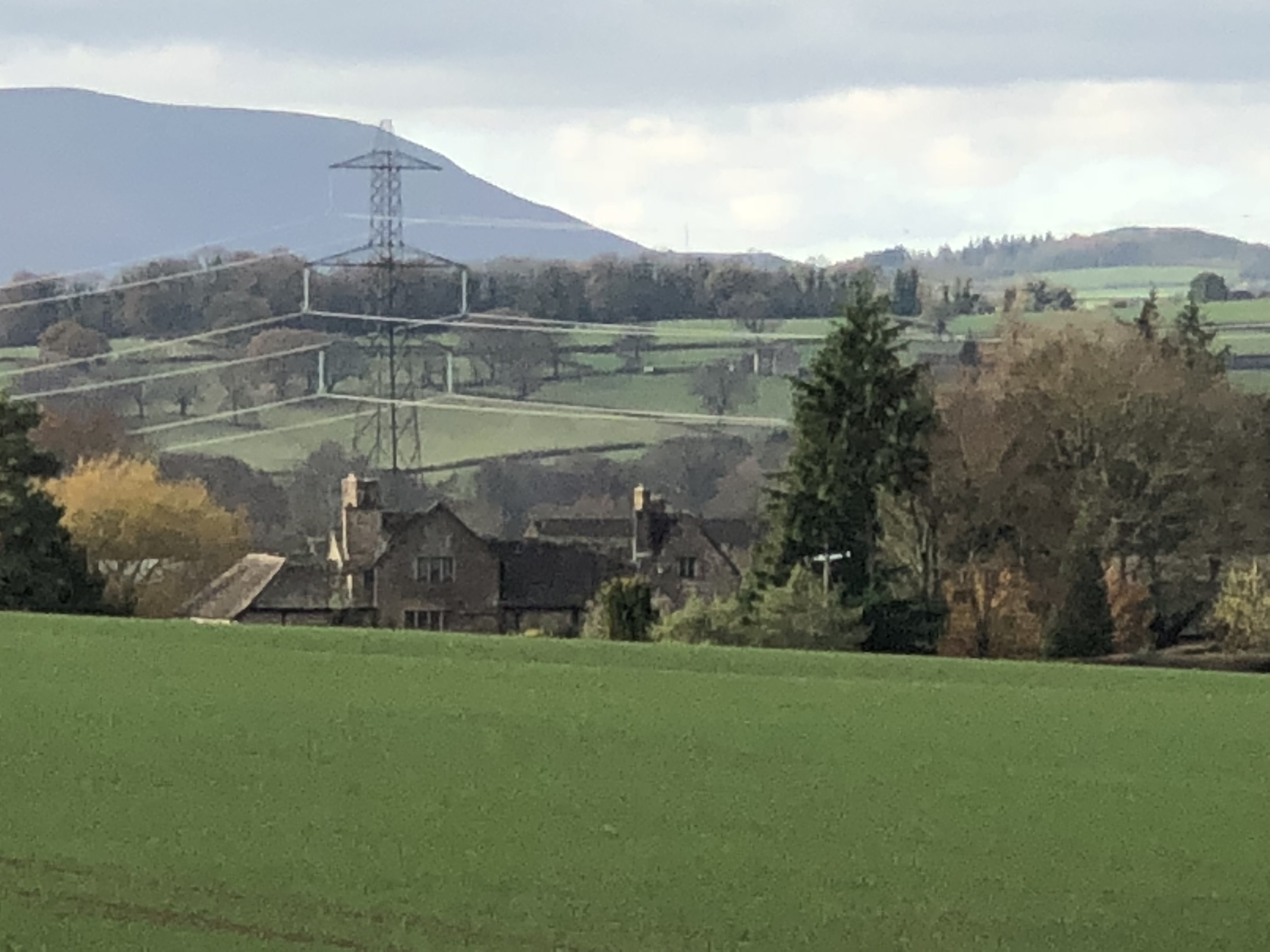
- "a full-scale late medieval hall"

- Location within Monmouthshire
- 51.8211°N 2.8975°W
- Type: Manor house
- Location: Llantilio Crossenny, Monmouthshire

History
- Built: mid-17th century

Site notes
- Architectural style: Vernacular
- Governing body: Privately owned

Listed Building – Grade II*
- Official name: Great Killough
- Designated: 1 May 1952
- Reference no.: 2056

Great Killough, Llantilio Crossenny, Monmouthshire is a substantial manor house of late medieval origins. Most of the current structure dates from three building periods between 1600 and 1670. It is a Grade II* listed building.

== History ==
The site of the house is ancient and Cadw describes the original building as late medieval. Sir Cyril Fox and Lord Raglan, in the third of their three-volume study, Monmouthshire Houses, date the present house to three periods of building, 1600, 1630 and 1670. Peter Smith, in his study, Houses of the Welsh Countryside, notes Great Killough as a fine example of the hall house type. Coflein records the existence of a "panelled attic" which may have served as a chapel. The architectural historian John Newman notes the extensive restoration carried out in 1963–1964. The house remains privately owned.

== Architecture and description ==
Cadw records Great Killough as a "substantial H-plan mansion". It is built of Old red sandstone rubble with some ashlar dressings and a stone-tiled roof. The four-bay great hall is a "remarkable" "rarity". Great Killough is a Grade II* listed building.
