= The Cwm, Llantrisant, Monmouthshire =

The Cwm
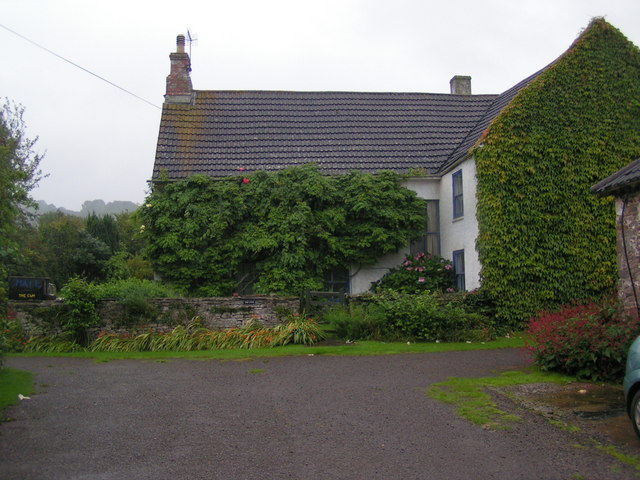
- "a substantial farmhouse of distinctive T-plan"

- Location within Monmouthshire
- 51.6703°N 2.8756°W
- Type: Farmhouse
- Location: Llantrisant, Monmouthshire

History
- Built: 16th century

Site notes
- Architectural style: Vernacular
- Governing body: Privately owned

Listed Building – Grade II*
- Official name: The Cwm
- Designated: 4 March 1952
- Reference no.: 2710

The Cwm, Llantrisant, Monmouthshire is a farmhouse dating from the 16th century. Expanded in both the 17th and 18th centuries, The Cwm is a Grade II* listed building, its listing describing it as "a substantial farmhouse of distinctive T-plan".

== History and description ==
Sir Cyril Fox and Lord Raglan, in their three-volume guide Monmouthshire Houses, give an original construction date of the late 16th century, with the roof of the main Tudor block dating from 1600. They ascribe the wing to the South to the early 17th and 18th centuries, with Cadw ascribing the North wing to the same 18th century building phase. Fox and Raglan consider the style of the structure indicates a national, rather than a regional, influence. The architectural historian John Newman notes the stone window frames, with recessed spandrels and arched windows, which he considers "most unusual". Nothing is known of the builders or early owners. By the 1840s, the farmhouse was part of the Monmouthshire estates of the Dukes of Beaufort and was let to a William Blower, along with 104 acres (42 ha) of land. The house remains in private ownership and is Grade II* listed.

Built over 200 years, the house is of a T-plan design, with a central block and two wings. Constructed of whitewashed rubble to a height of two storeys, the roofs have been replaced with modern tiles.

== Sources ==
- Fox, Cyril; Raglan, Lord (1994). Sub-Medieval Houses c.1550–1610. Monmouthshire Houses. Vol. 2. Cardiff: Merton Priory Press Ltd & The National Museum of Wales. ISBN 0952000989. OCLC 277251975.
- Newman, John (2000). Gwent/Monmouthshire. The Buildings of Wales. London: Penguin. ISBN 0-14-071053-1.
