= High Sheriff of Gwent =

Welsh county ceremonial officer

The office of High Sheriff of Gwent was established in 1974 under section 219 of the Local Government Act 1972, replacing the shrievalty of Monmouthshire.

== List of Sheriffs ==
- 1974 Colonel Christopher Eustace Hill, of Brynderi, Llantilio Crossenny, Abergavenny.
- 1975 Charles Frederick Griffin, of Newton Court, Monmouth.
- 1976 Ronald Vivian Courtney Jones, of Pen-y-parc House, Llantarnam, Newport
- 1977 Richard Hanbury-Tenison, of Clytha Park, Abergavenny
- 1978 Major Patrick John Ronald Waller, of Hadnock Court, Monmouth.
- 1979 Squadron-Leader Michael Taylor Harding-Rolls, of Rockfield Farm, Rockfield, Monmouth.
- 1980 Alfred Joseph Gooding, of Firbank House, Glasllwch View, Newport.
- 1981 Thomas Robb Coughtrie, of Winstone Thrieve, Llanvetherine, Abergavenny.
- 1982 Christopher Samuel Inglefield, of Bryngwyn Manor, Raglan
- 1983 John Frazer Ingledew, of Great Killough, Llantilio Crossenny, Abergavenny.
- 1984 Thomas Robert Baxter-Wright, of Castle Hill House, Monmouth.
- 1985 Michael John Marshal Clarke, of Osbaston House, Monmouth
- 1986 Colin Hughes Davies, of Oakgrove, St Arvans, Chepstow.
- 1987 Lieutenant-Colonel Geoffrey David Inkin, of Court St. Lawrence, Llangovan, Monmouth
- 1988 Major-General Lennox Alexander Hawkins Napier, of Osbaston Farm, Monmouth.
- 1989 Philip Arnold Bown, of Uplands, Itton, Chepstow.
- 1990 Alun Thomas Beverley-Jones, of Gaer Hill Farm, St. Arvans, Chepstow.
- 1991 James Frederic Whigham McConnel, of White House, Newcastle, Monmouth.
- 1992 Christopher Allan Harding-Rolls, of Pwll-y-cwm, The Hendre, Monmouth.
- 1993 Simon Hugh Patrick Boyle
- 1994 Samuel Anthony John Pierre Bosanquet, of Dingestow Court, Dingestow, Monmouth.
- 1995 Richard John Cleeve, of High House, Penrhos, Monmouthshire, Raglan.
- 1996 lan Francis Donald of Rockfield Farm, Rockfield, Monmouth.
- 1997 Andrew Murray Kerr, of Glebe House, Llanfair Kilgeddin, Abergavenny.
- 1998 Robert Longueville Dean, of The Garn Fawr, Tredunnock, Caerleon.
- 1999 Julia Clare Johnson, of Llanvihangel Court, Llanvihangel, near Abergavenny
- 2000 Brigadier John Hedley Hooper, of The Gables, The Parade, Monmouth.
- 2001 John Wardlaw Hanbury Tenison, of Bettws, Clytha Hill, Raglan, Monmouthshire
- 2002 William Neville Waters, of Pen-y-Banc Uchaf Farm, Ponthir, Caerleon.
- 2003 David Selby Milner of Llanddewi House, Llanddewi Skirrid, Abergavenny
- 2004 Brian Watkins, of Hardwick Hill House, Hardwick Hill, Chepstow
- 2005 Commodore Tobin Elliott
- 2006 Audrey Elizabeth Hull
- 2007 Michael John Howard Harry
- 2008 Judith Elizabeth Child of Caerphilly
- 2009 Stephen James Brindley Hughes of Monmouth
- 2010 Wilfred Hugh Phillips, of Crosskeys, Newport
- 2011 Lady Hayman Joyce of Pontypool
- 2012 Helen Elizabeth Murray of Llanover, Abergavenny
- 2013 Murray Alexander MacFarlane of Pen-y-Clawdd
- 2014 Gillian Ann Sheddick, of Redwick, Newport
- 2015 Lieutenant Colonel Andrew Simon Tuggey of Craig-y-Dorth, Cwmcarvan, Monmouthshire
- 2016 Anthony John Clay of Nantyderry, Abergavenny
- 2017 John Kevin Lynn Thomas of Monmouth
- 2018 Sharon Evelyn Lesley Linnard of Newport
- 2019 Dame Claire Elizabeth Clancy Monkswood, Usk
- 2020 Timothy Mark Sinclair Russen of Monmouth
- 2021 Philip Martin Alderman of Ponthir, Newport
- 2022 Malgwyn Davies, of Croesyceiliog, Cwmbran
- 2023 Professor Simon John Gibson, of Manson, Monmouth
- 2024 Helen Mifflin, of Newport
- 2025: Lieutenant-Colonel Ralph Radclyffe David Griffin, of Monmouth
- 2026: Shereen Williams, of Newport

== See also ==
- High Sheriff of Monmouthshire
