= Little Llwygy Farmhouse, Cwmyoy =

Little Llwygy Farmhouse
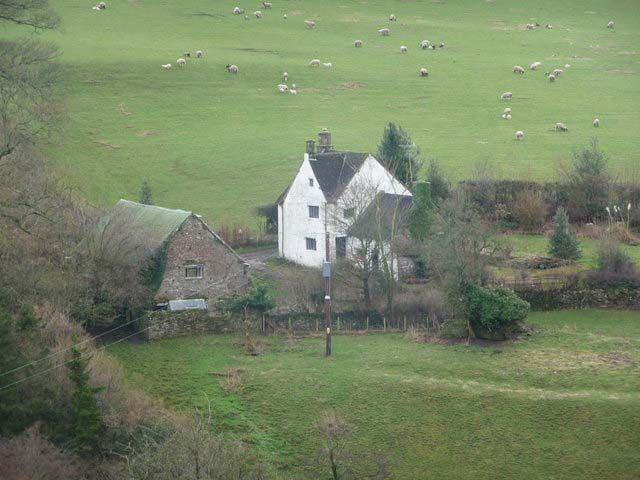
- "High up and lonely on the hillside"

- Location within Monmouthshire
- 51.8932°N 2.9936°W
- Type: Farmhouse
- Location: Cwmyoy, Monmouthshire, Wales

History
- Built: c.15/16th Centuries

Site notes
- Architectural style: Vernacular
- Governing body: Privately owned

Listed Building – Grade II*
- Official name: Little Llwygy Farmhouse
- Designated: 9 January 1956
- Reference no.: 1936

Little Llwygy Farmhouse, Cwmyoy, Monmouthshire, Wales, is a farmhouse of two building dates, the earlier of the 15th century, the latter of the 17th. The farmhouse is a Grade II* listed building.

== History ==
The origin of the farmhouse is late-medieval, possibly the early 15th century. In their three-volume history, Monmouthshire Houses, Sir Cyril Fox and Lord Raglan described it as "the only example of a mediaeval one-roomed house open to the roof in Monmouthshire". The building was extended in the 17th century, possibly around 1610, by the construction of a larger, two-storey, block. Coflein suggests that the original wing was demoted to the status of a service wing at this time. The farmhouse was listed Grade II* in 1956. In 2012, the house was on the market for £425,000.

== Architecture and description ==
John Newman, in his Gwent/Monmouthshire volume of the Pevsner Buildings of Wales series, describes Little Llwygy’s setting; “high up and lonely on the hillside”. The earlier block consists of a single room, constructed in stone. It contains a "splendid" fireplace. This structure is now used for storage. The 16th century extension, also in Old Red Sandstone, is two-storeyed with an attic.
