= High House, Penrhos, Monmouthshire =

High House
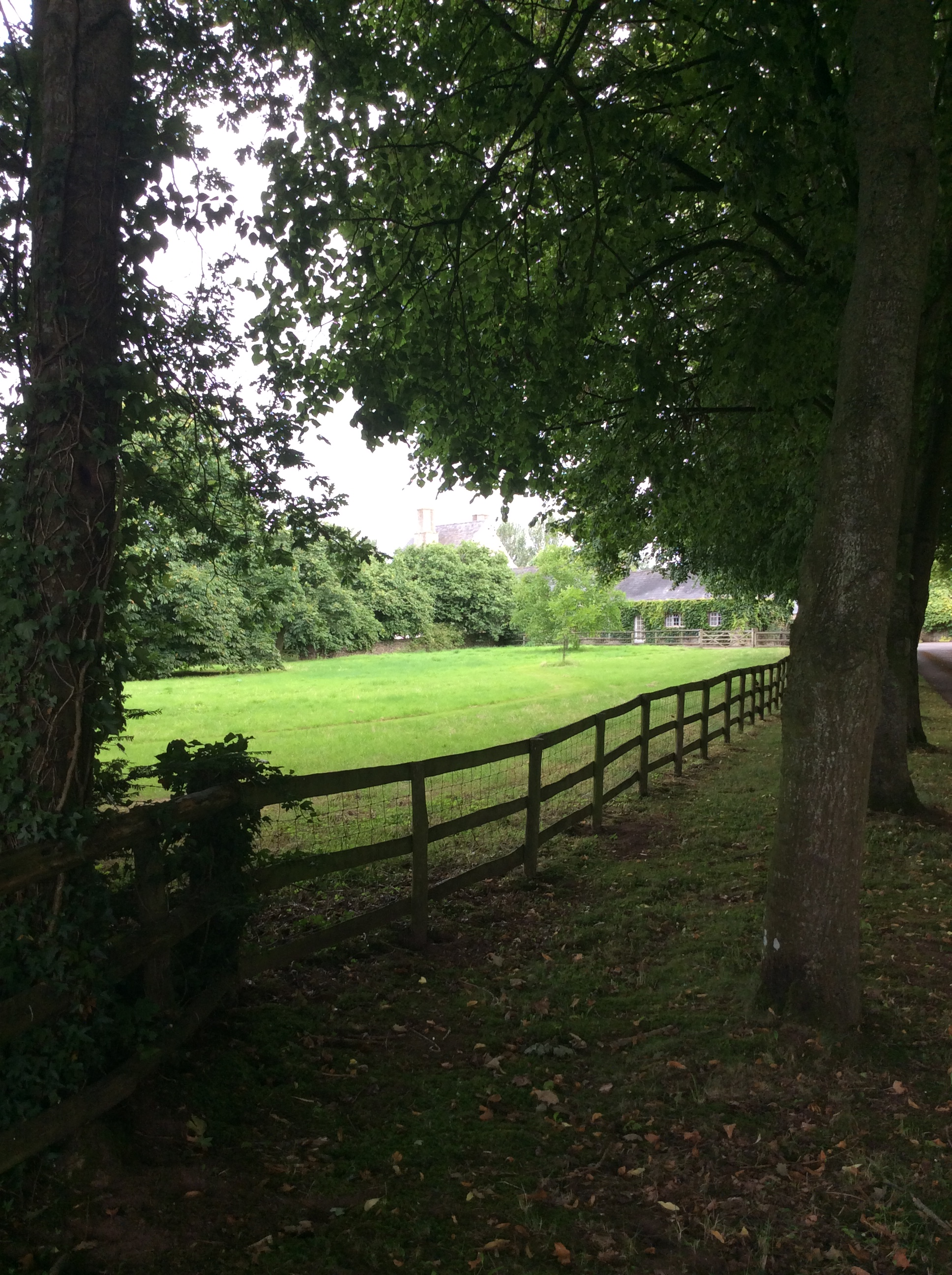
- "Important Renaissance house of 1675"

- Location within Monmouthshire
- 51.8041°N 2.8594°W
- Type: House
- Location: Penrhos, Monmouthshire

History
- Built: 17th century

Site notes
- Architectural style: Renaissance

Listed Building – Grade II*
- Official name: High House
- Designated: 27 October 2000
- Reference no.: 24322

High House, Penrhos, Monmouthshire is an important Renaissance house dating from the 17th century. Its style, with its exceptionally high roofline, is unique in Monmouthshire. It is a Grade II* listed building.

== History and description ==
High House is of two storeys with attics set in a very elevated roof.The house is of rubble covered with painted render and the roof tiling is modern. In their three-volume history, Monmouthshire Houses, Fox and Raglan wrote of the "striking and symmetrical elevation, the high roof-ridge and tall chimneys no doubt the reason for its name". The architectural historian John Newman described High House as "a bizarre hybrid, of unforgettable silhouette". Its Cadw listing records it as “an important Renaissance house of 1675”, and the Royal Commission on the Ancient and Historical Monuments of Wales notes that its design, with its elevated roofline is “unique in Monmouthshire”.

The house is privately owned. The gardens are occasionally opened under the National Gardens Scheme.
