= Howell's House, Grosmont =

Howell's House
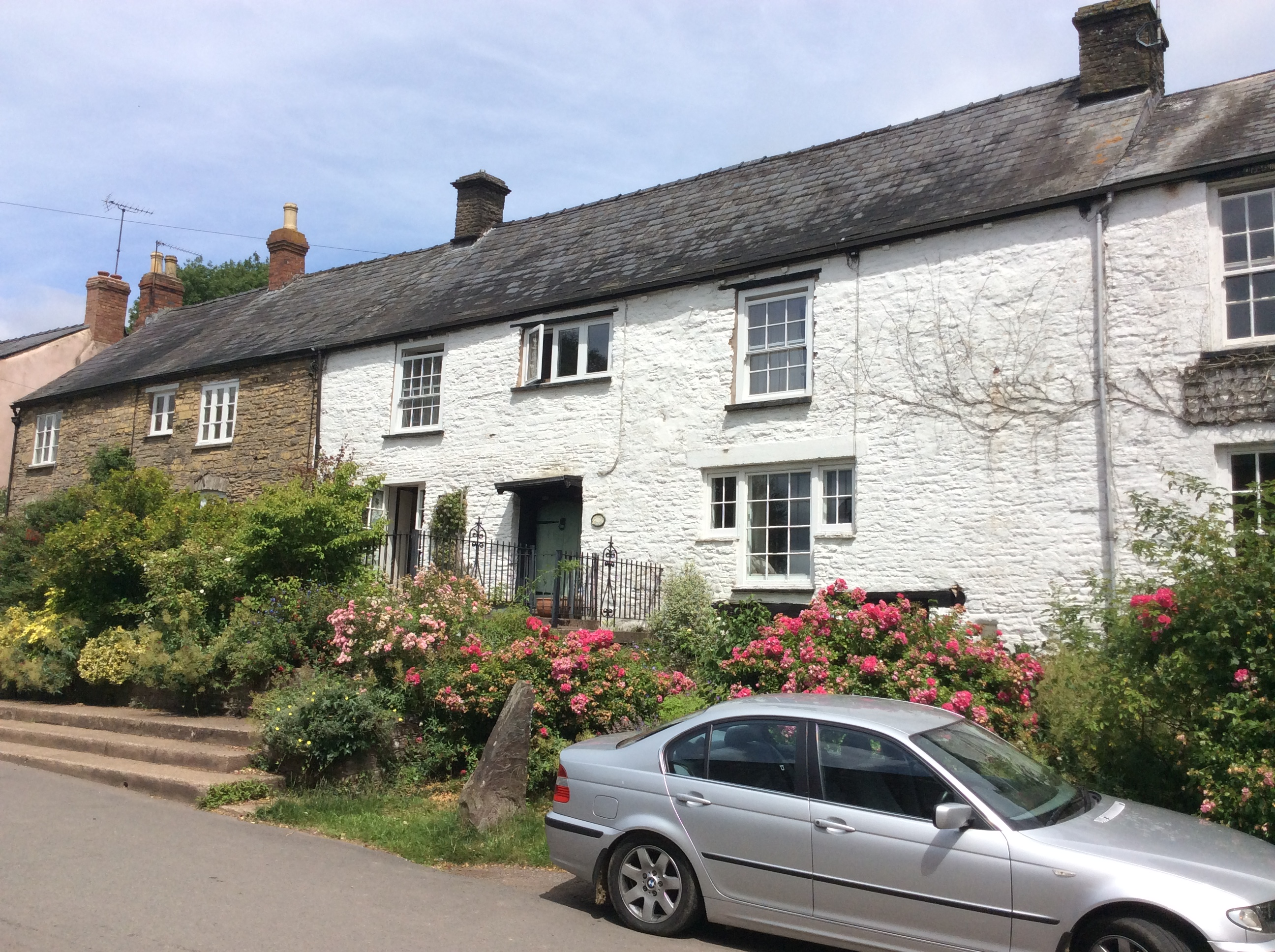
- "an unusually well-preserved 17th century house"

- Location within Monmouthshire
- 51.9149°N 2.8671°W
- Type: House
- Location: Grosmont, Monmouthshire

History
- Built: early 17th century

Site notes
- Architectural style: Vernacular
- Governing body: Privately owned

Listed Building – Grade II*
- Official name: Howell's House
- Designated: 19 October 2000
- Reference no.: 24134

Howell's House, Grosmont, Monmouthshire is an early 17th century house. Previously known as The Shop, it served as a village stores from the mid-19th century in the 1980s. Now a private residence, it is a Grade II* listed building.

== History ==
The house dates from the early 17th century. The door case carries the date 1611 and the initials HP, said to be those of Howell Prichard, the builder of the house. Alterations were made in the early 19th and in the 20th centuries. A commercial premises for over 100 years until the 1980s, Sir Cyril Fox and Lord Raglan refer to the house as "The Shop" in their three-volume guide Monmouthshire Houses. The house is now a private residence.

== Architecture and description ==
The house is of stone, with a white render. The architectural historian John Newman noted the "heavy timber door-frame dated 1611". The interior is well-preserved and the attic contains "exceptionally unusual and rare fragments of 17th century decorative plasterwork". The building is Grade II* listed.
