= St Martin's Church, Pen-y-clawdd =

Coordinates: 51.7669°N 2.7943°W

Church of St Martin, Pen-y-clawdd
- Church of St Martin
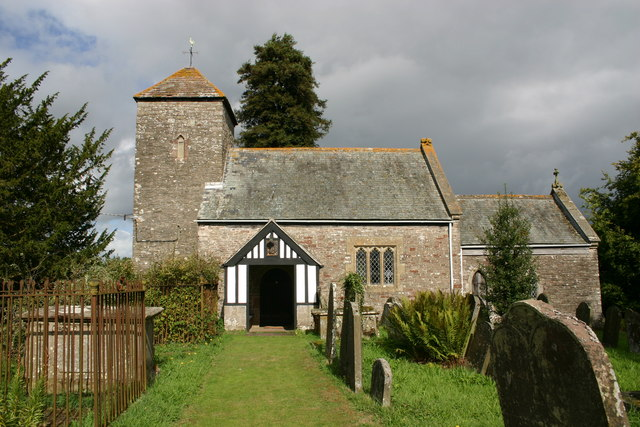
- "a medieval church with fine barrel roofs"

- Location in Monmouthshire
- Location: Pen-y-clawdd, Monmouthshire
- Country: Wales
- Denomination: Church in Wales

History
- Status: parish church
- Founded: C15th century

Architecture
- Functional status: Active
- Heritage designation: Grade II*
- Designated: 27 November 1953
- Architectural type: Church

Administration
- Diocese: Monmouth
- Archdeaconry: Monmouth
- Deanery: Monmouth
- Parish: Llangovan with Penyclawdd

Clergy
- Vicar: The Reverend G J R Williams

The Church of St Martin, Pen-y-clawdd, Monmouthshire, Wales is a parish church with Norman origins which was rebuilt in the 15th century. It is located on the site of an early Welsh defensive earthwork. The church was restored in 1884–85. It remains an active church in the parish of Llangovan with Pen-y-clawdd. It is a Grade II* listed building.

== History ==
The church dates from the Norman period but is located on the site of an earlier earthworks. The present building was constructed in the late 15th or early 16th centuries. The church was restored in the Victorian period by Henry Prothero. The church remains an active parish church.

== Architecture and description ==
The building is of Old Red Sandstone rubble with slate roofs. The church comprises a nave, chancel, and tower with a pyramidal roof.

During the Victorian restoration, a stone coffin lid of the medieval period was discovered. It is carved in relief with a Greek cross and is now on display in the chancel. Cadw describes it as of the 14th century, while the architectural historian John Newman attributes it to the late 13th century and notes, "It must once have been a fine thing". The church is a Grade II* listed building, its listing recording the "fine barrel roofs" dating from the 15th century.
