= Juok =

God of some tribes on the Nile, Sudan

Juok is the name of the most high creator God for the tribes on the upper reaches of the Nile. For some including the Shilluk, Dinka and Nuer, Luo he is the Creator God and is omnipresent. Nyikang, a legendary king, is often invoked as an intermediary especially by the Shilluk. Other Nilotic tribes, for example the Acholi and Lango, use the possibly related term Jok only for local and/or ancestral spirits.
