= Pen-y-clawdd =

Coordinates: 51.76528°N 2.79548°W

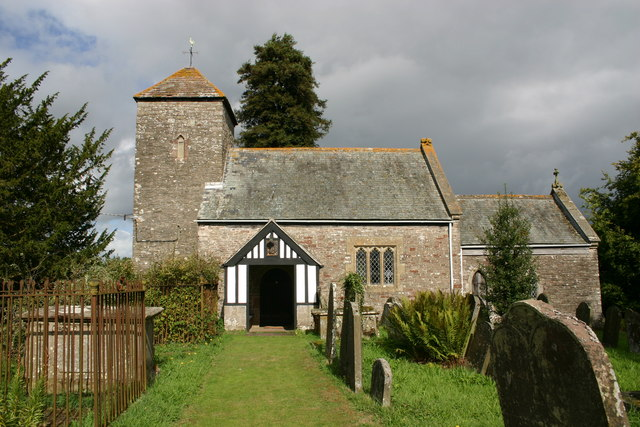
- Church of St Martin, Pen-y-clawdd

- Location within Monmouthshire
- Principal area: Monmouthshire
- Preserved county: Gwent
- Country: Wales
- Sovereign state: United Kingdom
- Police: Gwent
- Fire: South Wales
- Ambulance: Welsh
- UK Parliament: Monmouth
- Senedd Cymru – Welsh Parliament: Monmouth

Pen-y-clawdd is a village in Monmouthshire, south east Wales, situated between Raglan and Monmouth. The village is the site of a medieval fortification and there is a historic church with an ancient cross in the churchyard which is a scheduled monument.

== Location ==
Pen-y-clawdd is located about two miles east of Raglan and five miles southwest of Monmouth, on the unclassified road leading from Usk to Monmouth, and to the east of the A449 trunk road.

== History and amenities ==
The site of a possible medieval ringwork castle has been identified near the village at grid reference SO457073. Pen-y-clawdd was granted manorial status in 1349 when it was held by half a Knight's Fee by Walter de Kymbard from Lawrence de Hastings.

The Church of St Martin is the parish church. The church is constructed in a "mixture of Perpendicular and Decorated" styles and is a Grade II* listed building as of 27 November 1953. The churchyard contains a churchyard cross which is a scheduled monument. The church consists of a chancel, nave, porch and a tower with a stone roof. There is a stained glass east window. The register dates from 1727. The tower contains one bell, cast by Evans of Chepstow in 1793, with the inscription "Success to this City". A restoration took place in 1885-86 and a sepulchral slab, dated to the 14th century, was discovered. Additionally the tower was raised by about 8 feet (2.4 m), and the chancel benches, nave box pews and benches, two-decker pulpit and reading desk were all removed.

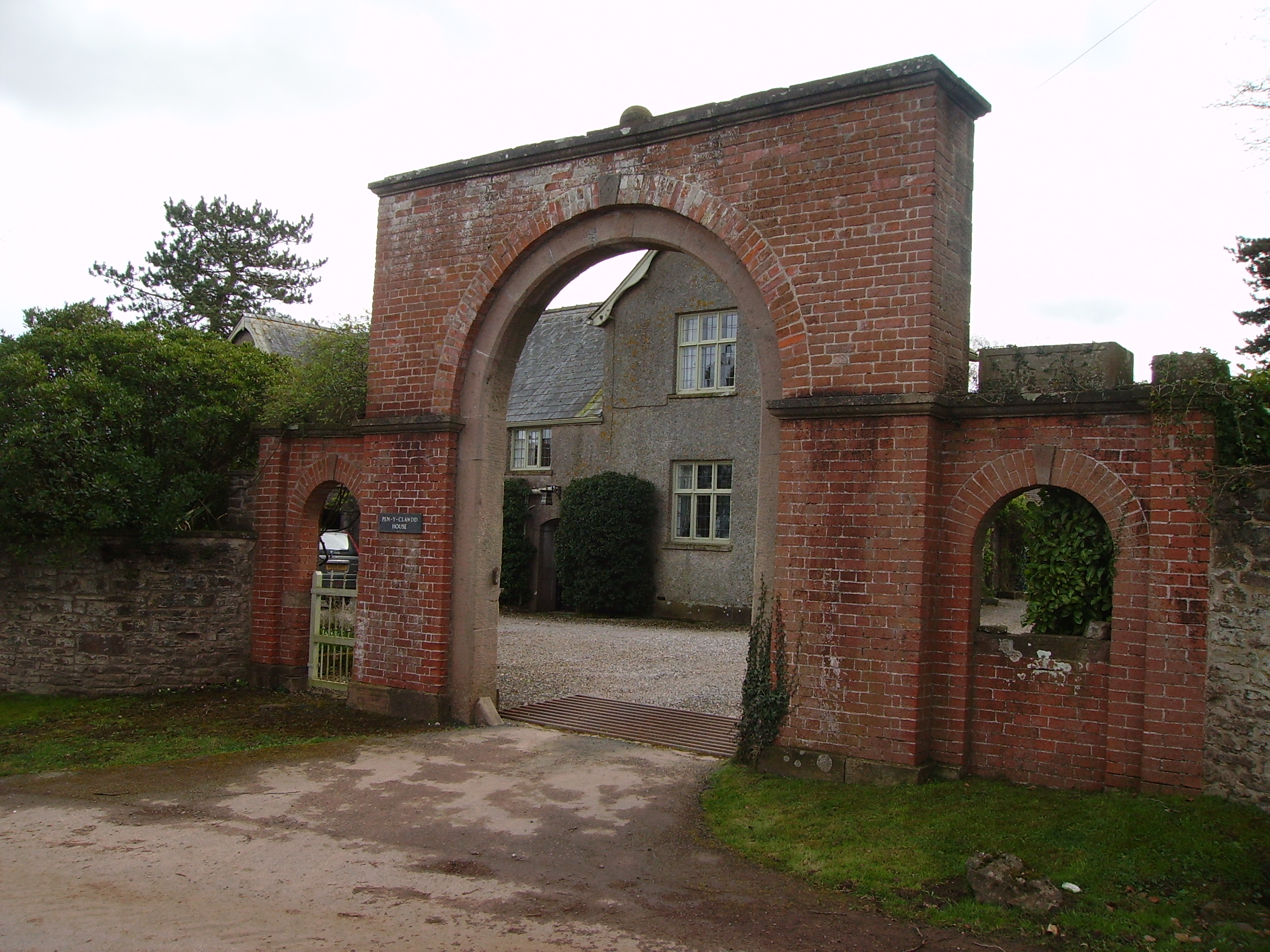
Gateway to Pen-y-clawdd House

Pen-y-clawdd House, a third of a mile south-east of the village, is described by Newman as "notable only for the plain but nobly scaled red brick arch, dated May 1861." The house is not listed but the range of outbuildings, including the 17th century barn, is listed Grade II.
