= Brynderi House, Llantilio Crossenny =

Brynderi House
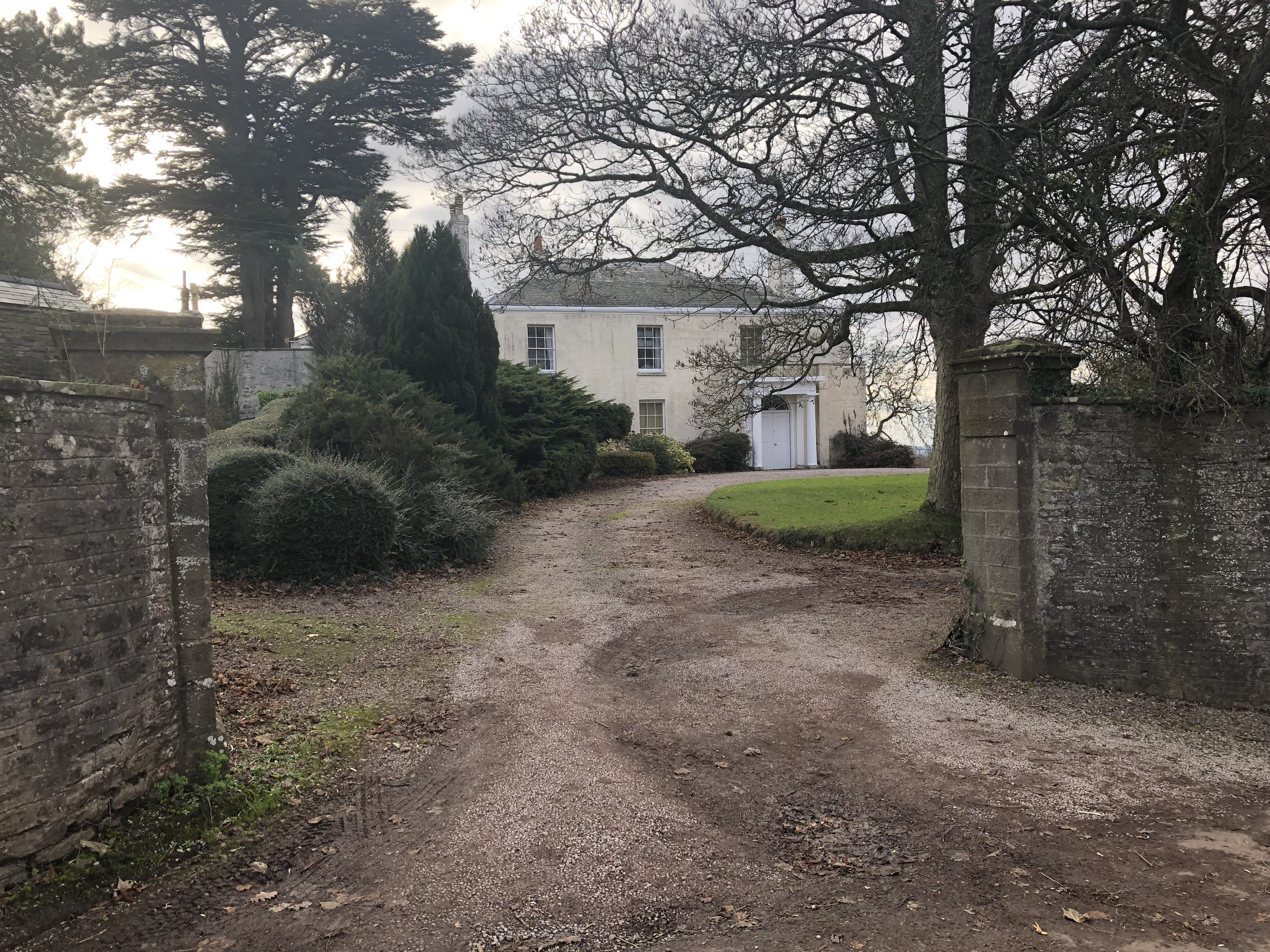

- Location within Monmouthshire
- 51.8505°N 2.8814°W
- Type: House
- Location: Llantilio Crossenny, Monmouthshire

History
- Built: 19th century

Site notes
- Architectural style: Regency

Listed Building – Grade II*
- Official name: Brynderi House
- Designated: 19 November 1953
- Reference no.: 2074

Brynderi House, in the hamlet of Brynderi, Llantilio Crossenny, Monmouthshire is a country house with origins in the mid-18th century. The house was extensively rebuilt in the early 19th century in a Regency style. In the later 19th century the house become the dower house for Llantilio Court. A Grade II* listed building, it remains a private residence.

== History and architecture ==
The service block to the house, dating from the mid-18th century, forms its earliest part. The Nicholas family, which owned the house from its construction, added a large villa at right angles to the service wing in the early 19th century. Joseph Bradney, in the Skenfrith volume of his multi-part A History of Monmouthshire from the Coming of the Normans into Wales down to the Present Time, records the house being owned at this time by a Dr. George Nicholas, and subsequently his son, Francis. Owners of a school in Ealing, they used Brynderi "as an occasional residence to which they used to resort in the holidays". Its name was changed to Belmont in the early 19th century, reverting to Brynderi on its purchase by a Colonel Clifford in 1854. The house was subsequently sold to the Jackson (later Mather Jackson) family of Llantilio Court, who used Brynderi as the dower house for the estate. Further extensions to the house were undertaken in 1895. The Gwent County Archive records the occupant in 1916 as "Gertrude Elizabeth Mather Jackson of Brynderi, near Abergavenny, spinster". The house is constructed in a Regency style, which is uncommon in Monmouthshire and the architect of the villa is unknown. The architect of the 1895 extension was A. E. Johnson of Abergavenny. Of stucco, the house is of two-storeys with attics and a Welsh slate roof. The porch is in a Doric style and the wrought-iron veranda is original. The staircase hall, and much of the interior, is largely intact. It remains a private residence and is a Grade II* listed building. Unusually for a building with such listed status, Brynderi is not mentioned in John Newman's Monmouthshire volume of the Pevsner Buildings of Wales. (Note: John Newman's only reference to Brynderi is to the Free Grammar School founded by James Powell.)

== Sources ==
- Bradney, Joseph (1991). A History of Monmouthshire: The Hundred of Skenfrith, Volume 1 Part 1. Academy Books. ISBN 1873361092. OCLC 669714197.
- Newman, John (2000). Gwent/Monmouthshire. The Buildings of Wales. London: Penguin. ISBN 0-14-071053-1.
