= Llansoy =

Village in Monmouthshire, Wales

Coordinates: 51.71858°N 2.80635°W

Llansoy: Welsh: Llan-soe
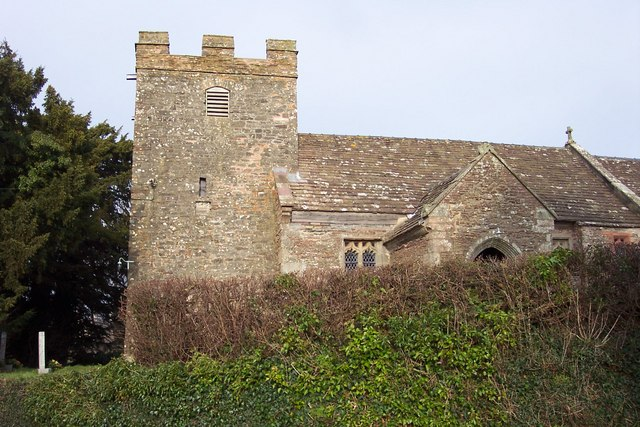
- Church of St. Tysoi at Llansoy

- Location within Monmouthshire
- OS grid reference: SO443025
- Principal area: Monmouthshire
- Preserved county: Gwent
- Country: Wales
- Sovereign state: United Kingdom
- Post town: USK
- Postcode district: NP15
- Dialling code: 01291
- Police: Gwent
- Fire: South Wales
- Ambulance: Welsh
- UK Parliament: Monmouth
- Senedd Cymru – Welsh Parliament: Monmouth

Llansoy (Welsh: Llan-soe) is a small village in Monmouthshire, south east Wales, United Kingdom, located about 3 miles (4.2 km) south east of Raglan.

== History ==
There is an Iron Age hillfort 1 mile (1.6 km) northwest of the village, at Great House, covering an area of about 5 acres (2 hectares) and overlooking the Olway Brook. Later, the area was reputedly settled by descendants of the Welsh king St. Brychan Brycheiniog.

== Church of St. Tysoi ==
The parish church is believed to have been founded around the 6th century. The dedication is to Tysoi of whom nothing is known, although he is thought to have been a pupil of St. Dyfrig. The church is largely built in the Perpendicular style of the 14th or 15th century, although the whole church was restored in 1858. The tower probably dates from the late 17th century.

== Amenities ==
The nearest pub, the Star Inn, is located about 1 mile (1.6 km) east of the village in the neighbouring parish of Llanfihangel Tor-y-Mynydd although its location is often given as Llansoy.
