= Monmouthshire Houses =

Three-volume study published 1951–1954

Monmouthshire Houses: A Study of Building Techniques and Smaller House-Plans in the Fifteenth to Seventeenth Centuries
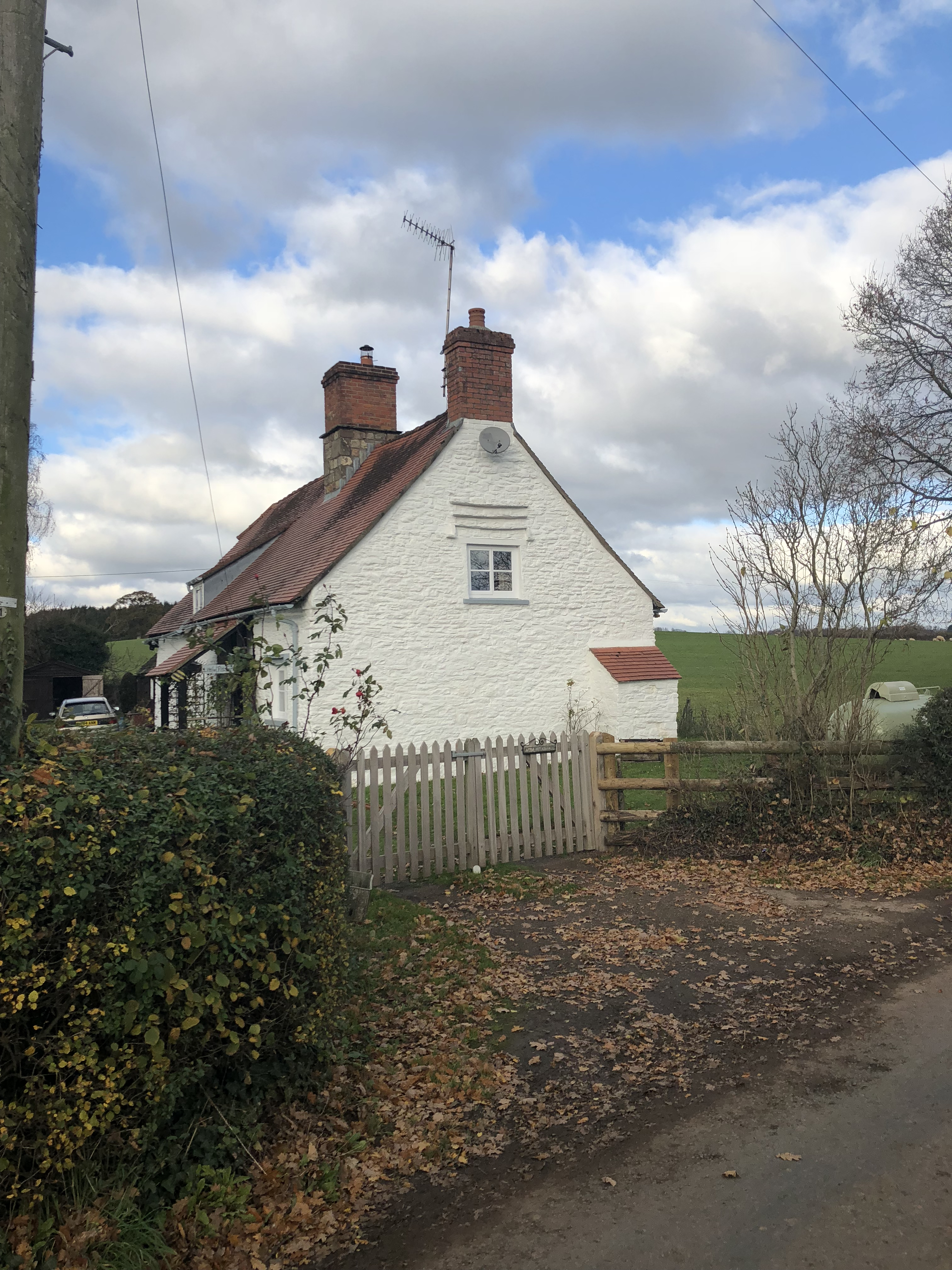
- Little Pitt Cottage, "the most completely surviving cruck-truss hall house in the county", was typical of the lesser Monmouthshire houses studied by Fox and Raglan.
- Composed of: Part I Medieval Houses (1951); Part II Sub-Medieval Houses, c. 1550–1610 (1953); Part III Renaissance Houses, c. 1590–1714 (1954)
- Author: Sir Cyril Fox & Lord Raglan
- Country: United Kingdom
- Language: English
- Genre: Architecture
- Publisher: National Museum of Wales
- Media type: Print (hardback)

Monmouthshire Houses: A Study of Building Techniques and Smaller House-Plans in the Fifteenth to Seventeenth Centuries is a study of buildings within the county of Monmouthshire written by Sir Cyril Fox and Lord Raglan and published by the National Museum of Wales. The study was published in three volumes; Part I Medieval Houses, Part II Sub-Medieval Houses, c. 1550–1610 and Part III Renaissance Houses, c. 1590–1714, between 1951 and 1954. The series was republished by Merton Priory Press in 1994. A later historian of Welsh architecture, Peter Smith, described Fox and Raglan’s work as equal in importance, in its own field, to Charles Darwin's On the Origin of Species.

== History ==
Sir Cyril Fox (1882–1967) was Director of the National Museum of Wales from 1926 to 1948. Fitzroy Somerset, Lord Raglan, the great-grandson of the 1st Lord Raglan, British Commander during the Crimean War, was a soldier, author and resident of Cefntilla Court in Monmouthshire. Raglan was also a Commissioner for Ancient Monuments in Wales and both he and Fox were pioneers of the study of vernacular architecture, being founder members of the Vernacular Architecture Group. From the early 1940s until 1949, Fox and Raglan undertook the most extensive survey of lesser Monmouthshire buildings ever undertaken. Raglan described their methodology in the introduction to the first volume, Medieval Houses, published in 1951. (Note: Amgueddfa Cymru – Museum Wales holds a collection of materials relating to the production of Monmouthshire Houses including some of Fox’s notebooks.) He would identify houses of interest and obtain the necessary permissions from owners, before calling in Fox to undertake a detailed survey. In the Introduction to the 1994 reprint, Peter Smith, author of Houses of the Welsh Countryside, recorded Raglan's approach; "as we travelled from farmhouse to farmhouse, I realised that his was a name that carried weight and in Monmouthshire opened every door...status and personal charm carried the day and we followed in his wake".

In the Introduction to Sub-Medieval Houses, the second volume of their history, Fox and Raglan record the genesis of the project. Wartime defensive precautions in 1941 led to a decision by the Ministry of Works to demolish an important farmhouse, Upper Wern-hir, near Llanbadoc. Fox and Raglan obtained permission to survey the building before its destruction and their investigations, together with the threats to Wern-hir and other, similar, buildings, convinced them of the need for a comprehensive survey of such structures throughout Monmouthshire. Working mainly at weekends, and funded by the National Museum, Fox and Raglan produced "the first truly comprehensive regional study of vernacular architecture in Britain". Some seventy years after the volumes were first published, Fox and Raglan's work is still cited by scholars. The architectural historian, John Newman, author of the Pevsner for Monmouthshire, considered their joint work as "ground-breaking, the single most important publication on any aspect of the county's buildings", and Smith described Monmouthshire Houses as "one of the most remarkable studies of vernacular architecture yet made in the British Isles", "a landmark, in its own field, as significant as Darwin's Origin of Species".

== Description ==
The three-volume work comprises detailed studies of over 400 houses and farmhouses built in Monmouthshire between the medieval period and 1714. The volumes are:

- Part I Medieval Houses (1951), OCLC 916186124; (reprinted 1994), ISBN 9780720003963
- Part II Sub-Medieval Houses, c. 1550–1610 (1953), OCLC 277251975; (reprinted 1994), ISBN 0952000989
- Part III Renaissance Houses, c. 1590–1714 (1954), OCLC 502362648; (reprinted 1994), ISBN 1898937001

== Sources ==
- Fox, Cyril; Raglan, Lord (1994a) [1951]. Medieval Houses. Monmouthshire Houses. Vol. 1. Cardiff: Merton Priory Press Ltd & The National Museum of Wales. ISBN 9780720003963. OCLC 916186124.
- —; —— (1994b) [1953]. Sub-Medieval Houses, c. 1550–1610. Monmouthshire Houses. Vol. 2. Cardiff: Merton Priory Press Ltd & The National Museum of Wales. ISBN 0952000989. OCLC 277251975.
- —; —— (1994c) [1954]. Renaissance Houses, c. 1590–1714. Monmouthshire Houses. Vol. 3. Cardiff: Merton Priory Press Ltd & The National Museum of Wales. ISBN 1898937001. OCLC 776066469.
- Hodges, Christopher George Leslie (2015). Derelict Stone Buildings of the Black Mountains Massif. Oxford: Archaeopress Publishing Ltd. ISBN 978-1-784-91150-8.
- Johnson, Matthew H. (2014). English Houses: 1300–1800. London: Routledge. ISBN 978-1-317-86864-4.
- Newman, John (2000). Gwent/Monmouthshire. The Buildings of Wales. London: Penguin. ISBN 0-14-071053-1.
- Saint George, Robert (2010). "Three Lives". In Dan Hicks; Mary C. Beaudry (eds.). The Oxford Handbook of Material Culture Studies. Oxford: Oxford University Press. ISBN 978-0-199-21871-4.
- Scott-Fox, Charles (2002). Cyril Fox: Archaeologist Extraordinary. Oxford: Oxbow Books. ISBN 978-1-8421-7080-9. OCLC 50176210.
- Smith, Peter (1975). Houses of the Welsh Countryside. London: Her Majesty's Stationery Office. ISBN 0-11-700475-8. OCLC 868639211.
