= FitzRoy Somerset, 4th Baron Raglan =

British soldier, anthropologist and peer (1885–1964)

The Right Honourable The Lord Raglan FRAI
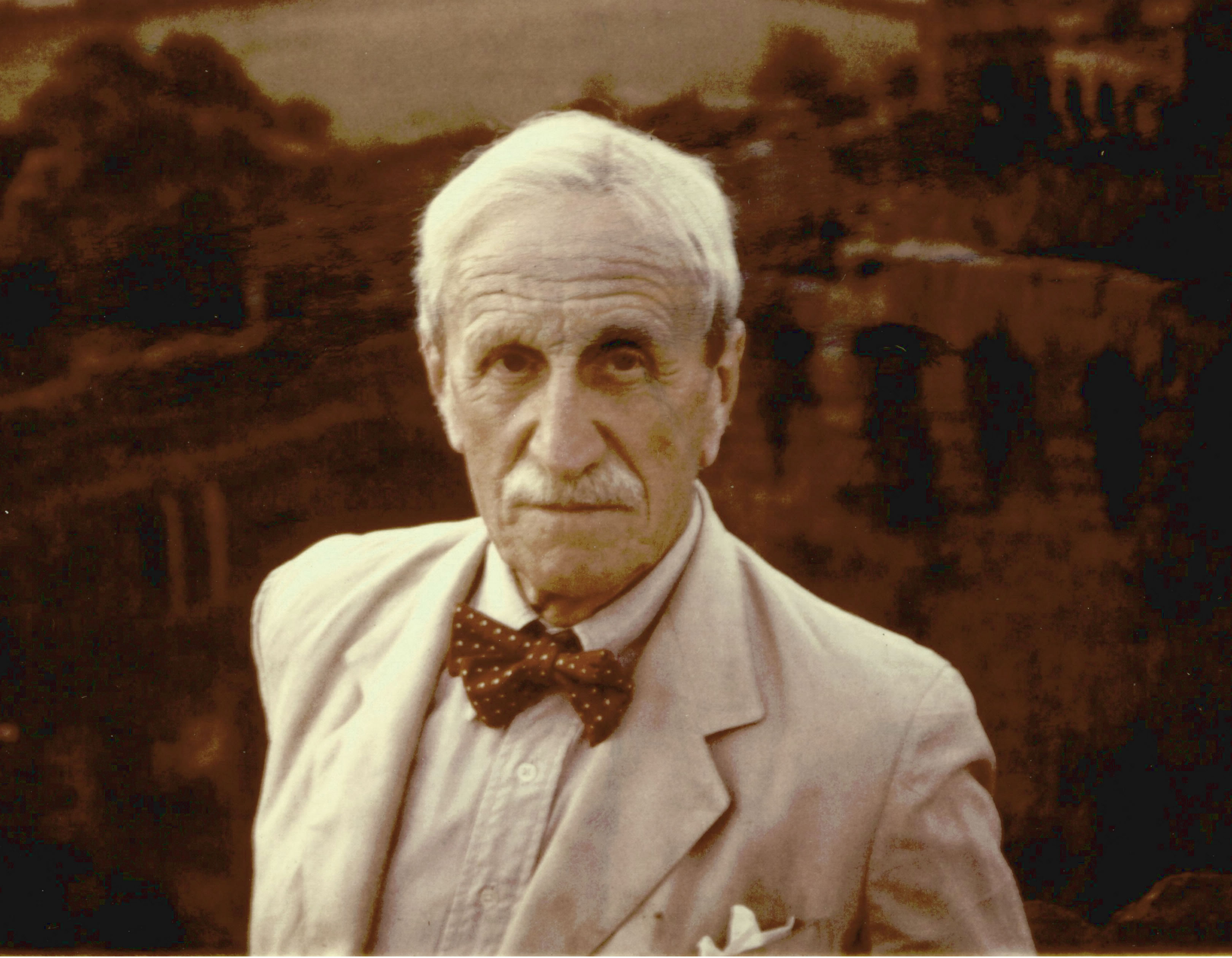
- Lord Raglan in front of Raglan Castle
- Predecessor: George Somerset, 3rd Baron Raglan
- Successor: FitzRoy John Somerset, 5th Baron Raglan
- Known for: Soldier; Author; Amateur Anthropologist
- Born: FitzRoy Richard Somerset; 10 June 1885; 12 Albert Mansions, Victoria Street, Westminster
- Died: 14 September 1964 (aged 79)
- Residence: Cefntilla Court
- Locality: Llandenny, Monmouthshire, Wales
- Spouse: Julia Hamilton (m. 1923)
- Issue: FitzRoy Somerset; Janetta Somerset; FitzRoy Somerset, 5th Baron Raglan; Geoffrey Somerset, 6th Baron Raglan; Cecily Somerset
- Parents: George Somerset, 3rd Baron Raglan; Ethel Jemima Ponsonby

FitzRoy Richard Somerset, 4th Baron Raglan FRAI (10 June 1885 – 14 September 1964) was a British soldier, author, and amateur anthropologist. His books include The Hero: A Study in Tradition, Myth and Drama and Monmouthshire Houses, with Cyril Fox.

== Life ==
FitzRoy Richard Somerset, heir to the title of Baron Raglan, was born on 10 June 1885 to George FitzRoy Henry Somerset, 3rd Baron Raglan and his wife Lady Ethel Jemima Ponsonby. He was educated at Sandroyd School, Eton and the Royal Military College, Sandhurst, and received a commission as Second lieutenant in the Militia regiment the Royal Monmouthshire Royal Engineers on 10 June 1902. In 1905 he entered the British Army and was commissioned in the Grenadier Guards. His military career included working as an aide-de-camp to the governor of Hong Kong, service in the Egyptian army from 1913 to 1919, district commissioner in Sudan and as a political officer in Palestine and Transjordan. In recognition of his services in Egypt he was made an Officer of the Order of the Nile. He retired from the Army in 1922 as a major.

With the death of his father in 1921, he assumed the title 4th Baron Raglan and, after retiring from the army, returned to his ancestral home, Cefntilla Court near Usk in Monmouthshire. Very active in local affairs, he was a Justice of the Peace for the county as early as 1909 and served for twenty-one years (1928–49) as a member of the former Monmouthshire county council. He took a great interest in the Boy Scout movement, was county commissioner for Monmouthshire for 27 years (1927–54), and served as Lord Lieutenant of Monmouthshire from 1942 until 1964.

During his life he studied and wrote on topics such as anthropology, political science, and architecture. His interest in the antiquities of Monmouthshire led him, with Sir Cyril Fox, to write three volumes on the county's medieval and later domestic architecture, Monmouthshire Houses. In 1933 he became president of Section H (Anthropology) of the British Association for the Advancement of Science, and from 1945 to 1947 he served as president of the Folklore Society. Chairman of the art and archaeology committee of the National Museum of Wales (1949–51) and president of the National Museum of Wales from 1957 to 1962, he was also president of the Royal Anthropological Institute from 1955 to 1957.

Lord Raglan was the source of various controversies over the course of his life. In 1938 he declared his wish to give up his job at the Ministry of Information on the grounds that he was not doing enough work to justify his salary. In 1958 he agitated Welsh nationalist feelings by declaring Welsh a 'moribund' language. Demands were made for his resignation from the National Museum of Wales, but he stood fast. (The motto of the Raglan barony is Mutare vel timere sperno: 'I scorn to change or to fear').

Lord Raglan died on 14 September 1964.

== Lady Raglan ==
On 9 April 1923 Raglan married Julia Hamilton (7 January 1901 – 17 April 1971), daughter of Lt.-Col. Robert Hamilton-Udny, 11th Lord Belhaven and Stenton by his marriage to Kathleen Gonville Bromhead. They had five children, the first of whom died a few days after birth. Lady Raglan also contributed to the study of folklore. In an article in the journal Folklore in 1939, she was the first to apply the name "Green Man" to the sculptures of foliate heads found in churches across much of Europe. It is often wrongly said that she invented the term, a belief that reading her own account, or consulting the OED, disproves; it was used since at least the 16th century for costumed figures in festivities, and later for the name of pubs.

== Literary works ==
Not only an active member of many societies and interested in administrative duties in national institutions, Lord Raglan also published a number of books and papers on archaeology and anthropology. His first book, Jocasta's Crime: An Anthropological Study, a study of incest and incest taboos, was published in 1933. He followed with The Science of Peace, a work on the origin, development, and prevention of war.

Lord Raglan's work The Hero: A Study in Tradition, Myth and Drama was published in 1936. The book's central thesis is that hero figures of mythology have their origin in ritual drama, not historical fact. In the book's most influential chapter, he outlines 22 common traits of god-heroes which he calls the "mythic hero archetype". Raglan then encapsulates the lives of several heroes and awards points (marks) for thematic elements for a possible score of 22. He dissects Oedipus, Theseus, Romulus, Heracles, Perseus, Jason, Bellerophon, Pelops, Asclepius, Dionysus, Apollo, Zeus, Joseph, Moses, Elijah, Watu Gunung, Nyikang, Sigurd (or Siegfried), Llew Llawgyffes, Arthur, and Robin Hood. Oedipus earns the highest score, with 21 marks. The pattern has been applied to other heroes including Beowulf and Harry Potter.

Significantly, Raglan excludes Jesus from the study, even though Jesus matched a number of the identified traits. Raglan later claimed to have omitted Jesus to avoid conflict with his publisher.

An outspoken atheist and active humanist, in the 1960s, Raglan was among the MPs and peers who established the All-Party Parliamentary Humanist Group in the British Parliament. He was a member of the British Humanist Association, serving on its advisory council.

== Bibliography ==
- Jocasta's Crime: An Anthropological Study, Methuen (London), 1933, Fertig (New York, NY), 1991
- The Science of Peace, Methuen, 1933, reprinted by Pierides Press, 2007 ISBN 978-1406789171
- If I Were Dictator, Methuen, 1934 (contributor)
- The Hero: A Study in Tradition, Myth and Drama, Methuen, 1936, reprinted by Dover Publications, 2011 ISBN 978-0486427089
- How Came Civilisation?, Methuen, 1939
- Death and Rebirth, C. A. Watts, 1945
- The Origins of Religion, C. A. Watts, 1949
- (With Cyril Fox) Monmouthshire Houses, Parts I–III, National Museum of Wales, 1951–54 ISBN 978-0720003987
- The Temple and the House, Routledge & Kegan Paul, 1964, Norton (New York, NY), 1965

Honorary titles
Preceded by Sir Henry Mather-Jackson, Bt	Lord Lieutenant of Monmouthshire; 1942–1964	Succeeded by Edward Roderick Hill
Peerage of the United Kingdom
Preceded by George FitzRoy Henry Somerset	Baron Raglan; 1921–1964	Succeeded by FitzRoy Somerset
