= Cyril Fox =

British archaeologist (1882–1967)

Sir Cyril Fox FSA FBA MRIA
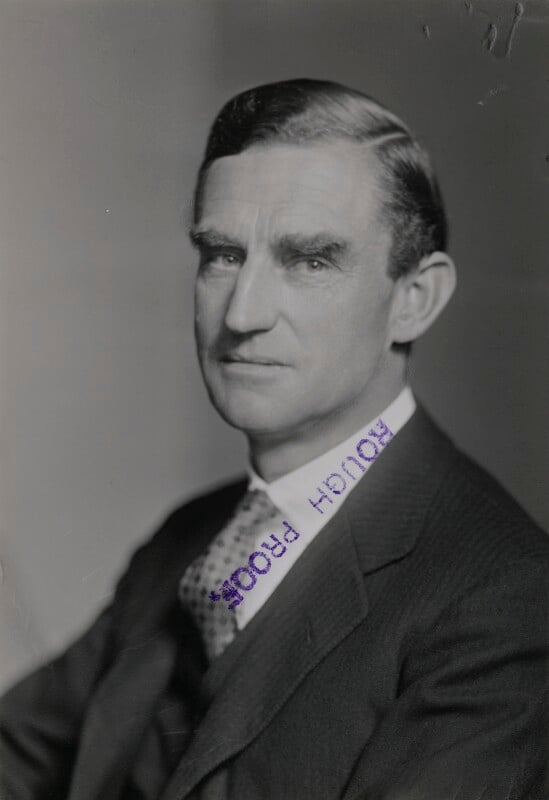
- Fox in 1946
- Born: 16 December 1882; Chippenham, Wiltshire, England
- Died: 15 January 1967 (aged 84); Exeter, Devon, England
- Spouse(s): Olive Congreve-Pridgeon (m. 1916; died 1932) Aileen Mary Henderson (m. 1933)
- Children: 2 daughters, 3 sons
- Scientific career
- Fields: Archaeology, museum director
- Institutions: National Museum of Wales

Sir Cyril Fred Fox FSA FBA MRIA (16 December 1882 – 15 January 1967) was an English archaeologist and museum director.

Fox became keeper of archaeology at the National Museum of Wales, and subsequently served as director from 1926 to 1948. Many of his most notable achievements were collaborative. With his second wife, Aileen Fox, he surveyed and excavated several prehistoric monuments in Wales. With Iorwerth Peate, he established the Welsh Folk Museum at St Fagans, and with Lord Raglan, he authored a definitive history of vernacular architecture, Monmouthshire Houses.

== Early life ==
Sir Cyril Fred Fox was born in Chippenham, Wiltshire. He was educated at Christ's Hospital school. His first job, at the age of 16, was as a gardener. He served as a clerk in a government commission on tuberculosis and then as director of a small research station in Cambridge. He moved to work part-time for the university's museum of archaeology and anthropology, and in 1919 was admitted to Magdalene College, Cambridge, as a part-time student of archaeology, at first reading for the newly-founded English tripos. Spotted by Professor H. M. Chadwick, he was soon allowed to proceed straight to doctoral study, and in 1922 he completed a Ph.D thesis entitled Archaeology of the Cambridge Region. This work was published under the same title in 1923, and met with immediate success, with his election to a Fellow of the Society of Antiquaries in the same year.

== Career ==
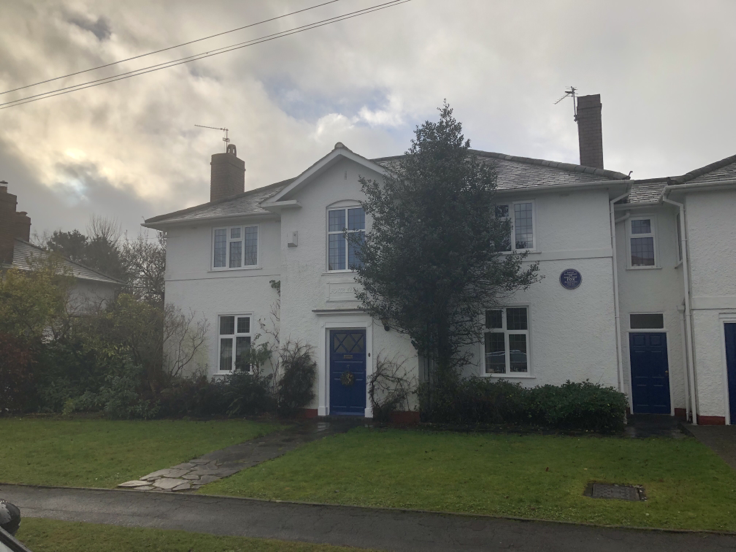
Four Elms, in Rhiwbina Garden Village, Cardiff, carries a Blue plaque commemorating Fox’s occupancy

In 1922 Fox was appointed curator of archaeology at the National Museum of Wales by his close friend Mortimer Wheeler and in 1926 succeeded Wheeler as its director. He was additionally president of the Society of Antiquaries of London from 1944 to 1949, and concurrently the president of the Council of British Archaeology.

He produced a large number of publications. They include The Personality of Britain (1932), drawing attention to the differences between upland and lowland Britain; Offa's Dyke (1955), a seminal study of that great earthwork, and studies on Celtic Art, on the major discovery of early ironwork at Llyn Cerrig Bach in Anglesey; and Monmouthshire Houses, co-authored with Lord Raglan.

For his administrative and scholarly work he gained a wide range of honours, including a knighthood (1935) and Fellowship of the British Academy (1940). Together with his colleague Nash-Williams at the Museum of Wales, he collaborated with the artist Alan Sorrell on reconstruction drawings of the Roman excavations at Caerwent which were published in the Illustrated London News 1937–1942. Among other achievements, he worked with his colleague Iorwerth Peate on the development of what became in 1946, under Peate's curatorship, the Welsh Folk Museum at St Fagans, near Cardiff (now the St Fagans National History Museum).

== Personal life ==
In 1916, Fox married his first wife, Olive Congreve-Pridgeon, with whom he had two daughters. Olive died in a swimming accident in 1932. The year after her death Fox married Aileen Scott-Henderson, a fellow archaeologist. They had three sons. The family lived at Four Elms, a house in Rhiwbina Garden Village, in the north of Cardiff from 1928 until Fox’s retirement in 1948. They then moved to Exeter, Devon, following Aileen’s appointment to a post at the University of Exeter. Fox died in 1967.
