= Bryngwyn (disambiguation) =

Bryngwyn is a village in Monmouthshire, Wales. It may also refer to:

- Bryngwyn, Ceredigion, a small village in Ceredigion, Wales
- Bryngwyn, Powys, a small village in Powys, Wales
- Bryngwyn railway station, former railway terminus in Gwynedd, Wales
- Bryngwyn Hall, historic house in Powys, Wales
- Bryngwyn Manor, manor house in Much Dewchurch, Herefordshire
- Bryn Gwyn, the name in Welsh Mythology for the hill and ancient fort now called Tower Hill and The Tower of London.
- Castell Bryn Gwyn, a prehistoric site on Anglesey, featuring the Bryn Gwyn stones.
