= Caer Lêb =

Archaeological site in Anglesey, Wales

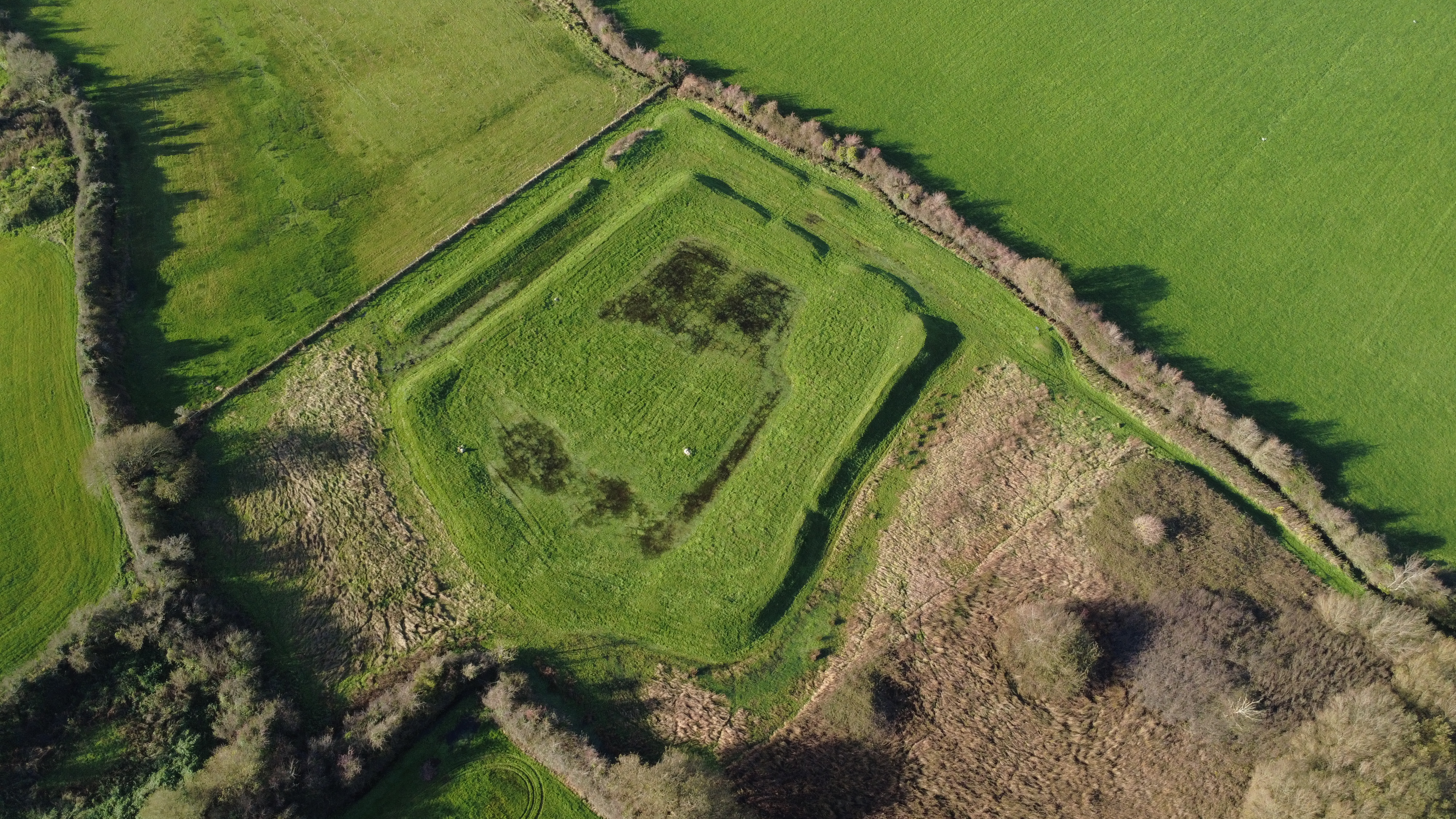
- Caer Lêb
- Interactive map of Caer Lêb
- 53.1818°N 4.2868°W
- Type: Roman fortlet
- Periods: Roman and mediaeval
- Location: Anglesey, Wales
- Region: Great Britain

Site notes
- Material: earth
- Height: 1 m (3 ft 3 in)
- Length: 80 m (260 ft)
- Width: 72 m (236 ft)
- Management: Cadw
- Public access: Yes

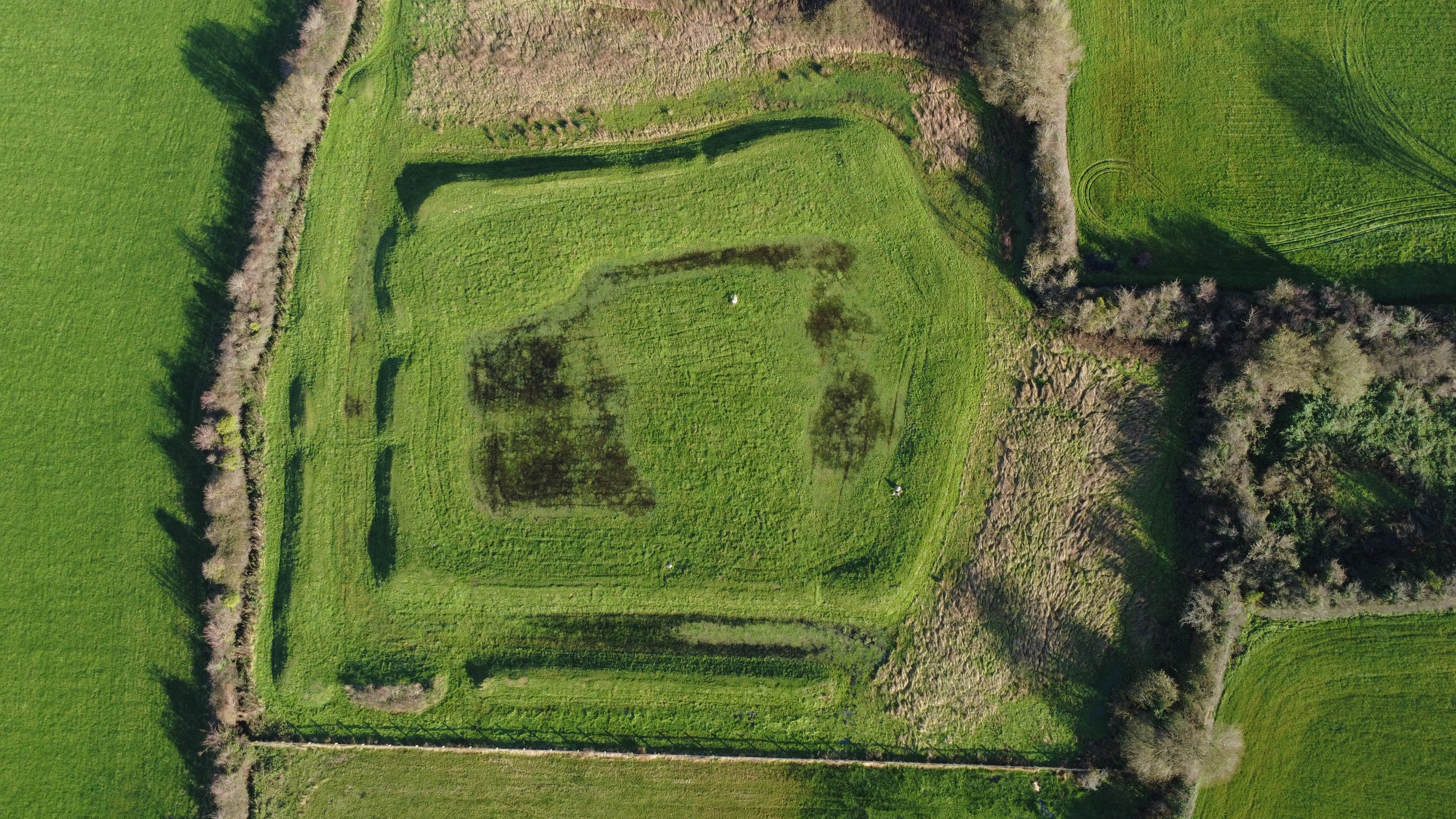

Caer Lêb is a Roman and mediaeval site on the Welsh island of Anglesey, west of Brynsiencyn. Its name means "Leaven Castle". It is a low-lying site near the Afon Braint with a double row of pentangular banks (some parts now levelled) and marshy ditches. The original entrance was on the east, other gaps are modern and caused by animals. Based on the excavation of a similar site elsewhere on Anglesey, it may date from the 2nd century BCE.

Excavations in 1865 found structures within the enclosure, rectangular buildings on the east and a circular one on the south. Nothing of these can now be seen on the ground. Pottery from the 2nd century to the 4th century was found, and on the north side a layer of periwinkle shells and a mediaeval coin, under a layer of peat.

About twenty-five paces north-west of these earthworks there stood, some thirty years ago, the ruins of a large house, described by the tenant who removed it as being 24 yards long by 18 wide. Its walls were from 4 to 5 feet thick, consisting of large boulders, a great number of which, owing to their size, he had much difficulty in displacing. It had the sills of several wide windows in position. Retaining in view the history of the locality, we may not be far wrong in supposing that the stone materials of this house were taken from the neighbouring ruins of an earlier date.

a A circular foundation, diameter, 18 feet; thickness of walls, 3 feet 6 inches; marked a on the plan.

b The outer side of the wall, of very rude masonry, floored with slabs of limestone. In the centre of the hut was found a large stone mortar in situ, the upper edge being about the level of the floor. Diameter of the circular hole, 1 foot; depth, 6 inches.

At one side of the hut, close to the wall, was what had evidently been the fireplace; layers of burnt matter (a kind of red ash) being found there, whilst around were scattered numerous teeth and bones, principally of the ox, also a few oyster-shells. Part of a well-finished quern (the upper stone), grooved, and a green glass stud, were discovered upon the floor.

Here was found a denarius of Postumus.

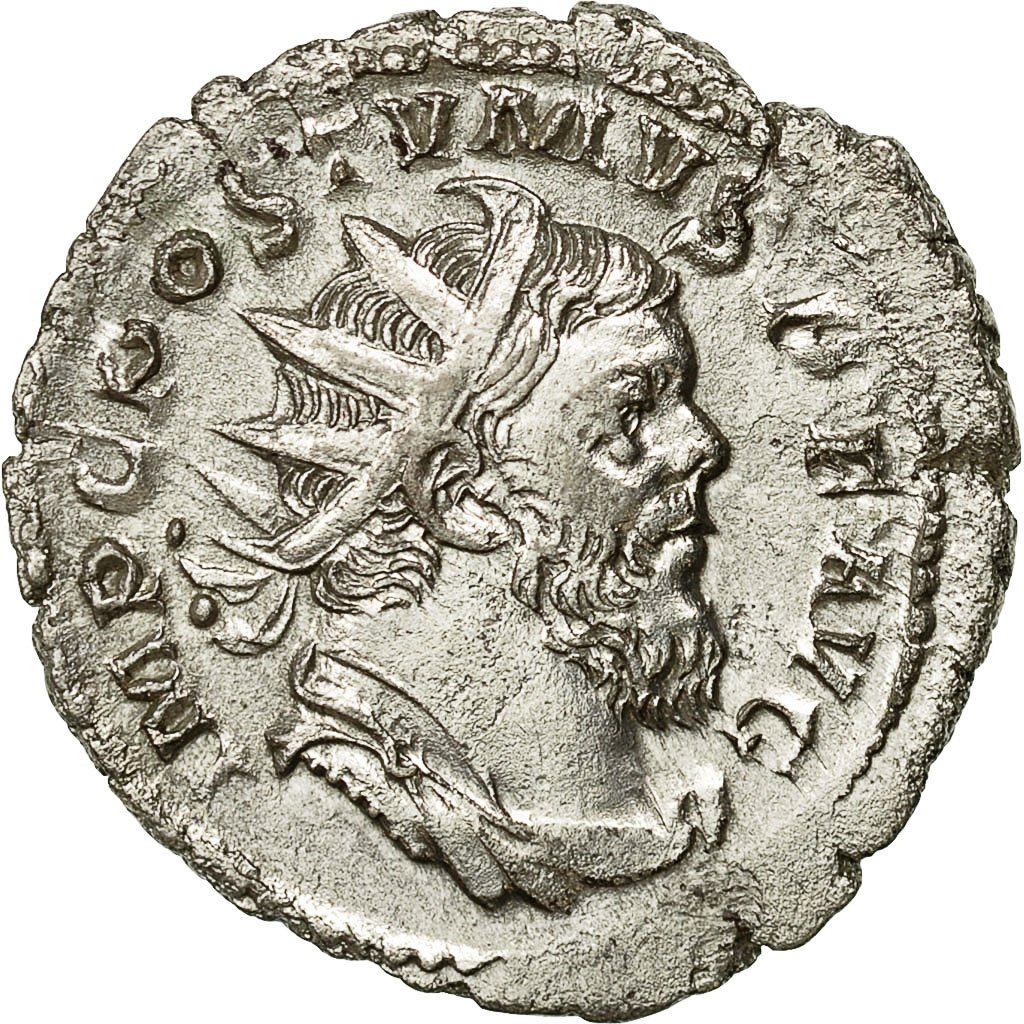
Antoninianus (not a denarius) of Postumus

A small stone mortar and fragments of pottery also came to light. A perforated disc of hard black stone was discovered within the building, four inches and two-eighths in diameter, and one inch and one-eighth in thickness, where the hole is at the centre; and bevelled to the thickness of an inch at the outer edge, which is somewhat rounded.

c A portion of rude masonry (marked c on the plan), was this day uncovered. It appeared to be a kind of chamber, measuring about 10 feet each way, with walls 3 feet 6 inches thick; but nothing like a paved floor was found within. Whilst digging so as to expose the outer side of this mass of stonework, a bronze fibula, in perfect preservation, was met with; also a fragment of Samian pottery, with animal remains, and a portion of a muller.

d Accordingly on Friday, Nov. 3, two men were set to work at the east angle of the inner entrenchment, marked d on the plan. Here, although the surface was promising, we were disappointed to find beneath it the rudest construction of stones and earth. Our evening's work closed with the discovery of a silver coin (groat) of Henry V or VI, minted at Calais. Obv., henric . di . GRA . REX . ANGL . ET . FRANC. ,* WV., VILLA . CALISIE, and posvi . devm . adivtorem . mevm.

e Within the area of the inner square there is an elevated platform about nine yards wide, which extends along the north-eastern breastwork, and is of questionable origin. Here we made a small excavation (marked e on the plan) with the view of ascertaining its character, and found that, to the depth of 3 feet, it consisted of a friable black mould, seemingly of peat, such as a florist might desire. Beneath it were numerous fragments of marine shells, apparently those of the periwinkle; and one piece of pottery of doubtful antiquity. Connecting this circumstance with the discovery of an English coin at its eastern extremity, we are justified in supposing it to be a work of a comparatively recent date.

W. Wynn Williams, Menaifron. Jan. 26,1866. Hugh Prichard, Dinam.

There is a parking area, sufficient for 4-5 cars, by the roadside. A footpath goes southwest on a low ridge, some 2 metres above the Afon Braint, from Caer Lêb over stiles, past the site of the former stone circle of Tre'r Dryw Bach, some 800 metres to Castell Bryn Gwyn and on to the Bryn Gwyn stones and the A4080.

500 metres north-west along the road, by Pont Sarn Las (Green Causeway Bridge), the foundations of three round houses may be visible after a dry summer. A large settlement was recorded in the 19th century, and destroyed in the 1870s by agricultural improvement.

== Gallery ==
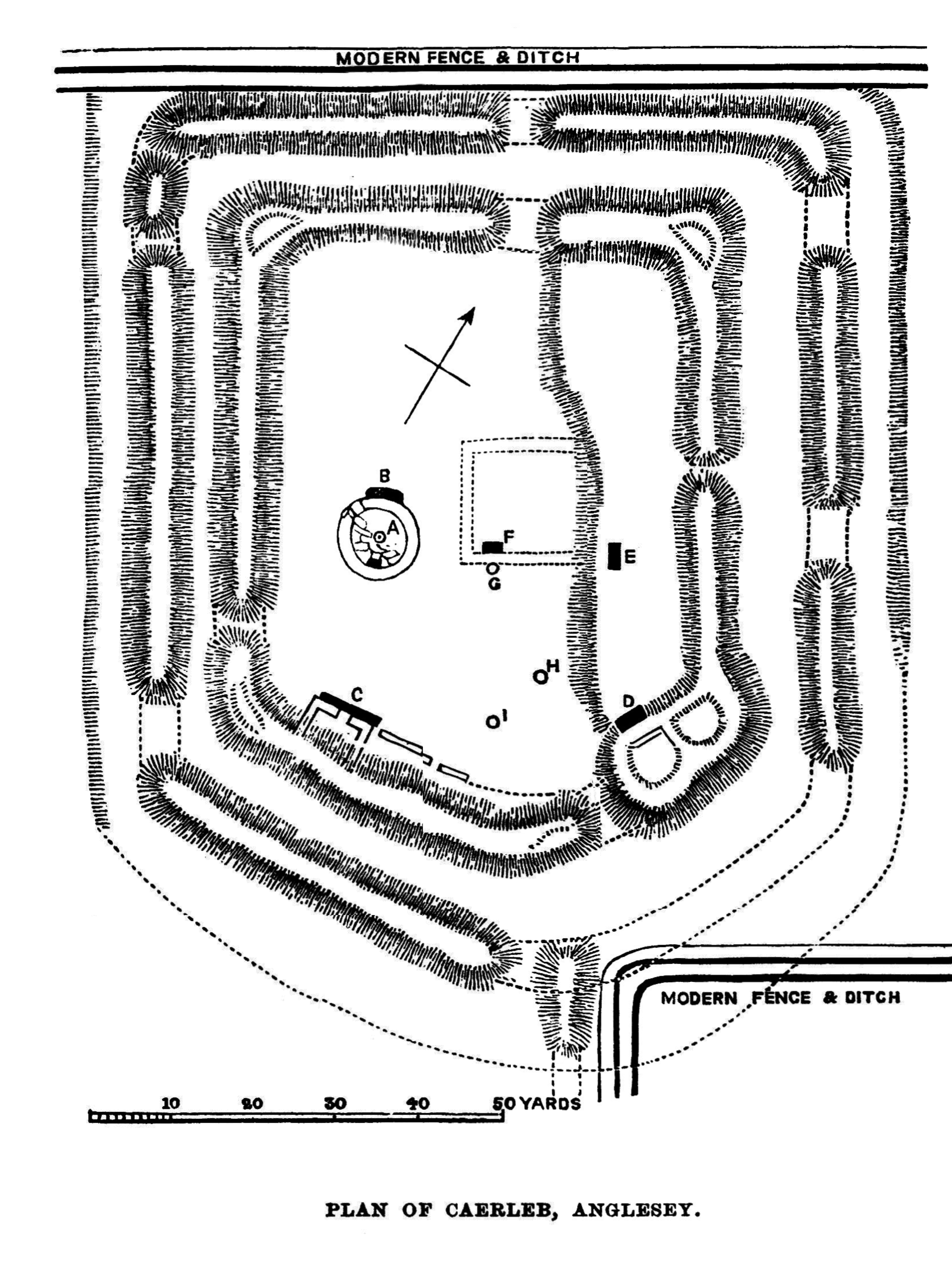
Plan of Caer Lêb, an earthwork on Anglesey, with details of excavations in 1866
