= List of shipwrecks in April 1847 =

The list of shipwrecks in April 1847 includes ships sunk, foundered, wrecked, grounded, or otherwise lost during April 1847.

== 1 April ==
List of shipwrecks: 1 April 1847
Ship	State	Description
Mentor	France	The sloop departed from Fraserburg, Aberdeenshire, United Kingdom for Icelandic waters. Presumed subsequently foundered off Banff, Aberdeenshire.
Rapid	United Kingdom	The ship was driven ashore in the River Mersey. She was on a voyage from Liverpool, Lancashire to Rotterdam, South Holland, Netherlands. She was refloated and resumed her voyage.
Sisters	United Kingdom	The ship was driven ashore in the River Mersey. She was on a voyage from Liverpool to Rotterdam. She was refloated and resumed her voyage.

== 2 April ==
List of shipwrecks: 2 April 1847
Ship	State	Description
Geerdina	Netherlands	The koff ran aground on the Puttgard Reef. she was refloated and beached at "Heilingerhafen". She was on a voyage from Stettin to Amsterdam, North Holland.
Ironside	United Kingdom	The ship was abandoned in the Atlantic Ocean. Her crew were rescued by Queen Pomare (United Kingdom. Ironside was on a voyage from New Orleans, Louisiana, United States to Cork.
Romp	United Kingdom	The ship capsized during a squall with the loss of all but her captain. He was rescued by Arthur (United Kingdom). Romp was on a voyage from Málaga, Spain to Liverpool, Lancashire.

== 3 April ==
List of shipwrecks: 3 April 1847
Ship	State	Description
Isabella Ann	(United Kingdom of Great Britain and Ireland) British North America	The schooner was wrecked on Goose Island.

== 4 April ==
List of shipwrecks: 4 April 1847
Ship	State	Description
Eliza	United Kingdom	The ship caught fire and was abandoned in the North Sea with the loss of crew member. Survivors were rescued from their boat on 8 April.
Jeune Charles	France	The ship was abandoned in the Atlantic Ocean off Cape Finisterre, Spain. Her crew were rescued. She was on a voyage from Newcastle upon Tyne, Northumberland, United Kingdom to Marseille, Bouches-du-Rhône.

== 5 April ==
List of shipwrecks: 5 April 1847
Ship	State	Description
Brodrene	Flag unknown	The sloop was driven ashore and wrecked on Læsø, Denmark.
Falcon	United Kingdom	The ship was severely damaged by fire at Halifax, Nova Scotia, British North America.
Gannet	United Kingdom	The brig collided with Fanny (United Kingdom) and was abandoned ed in the Atlantic Ocean. Her crew were rescued. She was on a voyage from Saint Domingo to Liverpool, Lancashire. Gannet was discovered on 16 May by Ann (United Kingdom and set afire.
St. Michael	Hamburg	The ship was abandoned in the North Sea off Terschelling, Friesland, Netherlands. Her crew were rescued. She was on a voyage from Hamburg to Antwerp, Belgium. St. Michael subsequently drove ashore on Terschelling and was wrecked.

== 6 April ==
List of shipwrecks: 6 April 1847
Ship	State	Description
Princess Royal	United Kingdom	The ship sank in a hurricane at Leyte, Spanish East Indies with the loss of all hands.

== 7 April ==
List of shipwrecks: 7 April 1847
Ship	State	Description
Active	United Kingdom	The sloop sank at Inverkeithing, Fife.
Alhambra	United Kingdom	The ship foundered in the Atlantic Ocean. Her crew were rescued by Queen Mab (United Kingdom). Alhambra was on a voyage from Liverpool, Lancashire to Valparaíso, Chile.
Catherina Louisa	Hamburg	The ship was driven ashore at Cuxhaven.
Native	United Kingdom	The ship was driven ashore and wrecked at Hartland Quay, Devon. All on board were rescued. She was on a voyage from Kinsale, County Cork to Newport, Monmouthshire.
Tunstall	United Kingdom	The brig departed from Sunderland, County Durham for Saint Petersburg, Russia. Presumed foundered in the North Sea with the loss of all hands; part of a nameboare bearing the letters "TUNS" was discovered by the brig Henrietta ( Stettin), believed to have come from Tunstall.

== 8 April ==
List of shipwrecks: 8 April 1847
Ship	State	Description
Baptiste Marie	France	The ship ran aground and was damaged at Margate, Kent, United Kingdom. She was on a voyage from the Charente to London, United Kingdom. She was refloated and taken in to Margate in a leaky condition.
Ewarts	United Kingdom	The ship was driven ashore at Peterhead, Aberdeenshire. She was refloated the next day.
Indus	United Kingdom	The ship was driven ashore in Aboukir Bay. She was on a voyage from London to Alexandria, Egypt. She was refloated on 11 April and taken in to Alexandria.
Irrwisch	Prussia	The steamship caught fire and sank off "Wiedenburg". All on board were rescued.
Lillias	United Kingdom	The schooner was driven ashore at Queensferry, Scotland.
Northumberland	United Kingdom	The ship was driven ashore and damaged at Ardmore, County Waterford. She was on a voyage from Greenock, Renfrewshire to Quebec City, Province of Canada, British North America. She was refloated and put back to Greenock.
Sarah	United Kingdom	The schooner was abandoned in the North Sea off the mouth of the Humber. Her crew were rescued by Royal William (United Kingdom). Sarah was on a voyage from Newcastle upon Tyne, Northumberland to Lowestoft, Suffolk.
Saluna	United Kingdom	The brig foundered off Dunnet Head, Caithness with the loss of all but her captain. She was on a voyage from Inverness to Islay, Inner Hebrides.
Twende Brodre	Denmark	The ship was beached at Southend-on-Sea, Essex, United Kingdom. She was on a voyage from Denmark to London.
Yarmouth	(United Kingdom of Great Britain and Ireland) British North America	The ship was driven ashore in Berlin Bay. She was on a voyage from Dublin to Philadelphia, Pennsylvania, United States.

== 9 April ==
List of shipwrecks: 9 April 1847
Ship	State	Description
Ann Catherine	United States	The ship collided with an iceberg and was abandoned. Her crew were rescued by Messenger (United States). Ann Catherine was on a voyage from Alexandria, Virginia to Limerick, United Kingdom.
Admiral Codrington	United Kingdom	The schooner was driven ashore at Hamburg.
Akke Boon	Netherlands	The ship was driven ashore at Maassluis, South Holland.
Bluhende Christine	Hamburg	The ship was driven ashore in the Elbe.
Clarisse	France	The brig was wrecked on Saint Pierre Island with the loss of 60 of the 69 people on board.
Egbertus	Netherlands	The ship was wrecked on the Grunderwald with the loss of two of her crew. She was on a voyage from Harlingen, Friesland to a Norwegian port.
Good Intent	United Kingdom	The ship was driven ashore and wrecked at Whitby, Yorkshire.
Hebe	United Kingdom	The sloop foundered in the North Sea 26 nautical miles (48 km) east of Huntley Foot, Yorkshire. Her crew were rescued by Albion (United Kingdom). Hebe was on a voyage from Newcastle upon Tyne, Northumberland to Peterhead, Aberdeenshire.
Herschel	Bremen	The brig was driven ashore in the Elbe.
Hoffnung	Hamburg	The ship was driven ashore near Petten, North Holland, Netherlands. She was on a voyage from Hamburg to Antwerp, Belgium.
Isabella	United Kingdom	The ship foundered in the North Sea 67 nautical miles (124 km) off Tynemouth, Northumberland. Her crew were rescued by Elizabeth Reid (United Kingdom). Isabella was on a voyage from South Shields, County Durham to Leith, Lothian.
Josephine	United States	The ship was driven ashore on Jura, Inner Hebrides. Her crew were rescued. She was on a voyage from Philadelphia, Pennsylvania to Londonderry, United Kingdom.
Leadbetter	United Kingdom	The ship was driven ashore on Flotta, Orkney Islands.
Lower Schulau Lightship	Hamburg	The lightship was driven ashore at Spitzerdorf.
Mathew	United Kingdom	The ship was wrecked on the west coast of Hoy, Orkney Islands with the loss of all hands.
Zulette	United States	The barque sank at Milford, County Donegal, United Kingdom.

== 10 April ==
List of shipwrecks: 10 April 1847
Ship	State	Description
Celerity	United Kingdom	The ship was driven ashore and damaged at Whitby, Yorkshire. Her crew were rescued. She was refloated on 12 April and taken in to Whitby.
Endeavour	United Kingdom	The ship ran aground at Tynemouth, Northumberland and was damaged. She was on a voyage from Glasgow, Renfrewshire to Hull, Yorkshire. She was refloated and taken in to Hartlepool, County Durham in a sinking condition.
Emilie Heikema	Netherlands	The ship was driven ashore near "Zolltkampf", Prussia.
Lamberta Kurst	Netherlands	The ship was driven ashore near "Zolltkampf".
Peggy	United Kingdom	The ship ran aground on the Hoyle Bank, in Liverpool Bay. She was on a voyage from Barrow-in-Furness, Lancashire to Port Talbot, Glamorgan. She was refloated and taken in to Liverpool, Lancashire in a waterlogged condition.

== 11 April ==
List of shipwrecks: 11 April 1847
Ship	State	Description
Mayflower	United Kingdom	The brig foundered off Padstow, Cornwall. She was on a voyage from Aberdeen to Callao, Peru.
Penelope	(United Kingdom of Great Britain and Ireland) Jersey	The ship was driven ashore and wrecked at Prampram, British Accra.

== 12 April ==
List of shipwrecks: 12 April 1847
Ship	State	Description
Jannet	United Kingdom	The ship struck rocks at Cauler Head, Orkney Islands and was damaged. She was refloated and taken in to Stromness, Orkney Islands.
Neptune	United Kingdom	The ship was driven ashore at Workington, Cumberland. She was on a voyage from Workington to Drogheda, County Louth.
Unity	United Kingdom	The schooner was driven ashore at Peterhead, Aberdeenshire. She was on a voyage from Sunderland, County Durham to Nairn.
William	United Kingdom	The ship was driven ashore at Whitby, Yorkshire. Her crew were rescued.

== 13 April ==
List of shipwrecks: 13 April 1847
Ship	State	Description
Commerce de Charenton	France	The ship was wrecked on the Île Pelée, Manche.
Defiance	United Kingdom	The fishing smack was run down and sunk in the Humber by Queen of Scotland (United Kingdom) with the loss of a crew member.
James	United Kingdom	The schooner ran aground on the Herd Sand, in the North Sea off the coast of County Durham. She was on a voyage from South Shields to Sunderland, County Durham. She was refloated and taken in to South Shields.
Port Leon	United States	The ship was wrecked at Cape Bold, Africa. She was on a voyage from the Gambia River to New York.
Rio	United Kingdom	The ship was driven ashore and wrecked at Hirtshals, Denmark. Her crew were rescued. She was on a voyage from Liverpool, Lancashire to Saint Petersburg, Russia.
Rochester	United States	The ship ran aground on the Blackwater Bank, in the Irish Sea and sank. All on board, over 300 people, were rescued by boats from Arklow, County Wicklow, United Kingdom. Rochester was on a voyage from Liverpool to New York.
Tagus	United Kingdom	The ship was wrecked on Læsø, Denmark. Her crew were rescued. She was on a voyage from Leith, Lothian to Riga, Russia.
Vertumnus	United Kingdom	The ship was wrecked near Harboøre, Denmark with the loss of nine of her crew. She was on a voyage from London to Saint Petersburg.

== 14 April ==
List of shipwrecks: 14 April 1847
Ship	State	Description
Golden Fleece	(United Kingdom of Great Britain and Ireland) New South Wales	The barque was driven ashore at the mouth of the Richmond River. Her crew were rescued.
Grana Uile	United Kingdom	The paddle steamer, Liverpool for Drogheda caught fire 30 miles east of Lambay Island and north west of Anglesey and sank. 69 passengers and crew saved by fishing smack Bessey; about thirty lives lost (maybe more as not all passengers were counted), included Captain Rawden.
Highlander	United Kingdom	The ship ran aground at Smyrna, Ottoman Empire. She was on a voyage from Smyrna to Liverpool, Lancashire. She was refloated the next day and resumed her voyage.
John and Sally	United Kingdom	The ship was wrecked at Pembrey, Carmarthenshire. Her crew were rescued.
Kate	United Kingdom	The ship was destroyed by fire off the Old Head of Kinsale, County Cork. She was on a voyage from Bantry to Cork.
Kitty	United Kingdom	The ship foundered off The Scalp. Her crew were rescued. She was on a voyage from Portree, Isle of Skye to Lochgilphead, Argyllshire.
Société	France	The schooner was wrecked on the Kentish Knock. Her crew were rescued. She was on a voyage from Sunderland, County Durham, United Kingdom to Nantes, Loire-Inférieure.
Welcome	United Kingdom	The barque was on the Shoad Subad reef, south west of Yambo, Ottoman Empire with the loss of fifteen of her nineteen crew. She was on a voyage from Hartlepool, County Durham to Suez, Egypt.
Whitburn	United Kingdom	The ship was wrecked off Whitby, Yorkshire. Her crew were rescued.

== 15 April ==
List of shipwrecks: 15 April 1847
Ship	State	Description
Canopus	United Kingdom	The barque departed from Liverpool, Lancashire for Pictou, Nova Scotia, British North America. No further trace, presumed foundered with the loss of all hands.
Cleopatra	India	The paddle steamer foundered in the Indian Ocean off the Malabar Coast with the loss of nearly 300 lives. She was on a voyage from Singapore to Bombay.
Croft	United Kingdom	The ship foundered off the coast of County Durham. She was on a voyage from South Shields, County Durham to a Scottish port.
Elizabeth	(United Kingdom of Great Britain and Ireland) Van Diemen's Land	The schooner was wrecked on Swan Island. her crew were rescued. She was on a voyage from New Zealand to Launceston.
Juliette	France	The ship was in collision with Jeune Basquaise (France) in the North Sea off the Lemon Sand and was abandoned by all but one of her crew, who were rescued by Jeune Basquaise. The other crew member was also rescued. Juliette was on a voyage from Hamburg to Rochefort, Charente-Maritime.
Lactor et Emergo	United States	The ship ran aground at Portsmouth, Hampshire, United Kingdom. She was on a voyage from Rotterdam, South Holland, Netherlands to Boston, Massachusetts.
Van Spyck	Netherlands	The schooner was in collision with the barque Emma (Bremen) and sank in the English Channel 8 leagues (24 nautical miles (44 km)) off The Lizard, Cornwall. Her crew were rescued by Emma. Van Spyck was on a voyage from Surinam to Amsterdam, North Holland

== 16 April ==
List of shipwrecks: 16 April 1847
Ship	State	Description
Montcalm	United Kingdom	The ship was driven ashore on the Mull of Kintyre, Argyllshire. She was on a voyage from Liverpool, Lancashire to Kronstadt, Russia. She was refloated on 18 April and taken in to Port Ellen, Islay, Inner Hebrides.
Wizard	United Kingdom	The ship ran aground on the Hayland Rocks, off the coast of Kent. She was on a voyage from London to Lisbon, Portugal.

== 17 April ==
List of shipwrecks: April 1847
Ship	State	Description
Atlantic	United Kingdom	The ship was driven ashore near St. Davids Head, Pembrokeshire. She was on a voyage from Newport, Monmouthshire to Conway, Caernarfonshire.
Day	United Kingdom	The ship was driven ashore and wrecked at Sandy Hook, New Jersey, United States. She was on a voyage from Limerick to New York, United States.
John	United Kingdom	The brig was holed by an anchor and sank in the River Tyne.
Leander	United Kingdom	The ship was abandoned in the Atlantic Ocean (27°00′N 17°30′W) with the loss of fifteen of her 26 crew. She was on a voyage from Liverpool, Lancashire to Savannah, Georgia, United States.
Mary Pleasant	United Kingdom	The ship ran aground at the mouth of the Mississippi River. She was on a voyage from New Orleans, Louisiana, United States to Liverpool.
Menai	United Kingdom	The brig was abandoned in the Atlantic Ocean. Her crew were rescued by Ward (United Kingdom). Menai was on a voyage from Belfast, County Antrim to New York, United States.
Merlin	United States	The ship departed from the Clyde for New York. No further trace, presumed foundered with the loss of all hands.
St. Patrick	United Kingdom	The ship was in collision with another vessel and sank with the loss of two of her crew. She was on a voyage from Sunderland, County Durham to London.
William	United Kingdom	The William shifted at her berth in Holy Island Harbour on Lindisfarne on 17 April 1847. The vessel settled on her anchor, puncturing the hull. Water got to the cargo of quicklime and the boat caught fire, only eventually being extinguished by the rising tide.

== 18 April ==
List of shipwrecks: 18 April 1847
Ship	State	Description
Frances	United Kingdom	The ship was in collision with a steamship and sank in the River Thames downstream of Gravesend, Kent with the loss of all but one of her crew. She was on a voyage from London to Goole, Yorkshire.
Herring	United Kingdom	The ship was in collision with the steamship Myrtle (United Kingdom) in the English Channel off Beachy Head, Sussex. She was towed in to Newhaven, Sussex in a waterlogged condition by Myrtle. Herring was on a voyage from Great Yarmouth, Norfolk to Plymouth, Devon.
Nova Scotia	(United Kingdom of Great Britain and Ireland) British North America	The ship was wrecked on Jardine's Bank, off the Isle of Pines, Cuba. Her crew were rescued. She was on a voyage from Cienfuegos, Cuba to Newfoundland.
Sceptre	United Kingdom	The ship was severely damaged by fire at South Shields, County Durham.

== 19 April ==
List of shipwrecks: 19 April 1847
Ship	State	Description
Diamond	(United Kingdom of Great Britain and Ireland) Grenada	The cutter was driven ashore and wrecked in Macquis Bay.
Hero	United Kingdom	The steamship foundered "in the Steene". Her crew were rescued. She was on a voyage from Newcastle upon Tyne, Northumberland to Saint Petersburg, Russia.
Janet Thomas	United Kingdom	The ship departed from the Clyde for Valparaíso, Chile. No further trace, presumed foundered with the loss of all hands.
Lightfoot	United Kingdom	The ship was driven ashore. She was on a voyage from Liverpool, Lancashire to Newfoundland, British North America. She was refloated and taken in to Belfast, County Antrim.
Mermaid	United Kingdom	The ship was driven ashore and wrecked 5 nautical miles (9.3 km) from Vingoria, India. Her crew were rescued. She was on a voyage from Bombay, India to Singapore and China.
Orontes	United Kingdom	The ship ran aground on the West Hoyle Bank, in Liverpool Bay. She was on a voyage from Cork to Liverpool, Lancashire. She was refloated and completed her voyage.
Vrouw Wobbegina	Netherlands	The ship was abandoned off Borkum, Kingdom of Hanover. She was on a voyage from Hamburg to Amsterdam, North Holland. She was subsequently beached on Rottumeroog.

== 20 April ==
List of shipwrecks: 20 April 1847
Ship	State	Description
Ann	United Kingdom	The ship ran aground off Helsingør, Denmark. She was on a voyage from Danzig to Rouen, Seine-Inférieure, France. She was refloated the next day and resumed her voyage.
Ashland	United Kingdom	The ship was driven ashore at Southampton, New York, United States. She was on a voyage from Liverpool, Lancashire to New York City. She was refloated on 8 May but drove ashore again. Ashland was refloated on 5 June and taken in to New York City.
Charles	United Kingdom	The ship was wrecked on The Skerries, in the Irish Sea off the coast of County Antrim. . Her crew survived. She was on a voyage from Coleraine, County Antrim to Glasgow, Renfrewshire.
Fanny	United Kingdom	The ship was wrecked on The Skerries. Her crew survived.
Ligonia	United States	The ship was abandoned in the Atlantic Ocean. Her crew were rescued by Dawson (United Kingdom). Ligonia was on a voyage from New Orleans, Louisiana to Brest, Finistère, France.
Orion	United Kingdom	The ship was driven ashore near the Agger Canal, Denmark. Her crew were rescued. She was on a voyage from Leith, Lothian to a Baltic port. She was refloated on 25 April and taken in to Thisted for repairs.
Waterloo Packet	United Kingdom	The ship was abandoned in the Atlantic Ocean. Her crew were rescued by Dauntless (United Kingdom).
Yucatan	United Kingdom	The ship was wrecked on the Carysfort Reef. Her crew were rescued. She was on a voyage from New Orleans, Louisiana, United States to Liverpool.

== 21 April ==
List of shipwrecks: 21 April 1847
Ship	State	Description
Albatross	United Kingdom	The schooner was in collision with the full-rigged ship Nonpareil (Spain) and foundered with the loss of five of her seven crew. The survivors were rescued by Nonpareil. Albatross was on a voyage from Liverpool, Lancashire to Lisbon, Portugal.
Dane	United States	The ship was driven ashore at Donaghadee, County Down, United Kingdom. She was on a voyage from New York to Belfast, County Antrim, United Kingdom.
Duke of Cambridge	United Kingdom	The steamship ran aground off The Needles, Isle of Wight. She was refloated and taken in to Southampton, Hampshire.
Margaret Power	(United Kingdom of Great Britain and Ireland) British North America	The ship was lost off Green Pond with the loss of 21 of her crew.

== 22 April ==
List of shipwrecks: 22 April 1847
Ship	State	Description
Elizabeth	(United Kingdom of Great Britain and Ireland) New Zealand	The schooner was wrecked on Swan Island, Van Diemen's Land. Her crew were rescued. She was on a voyage from New Zealand to Launceston, Van Diemen's Land.
Favourite	United Kingdom	The ship was driven ashore near Rønne, Denmark. She was on a voyage from London to Saint Petersburg, Russia. She was refloated on 24 April and resumed her voyage.
Fulmar	United Kingdom	The ship was wrecked on a shoal 2 leagues (6 nautical miles (11 km)) west of Estepona, Spain. Her crew were rescued. She was on a voyage from Smyrna, Ottoman Empire to Liverpool, Lancashire.
Medusa	Prussia	The barque was abandoned off the coast of Ireland with some loss of life. Five crew were rescued by Oriental (United Kingdom). Medusa was on a voyage from Stettin to Liverpool.
Prince of Wales	United Kingdom	The steamship was driven ashore at Gray Point. She was on a voyage from Fleetwood, Lancashire to Belfast, County Antrim, She was refloated.
Vesper	United Kingdom	The ship was driven ashore at Cape Tito, Sicily. She was on a voyage from Zante, Greece to Cork or Falmouth, Cornwall. She was refloated on 3 May and resumed her voyage.

== 23 April ==
List of shipwrecks: 23 April 1847
Ship	State	Description
Amor de Patria	Grand Duchy of Tuscany	The ship was wrecked on the English Bank. All on board were rescued. She was on a voyage from Genoa to Montevideo, Uruguay.
Le President	(Haiti) Haitian Navy	The barque exploded and sank at Port-au-Prince with the loss of over 80 lives.
Mary Ann	United Kingdom	The ship was driven ashore and severely damaged at Bottomry Point. She was on a voyage from Newport, Monmouthshire to Cork.

== 24 April ==
List of shipwrecks: 24 April 1847
Ship	State	Description
British Sovereign	United Kingdom	The whaler was wrecked in the Sandwich Islands. All but one of her crew were murdered by the local inhabitants.
John Bromham	United Kingdom	The ship was driven ashore near Charleston, South Carolina, United States. She was on a voyage from New Orleans, Louisiana, United States to Cork. She was refloated on 26 April and taken in to Charleston.

== 25 April ==
List of shipwrecks: 25 April 1847
Ship	State	Description
Treby	United Kingdom	The brig was wrecked off Cape Luke, Ottoman Tripolitania. Her crew were rescued.
Wilhelmina	Kingdom of Hanover	The koff capsized and was driven ashore on Süderoog, Duchy of Holstein. She was on a voyage from a Norwegian port to Leer.

== 26 April ==
List of shipwrecks: 26 April 1847
Ship	State	Description
Atalanta	Malta	The schooner ran aground at Smyrna, Ottoman Empire. She was refloated.
Petronella	United Kingdom	The ship ran aground on the Meven Sand, in the North Sea. She was on a voyage from Glasgow, Renfrewshire to Cuxhaven. She was refloated and taken in to Cuxhaven.
Queen Victoria	United Kingdom	The ship was driven ashore at Norfolk, Virginia, United States.
Valiant	United Kingdom	The ship was driven ashore on Scattery Island, County Clare. She was refloated on 6 May.

== 27 April ==
List of shipwrecks: 27 April 1847
Ship	State	Description
Argo	United States	The ship struck an iceberg and was abandoned in the Atlantic Ocean. Her crew were rescued. She was on a voyage from Baltimore, Maryland to Cork, United Kingdom.
Conradine	Bremen	The ship was driven ashore in Loch Indaal. She was on a voyage from New Orleans, Louisiana, United States to Sligo, United Kingdom.
Demetri	Trieste	The ship ran aground near Tarifa, Spain and was wrecked. She was on a voyage from Trieste to Cork, United Kingdom.
Emily	United Kingdom	The smack was driven ashore and wrecked at Downings, County Donegal. Her crew were rescued.
Firefly	United Kingdom	The ship was driven ashore and severely damaged at Boulmer, Northumberland.
Fisher	United Kingdom	The brig was driven ashore in Loch Indaal. She was on a voyage from Liverpool, Lancashire to Newfoundland, British North America. She was refloated on 14 May.
General von Thom	United Kingdom	The ship was driven ashore in Lowland Man's Bay, Jura, Inner Hebrides. She was on a voyage from Liverpool to Stralsund.
Hunter	United Kingdom	The ship foundered in the English Channel between Dungeness, Kent and Beachy Head, Sussex. Her crew were rescued. She was on a voyage from Caen, Calvados, France to London.
Mariner	United Kingdom	The ship was driven ashore at Waterville, County Kerry with the loss of two of her crew.
Mary Ann	United Kingdom	The ship was driven ashore in Loch Indaal. She was on a voyage from Ayr to Loch Indaal.
Matthew Pearce	United Kingdom	The ship was wrecked off Punta Real Island, in the Bay of Laguna. Her crew were rescued. She was on a voyage from Saint Thomas, Virgin Islands to Laguna.
Messenger	United Kingdom	The schooner was driven ashore and wrecked at Downings. Her crew were rescued. She was on a voyage from A Coruña, Spain to Sligo. The wreck was plundered by the local inhabitants.
Olive Branch	United Kingdom	The schooner was driven ashore at Bowmore, Islay. She was on a voyage from Liverpool to Ballyshannon, County Antrim. Olive Branch was refloated on 14 May.
Success	United Kingdom	The sloop was driven ashore and wrecked at Appin, Argyllshire. Her crew were rescued. She was on a voyage from Ballachulish, Argyllshire to Glasgow, Renfrewshire.
Tyrian	United Kingdom	The ship foundered off Jura with the loss of all hands. She was on a voyage from Baltimore, Maryland, United States to Glasgow.
William Carson	United Kingdom	The ship was driven ashore in Lowland Man's Bay.

== 28 April ==
List of shipwrecks: 28 April 1847
Ship	State	Description
Exmouth	United Kingdom	The barque was wrecked on Islay, Inner Hebrides with the loss of 249 of the 252 people on board. She was on a voyage from Londonderry to Quebec City, Province of Canada, British North America.
Helena	Denmark	The ship was abandoned off Barra, Outer Hebrides, United Kingdom. Her crew were rescued. She was subsequently taken in to Vaterta Bay.
Helen Cook	United Kingdom	The schooner sprang a leak and was abandoned in the North Sea 40 nautical miles (74 km) east by south of Tynemouth Castle, Northumberland. Her crew were rescued by the schooner Dorothea (United Kingdom). Helen Cook was on a voyage from Dundee, Forfarshire to Hull, Yorkshire. She subsequently capsized and caught fire.
Kangaroo	United Kingdom	The ship was wrecked at "Aughrish". Her crew were rescued. She was on a voyage from Limerick to Newport, Monmouthshire.
Mary Isabella	United Kingdom	The ship foundered in the Bristol Channel off Lundy Island, Devon. Her crew were rescued by Clara (United Kingdom).
Olivia	United States	The schooner was wrecked at the Slyne Head Lighthouse, County Donegal, United Kingdom with the loss of two of her crew. She was on a voyage from New York to Galway, United Kingdom. The wreck was plundered by the local inhabitants.

== 29 April ==
List of shipwrecks: 29 April 1847
Ship	State	Description
Daniel Norris	United Kingdom	The ship was driven ashore on the west coast of Jutland. She was refloated and taken in to Aalborg, Denmark.
Delegate	United States	The fishing schooner was lost the Georges Bank. Crew saved by schooner Talisman.
Fellowship	United Kingdom	The ship was beached at Tobermory, Isle of Mull. She was on a voyage from Liverpool, Lancashire to Prince Edward Island, British North America.
John and Isabella	United Kingdom	The ship struck a sunken rock and was beached on Flotta, Orkney Islands. She was on a voyage from Newcastle upon Tyne, Northumberland to Dublin.
Moy	United Kingdom	The ship was driven ashore on Scattery Island, County Clare. She was on a voyage from Kilrush, County Clare to Arkhangelsk, Russia. She was refloated and resumed her voyage.
Trefiw Trader	United Kingdom	The sloop foundered off the coast of Anglesey. Her crew survived. She was on a voyage from Holyhead to Pwllfanogl.

== 30 April ==
List of shipwrecks: 30 April 1847
Ship	State	Description
Experiment	United Kingdom	The screw steamer caught fire and sank in the North Sea off Aldeburgh, Suffolk. All 80 people on board were rescued by the paddle steamer Clarence (United Kingdom). Experiment was on a voyage from Sunderland, County Durham to London.
Union	United Kingdom	The ship foundered in the Irish Sea off Douglas Head, Isle of Man. Her crew were rescued by Emily (United Kingdom). Union was on a voyage from Barrow-in-Furness, Lancashire to Port Talbot, Glamorgan.

== Unknown date ==
List of shipwrecks: Unknown date in April 1847
Ship	State	Description
Antelope	(United Kingdom of Great Britain and Ireland) British North America	The schooner was abandoned in the Atlantic Ocean before 22 April.
Brothers	(United Kingdom of Great Britain and Ireland) British North America	The ship was abandoned in the Atlantic Ocean before 3 April.
Catharine	United Kingdom	The ship was wrecked on a reef off Cape San Antonio, Cuba before 8 April. Her crew were rescued. She was on a voyage from Jamaica to Glasgow, Renfrewshire.
Charles	United Kingdom	The barque was abandoned in the Atlantic Ocean before 15 April.
Christine Maria	Flag unknown	The sloop was wrecked on the Rouer Scheern before 25 April with the loss of all hands.
Crusader	(United Kingdom of Great Britain and Ireland) British North America	The ship was abandoned in the Atlantic Ocean before 9 April. Her crew were rescued by Cronstadt (Russia). Crusader was on a voyage from Philadelphia, Pennsylvania, United States to Liverpool, Lancashire.
Elwine	Stettin	The schooner capsized at "Summerfocht" before 17 April. She had been refloated by 3 May and taken in to Swinemünde, Prussia.
Ireby	United Kingdom	The ship struck a sunken rock and foundered in the Mediterranean Sea 2 nautical miles (3.7 km) west of "Port Saloume" Egypt. Her crew were rescued. She was on a voyage from Sunderland, County Durham to Alexandria, Egypt.
Israel	United States	The whaler was driven ashore at the Cape of Good Hope, Cape Colony before 14 April.
Jane	United Kingdom	The brig ran aground on the Gunfleet Sand, in the North Sea off the coast of Essex. She subsequently broke up. Her crew were rescued.
Mary and Eliza	United Kingdom	The ship was abandoned before 3 April.
Mermaid	United Kingdom	The ship was wrecked at the "Malabar Castle", China between 19 and 23 April.
Mitchel	United Kingdom	The smack was abandoned in the North Sea. She was subsequently taken in to Whitby, Yorkshire.
Nowrojee's Botella	India	The ship was wrecked off the Malabar Coast between 18 and 21 April.
Prince of Wales	United Kingdom	The ship was wrecked on the coast of Madagascar before 27 April. She was on a voyage Bay of St. Augustin to Mauritius.
Siband Pulkee	India	The patamar foundered off "Jageer" between 18 and 21 April. She was on a voyage from Calicut to Bombay.
Sisters	United Kingdom	The schooner departed from Kirkcaldy, Fife for Donegal. No further trace, presumed foundered with the loss of all hands.
Solide	Prussia	The barque sank off Caorle, Kingdom of Lombardy–Venetia before 3 April. Her crew were rescued. She was on a voyage from Trieste to L'Orient, Morbihan, France.
Victoria	India	The ship was severely damaged in a hurricane.
Wanderer	United Kingdom	The ship was lost off Hanko, Grand Duchy of Finland. She was on a voyage from Hartlepool, County Durham to Kronstadt, Russia.
Witburn	United Kingdom	The ship was driven ashore and wrecked at Whitby, Yorkshire before 12 April.
