= List of shipwrecks in November 1869 =

The list of shipwrecks in November 1869 includes ships sunk, foundered, grounded, or otherwise lost during November 1869.

== 1 November ==
List of shipwrecks: 1 November 1869
Ship	State	Description
Birkeberneren	Norway	The ship was wrecked at "Torrevega".
Brotherton	United Kingdom	The steamship was driven ashore near Dénia, Spain.
Caduceus	United Kingdom	The ship was driven ashore and severely damaged on "Paschanoi Ostrow", Russia. She had been refloated by 7 November and taken in to Kertch for repairs.
Elise	Prussia	The ship was driven ashore at Rossitten. She was on a voyage from Memel to Grimsby, Lincolnshire, United Kingdom.
Eupatoria	United Kingdom	The ship was driven ashore and severely damaged on "Paschanoi Ostrow". She had been refloated by 7 November and taken in to Kertch for repairs.
Johann	Sweden	The schooner was abandoned in the North Sea. Her crew were rescued by Havfruen (Denmark). Johann was on a voyage from Sunderland, County Durham, United Kingdom to Uddevalla.
Lotus	United Kingdom	The schooner was wrecked on the Cantle Reef, in the Orkney Islands. Her crew were rescued. She was on a voyage from Runcorn, Cheshire to Kirkwall, Orkney Islands.
Louisa	United Kingdom	The schooner was driven ashore and wrecked near Ballintrae, Ayrshire. Her crew were rescued. She was on a voyage from Belfast, County Antrim to Ayr.
Mackerele	Bremen	The sloop was abandoned in the North Sea 20 nautical miles (37 km) off Borkum, Prussia with the loss of her captain.
Maria Mathilda	Norway	The ship was wrecked at "Torrevega".
Mary Campbell	United Kingdom	The ship foundered. Her crew were rescued. She was on a voyage from Lagos to London.
Nestor	United Kingdom	The steamship was driven ashore on Saaremaa, Russia. Her crew were rescued.
Niord	United Kingdom	The ship was lost near Vlissingen, Zeeland, Netherlands.
Solide	Sweden	The brig ran aground on the Kentish Knock. Her crew were taken off, but her captain remained on board. She was on a voyage from Sundsvall to Paimbœuf, Loire-Inférieure, France. She was refloated the next day and taken in to Harwich, Essex, United Kingdom in a waterlogged condition.
Venus	Norway	The brig was driven ashore at Calais, France.
West Riding	United Kingdom	The ship was driven ashore at Akyab, Burma. She was refloated and put back to Akyab.

== 2 November ==
List of shipwrecks: 2 November 1869
Ship	State	Description
Alma, and Vedra	Italy; United Kingdom	The barque Alma collided with Vedra and was beached at Great Yarmouth, Norfolk. Vedra was on a voyage from South Shields, County Durham to Colchester, Essex. She was taken in to Great Yarmouth in a severely damaged condition
Bayard, and James Livesey	United Kingdom	Bayard collided with James Livesey in the River Mersey. Both vessels were severely damaged. Bayard was on a voyage from Birkenhead, Cheshire to Liverpool, Lancashire. James Livesey was on a voyage from Liverpool to Calcutta, India. She put back to Liverpool.
Caduceus	United Kingdom	The ship was driven ashore at Taganrog, Russia.
Derwent	United Kingdom	The schooner ran aground on the Holywood Bank, in the Belfast Lough. She was on a voyage from Belfast to Whitehead, County Antrim.
Fanny Ealer	United States	The ship was driven ashore at Bremerhaven. She was on a voyage from New Orleans, Louisiana to Bremen. She was refloated on 9 November and taken in to Bremen.
George Canning	United Kingdom	The brig was driven ashore and wrecked at Conway, Caernarfonshire. Her crew were rescued. She was on a voyage from Amlwch, Anglesey to Runcorn, Cheshire.
Hope	United Kingdom	The schooner was wrecked. She was on a voyage from Dundalk, County Louth to Troon, Ayrshire.
Hermione	United Kingdom	The schooner ran aground on The Shingles, off the Isle of Wight. She was on a voyage from Belfast, County Antrim to a Mediterranean port. She was refloated that day, resuming her voyage on 4 November.
Jacoba Catherina	Netherlands	The galiot sprang a leak and foundered in the English Channel 4 nautical miles (7.4 km) south east of Weymouth, Dorset, United Kingdom with the loss of four of her six crew. She was on a voyage from South Shields, County Durham, United Kingdom to Barcelona, Spain.
Mary	United Kingdom	The ship was driven ashore and damaged at Bremerhaven.
Myrah	Canada	The ship was driven ashore at Malin Head, County Donegal, United Kingdom. She was on a voyage from Boston, Massachusetts, United States to Cape Cove.
Saint Pierre d'Arrena	Italy	The barque caught fire and foundered 183 nautical miles (339 km) south of the Cape Verde Islands. Her crew were rescued.
Senba	(Russian Empire) Grand Duchy of Finland	The brig was driven ashore on Heligoland. Her crew were rescued. She was on a voyage from Newcastle upon Tyne, Northumberland to Pori.
Sunshine	United Kingdom	The brig foundered in the Atlantic Ocean. Her crew were rescued by Duck (Bremen) and Nicolaus (Flag unknown). Sunshine was on a voyage from Taganrog to Falmouth, Cornwall.

== 3 November ==
List of shipwrecks: 3 November 1869
Ship	State	Description
Athenaise	United Kingdom	The ship ran aground in Lake St. Peter. She was on a voyage from Montreal, Quebec, Canada to London. She was refloated and resumed her voyage.
Catharina	Netherlands	The schooner was driven ashore at Llandudno, Caernarfonshire, United Kingdom. Her five crew were rescued by the Llandudno Lifeboat Sisters' Memorial ( Royal National Lifeboat Institution). Catharina was on a voyage from Runcorn, Cheshire, United Kingdom to Riga, Russia.
Eleanor	United Kingdom	The ship ran aground on the Pencil Rocks. She was on a voyage from Quebec City, Canada to Cardiff, Glamorgan.
Klipparu	Russia	The schooner collided with the schooner Sylvester (United Kingdom) and was abandoned off Utklippan, Sweden. Her crew were rescued by Sylvester. Klipparu was on a voyage from Kristiansand, Norway to Lübeck.
Louise	United Kingdom	The ship was driven ashore and wrecked in Correry Bay, Wigtownshire.
Mary	United Kingdom	The ship was driven ashore at Geestemünde.
St. Brennock	United Kingdom	The steamship caught fire at Preston, Lancashire.
Swiftsure	United Kingdom	The ship ran aground 1.5 nautical miles (2.8 km) off Margate, Kent. Twelve passengers were taken off by the lugger Lively (United Kingdom). The lifeboats Friend of all Nations (United Kingdom) and Quiver ( Royal National Lifeboat Institution) also attended. Swiftsure was on a voyage from Melbourne, Victoria to London. She was refloated the next day and taken in tow for London.
HMS Thistle	Royal Navy	The Beacon-class gunvessel suffered a boiler explosion in the Thames Estuary killing ten of her crew and severely wounding ten. The injured were transferred to Sheerness Dockyard by the tug Rescue (United Kingdom). HMS Thistle was subsequently towed in to Sheerness by Rescue and another tug.

== 4 November ==
List of shipwrecks: 4 November 1869
Ship	State	Description
Alexandra	United Kingdom	The ship was driven ashore at Venus Point, Georgia, United States. She was on a voyage from Savannah, Georgia to Liverpool, Lancashire. She was refloated on 22 November and put back to Savannah for repairs.
Ann	United Kingdom	The schooner was wrecked at Whitehaven, Cumberland. Her crew were rescued by rocket apparatus. She was on a voyage from Ramsey, Isle of Man to Whitehaven.
Avon	United Kingdom	The steamship collided with the steamship Athlete and was beached at Bristol, Gloucestershire. Avon was on a voyage from Bristol to Newport, Monmouthshire. She was repaired in situ and resumed her voyage on 20 November.
Bravo	Danzig	The sloop was abandoned off Pillau, Prussia. Her crew were rescued. She was on a voyage from Danzigto an English port. She came ashore at "Nimmersalt".
Catharina	Netherlands	The brigantine was wrecked at Llandudno, Caernarfonshire, United Kingdom. Her five crew were rescued by the Llandudno Lifeboat Sisters' Memorial ( Royal National Lifeboat Institution). Catharina was on a voyage from Runcorn, Cheshire, United Kingdom to Riga, Russia.
Ellen and Esther	United Kingdom	The schooner ran aground and was wrecked on Sarn Badrig. Her crew survived. She was on a voyage from Portmadoc, Caernarfonshire to London.
Emden	Prussia	The schooner was abandoned in the North Sea. Her four crew were rescued by the fishing lugger Bon Pasteur (France).
Fanny	United Kingdom	The ship was driven ashore at Rostock.
Farmer's Lass	United Kingdom	The brigantine foundered off Cape Sacratif, Spain. Her seven crew were rescued by the barque Czarovitz (United Kingdom). Farmer's Lass was on a voyage from Swansea, Glamorgan to Naples, Italy.
Iris	United Kingdom	The ship was driven onto the Brest Rocks, on the coast of Ayrshire. She was on a voyage from Dublin to Ayr.
Jane Fish	United Kingdom	The ship ran aground at New York, United States. She was on a voyage from Liverpool, Lancashire to New York. She was later refloated.
Margaret	United Kingdom	The brigantine foundered. Her crew survived. She was on a voyage from Portland, Dorset to London.
Mary	United Kingdom	The ship was driven ashore and damaged at Rostock.
Prins Carl	Norway	The brig was driven ashore on the coast of Somerset, United Kingdom. She was on a voyage from Kronstadt, Russia to Gloucester, United Kingdom. She was refloated and taken in to Bristol, Gloucestershire.
Sarah Garcia	United Kingdom	The steamship was wrecked on the Île de Trielen, Finistère, France. Her crew were rescued. She was on a voyage from Málaga, Spain to London.
Swiftsure	United Kingdom	The ship ran aground off Margate, Kent. She was on a voyage from Australia to London. She was refloated and taken in tow for London.
Whitehaven	United Kingdom	The brig was driven ashore and wrecked at Whitehaven. Her crew were rescued.
Wyborg	United Kingdom	The steamship was holed by her anchor and sank in the River Usk.
Ybarra	Spain	The steamship struck the quayside and sank at Newport, Monmouthshire, United Kingdom. She was on a voyage from Bilbao to Newport.
Unnamed	Flag unknown	The ship foundered off Northam, Devon, United Kingdom.

== 5 November ==
List of shipwrecks: 5 November 1869
Ship	State	Description
Anne Gabrielle	France	The derelict barque sank in tie Atlantic Ocean.
Cambrian	United Kingdom	The brig was driven ashore at Waterloo, Lancashire. She was on a voyage from Dublin to Whitehaven, Cumberland. She was refloated and towed in to Liverpool.
Equator	Netherlands	The ship was driven ashore and wrecked at Lemvig, Denmark. She was on a voyage from London, United Kingdom to a port in Norway.
Flying Huntsman	United Kingdom	The tug sank in the Clyde. Her crew were rescued.
Helene	Prussia	The schooner sank off "Bruster Orf". She was on a voyage from Königsberg to an English port.
Kate	United Kingdom	The brigantine struck the Patrick Rock, off the coast of County Down and sank. Her crew were rescued. She was on a voyage from Dublin to Ardrossan, Ayrshire.
Livonia	United Kingdom	The steamship was abandoned in the North Sea. Her crew were rescued by the smack Alfred (United Kingdom). Livonia was on a voyage from Sunderland, County Durham to Kronstadt, Russia. Although taken in tow by two smacks, she foundered.
Margaret	United Kingdom	The schooner foundered off Blacktail Sand, in the Thames Estuary. Her crew were rescued by John and Jane (United Kingdom). She was on a voyage from Portland, Dorset to London.
New Unity	United Kingdom	The schooner was driven ashore 5 nautical miles (9.3 km) north of Scarborough, Yorkshire. She was refloated on 4 January 1870 and towed in to Scarborough in a severely damaged condition.
Star	United Kingdom	The ship was driven ashore at Burnham-on-Sea, Somerset.
Themis	Canada	The ship ran aground in the Llanhiden Channel. She was on a voyage from Saint John, New Brunswick to Caernarfon, United Kingdom.
William	United Kingdom	The schooner was wrecked on the Faggot Rock. Her crew were rescued. She was on a voyage from Peterhead, Aberdeenshire to Sunderland, County Durham.
Unnamed	Flag unknown	The ship foundered in the Dogger Bank. Her crew were rescued.
Two unnamed vessels	Flags unknown	The ships were driven ashore at Ringkøbing, Denmark.

== 6 November ==
List of shipwrecks: 6 November 1869
Ship	State	Description
Carmine	United Kingdom	The ship was wrecked on the coast of Italy with the loss of six of her crew. She was on a voyage from Newport, Monmouthshire to Genoa, Italy.
Ebenezer	United Kingdom	The brig was wrecked on the east coast of Bornholm, Denmark. Her crew were rescued. She was on a voyage from Kronstadt, Russia to London.
Fair Wind	United Kingdom	The schooner ran aground on the Ravnen Sandbank, north of Dragør, Denmark. She was on a voyage from Hartlepool, County Durham to Stettin. She was refloated and put in to Helsingør, Denmark the next day.
Flash	United Kingdom	The schooner ran aground in Duncannon Bay and was damaged. She was refloated and put back to Waterford.
Harvard	United Kingdom	The steamship ran aground near Hellevoetsluis, Zeeland, Netherlands. She was on a voyage from Grangemouth, Stirlingshire to Gothenburg, Sweden.
Her Majesty	Canada	The steamship was wrecked at Whitehead, Nova Scotia. She was on a voyage from Pictou, Nova Scotia to Montreal, Quebec.
Inchiquin	Canada	The ship was abandoned in the Atlantic Ocean. Her crew were rescued by George (United Kingdom). Inchiquin was on a voyage from Quebec City to Limerick, United Kingdom.
Thomas Bayley	United Kingdom	The steamship ran aground and was wrecked at Lagos, Africa.
W. A. Banks	United States	The ship was wrecked in the Strait of Juan de Fuca. Her crew were rescued.
Watermillock	United Kingdom	The brig was driven ashore at Sea Palling, Norfolk. Her six crew were rescued by the Palling Lifeboat Parsee ( Royal National Lifeboat Institution).

== 7 November ==
List of shipwrecks: 7 November 1869
Ship	State	Description
Peveril of the Peak	United Kingdom	The ship ran aground at Greenock, Renfrewshire. She was refloated.
Venezia	Trieste	The steamship ran ashore on Cres, Greece. She was on a voyage from Pula, Austria-Hungary to Cres.

== 8 November ==
List of shipwrecks: 8 November 1869
Ship	State	Description
Alacer	United Kingdom	The ship was driven ashore at Margate, Kent. She was on a voyage from Boulogne, Pas-de-Calais, France to London. She was refloated and taken in to Margate.
Brence	Belgium	The ship was driven ashore at Zoutelande, Zeeland, Netherlands. She was on a voyage from Antwerp to Havana, Cuba.
Broedertrouw	Netherlands	The ship was wrecked near Varberg, Sweden. Her crew were rescued. She was on a voyage from Memel, Prussia to Groningen.
City of Bengal	United Kingdom	The ship foundered in the North Sea off the coast of Prussia. There were at least two survivors. She was on a voyage from Liverpool to Jakobstad, Finland.
Corsica	United Kingdom	The ship was driven ashore at Les Escoumins, Quebec, Canada. She was on a voyage from Montreal, Quebec to Liverpool.
Cupid	United States	The ship put in to Fahrwasser Bay on fire. She was on a voyage from New York to Danzig.
Da Capo	France	The ship was wrecked on the Norapa Reef. She was on a voyage from Dunkirk, Nord to Riga, Russia.
Emma	Sweden	The ship ran aground on the Jord Sand, in the North Sea. She was on a voyage from Malmö to Maroni, Cyprus. She was refloated on 7 December and taken in to Wyk auf Föhr, Prussia in a leaky condition and placed under repair.
Ithuriel	United Kingdom	The brigantine was driven ashore and wrecked near Ballintrae, Ayrshire with the loss of all hands.
Lark	United Kingdom	The brig was wrecked at Cimbritshamn, Sweden. Her crew were rescued. She was on a voyage from Kronstadt, Russia to an English port.
Lotus	United Kingdom	The ship was wrecked near Öregrund, Sweden.
Minniehaha	United States	The ship ran aground in the River Foyle between Culmore, County Londonderry and Moville, County Donegal, United Kingdom. She was on a voyage from Baltimore, Maryland to Londonderry.
Montrose	United Kingdom	The ship ran aground on the Pluckington Bank, in Liverpool Bay. She was on a voyage from Baltimore, Maryland, United States to Liverpool, Lancashire. She was refloated and taken in to Liverpool.
Mystic	United Kingdom	The brigantine sprang a leak and was beached at Dymchurch, Kent. She was on a voyage from London to Demerara, British Guiana. She was refloated with assistance from the Coastguard and taken in to Dover, Kent.
Orion	Sweden	The schooner was abandoned in the Baltic Sea off Öland. Her crew were rescued by the steamship Nero (United Kingdom). Orion was on a voyage from Skellefteå to "Apernad".
Taurus	United Kingdom	The ship was driven ashore. She was on a voyage from a Baltic port to Bordeaux, Gironde, France.
St. Patrick	United Kingdom	The ship was wrecked near Ljusne, Sweden.
Walter Stanhope	United Kingdom	The steamship ran aground on the Haisborough Sands, in the North Sea off the coast of Norfolk. She was on a voyage from Goole, Yorkshire to Antwerp, Belgium. She was refloated and taken in to Lowestoft, Suffolk in a leaky condition.

== 9 November ==
List of shipwrecks: 9 November 1869
Ship	State	Description
Bantam	Netherlands	The ship was driven ashore at Allinge, Denmark. She was on a voyage from Riga, Russia to Amsterdam, North Holland.
Camelia	United Kingdom	The ship was driven ashore near Alkmaar, North Holland, Netherlands and was wrecked. Her crew were rescued. She was on a voyage from Dunkirk, Nord, France to an English port.
Catherine and Isabella	United Kingdom	The ship was driven ashore and wrecked on the Isle of Arran.
Elina	United Kingdom	The ship sank near Danzig. She was on a voyage from Königsberg, Prussa to an English port.
Magnifique	United Kingdom	The ship was driven ashore on Vlieland, Friesland, Netherlands. She was on a voyage from Vyborg, Grand Duchy of Finland to London.
Mary	United Kingdom	The ship was driven ashore at Allinge. She was on a voyage from Vyborg to Whitby, Yorkshire.
Orpen	Flag unknown	The brig was driven ashore near "Penesse".
Pilot	United States	The schooner was wrecked on the Anderson Rocks, off the Star Island Shoals.
Regana	United Kingdom	The ship was driven ashore at Cape Henry, Virginia, United States. She was on a voyage from Baltimore, Maryland, United States to Liverpool.
Sophie	Norway	The brig collided with the steamship Behaide (France) and sank in the English Channel 2 nautical miles (3.7 km) off Dungeness, Kent, United Kingdom with the loss of a crew member. Survivors were rescued by Behaide. Sophie was on a voyage from Morlaix, Finistère, France to Fredrikstad.

== 10 November ==
List of shipwrecks: 10 November 1869
Ship	State	Description
City of Lahore	United Kingdom	The ship was driven ashore between Crosby and Waterloo, Lancashire. She was on a voyage from Bombay, India to Liverpool, Lancashire. She was refloated the next day and taken in to Liverpool.
Cuba	United States	The ship was wrecked at Holyhead, Anglesey, United Kingdom with the loss of eight of the thirteen people on board. Survivors were rescued by the Coastguard using rocket apparatus. She was on a voyage from New York to Dublin, United Kingdom. She was discovered in a capsized condition 7 nautical miles (13 km) off Holyhead, Anglesey on 9 December and taken in tow for Holyhead by the tug Fury (United Kingdom).
Dunnottar Castle	United Kingdom	The ship was destroyed by fire at Zierikzee, Zeeland, Netherlands. She was on a voyage from "Hay" to Newcastle upon Tyne, Northumberland.
Pacific	United Kingdom	The barque ran aground at Workington, Cumberland. She was on a voyage from Maryport, Cumberland to Belfast, County Antrim. She was refloated and taken in to Workington in a severely leaky condition.
Skulda	Flag unknown	The schooner collided with a brig and was abandoned by her seven crew. Three were rescued by the brig, four by the steamship Dresden (Flag unknown). Skulda was on a voyage from Saint Petersburg, Russia to London, United Kingdom. She was towed in to Copenhagen, Denmark by Dresden.
Wasp	United Kingdom	The ship was wrecked or the Manicougan Shoals, in the Saint Lawrence River. Her crew were rescued. She was on a voyage from Montreal, Canada to Bristol, Gloucestershire.
Wave	United Kingdom	The schooner ran aground on the Holme Sand, in the North Sea off the coast of Suffolk.

== 11 November ==
List of shipwrecks: 11 November 1869
Ship	State	Description
Eliza Catherine	Canada	The schooner was wrecked. She was on a voyage from Halifax to Sydney, Nova Scotia.
Emilie	France	The ship was driven ashore near Dunkirk, Nord. She was on a voyage from Ténès, Algeria to Dunkirk.
Enterprise	United Kingdom	The ship was destroyed by fire in the Atlantic Ocean. Her crew were rescued by Auriga (United Kingdom). Enterprise was on a voyage from Sunderland, County Durham to St-Paul de Loanda, Portuguese West Africa.
Hannah	Norway	The barque was driven ashore at Grainthorpe, Lincolnshire, United Kingdom. Her crew were rescued by the Donna Nook Lifeboat North Briton ( Royal National Lifeboat Institution). Hannah was on a voyage from Gothenburg, Sweden to South Shields, County Durham.
Hollander	Netherlands	The steamship was driven ashore near Bandholm, Denmark. She was on a voyage from Kronstadt, Russia to Rotterdam, South Holland.
Janet Forbes	United Kingdom	The ship was driven ashore at Low Point, Cape Breton Island, Nova Scotia. She was on a voyage from London to Pictou, Nova Scotia.
Lotus	United Kingdom	The ship was wrecked. She was on a voyage from Runcorn, Cheshire to Kirkwall, Orkney Islands.
Marie Borgo	Denmark	The ship was wrecked.
Nathalie	Belgium	The ship was driven ashore at Bandholm. She was on a voyage from Riga, Russia to Antwerp.
Result	United Kingdom	The ship was driven ashore on Spiekeroog, Prussia. Her crew were rescued.

== 12 November ==
List of shipwrecks: 12 November 1869
Ship	State	Description
Breeze	United Kingdom	The brigantine sprang a leak and was abandoned 3 leagues (9 nautical miles (17 km)) south of Maughold Head, Isle of Man. Her eight crew reached took to a boat; they landed at Ramsey, Isle of Man. She was on a voyage from Liverpool, Lancashire to Trinidad de Cuba, Cuba.
Demetrius	United Kingdom	The ship ran aground on the Dolga Spit, in the Sea of Azov. She was refloated on 18 November and towed in to Berdyansk, Russia.
De Salaberry	United Kingdom	The ship ran aground on the Trinity Sand, in the North Sea off the coast of Lincolnshire. She was on a voyage from Callao, Peru to South Shields, County Durham. She was refloated and taken in to Grimsby, Lincolnshire.
Maitland	United Kingdom	The ship was driven ashore at Limehouse, Middlesex. She was on a voyage from London to Sunderland, County Durham.
Minerve	France	The ship caught fire at St. Jago de Cuba, Cuba and was scuttled. She was on a voyage from Leith, Lothian, United Kingdom to St. Jago de Cuba.
Niord	United Kingdom	The steamship collided with the steamship Esk (United Kingdom) and sank in the River Thames. Niord was on a voyage from Vyborg, Grand Duchy of Finland to Liverpool.
Sovereign	United Kingdom	The schooner collided with the steamship Trevithick (United Kingdom) and sank in the River Thames at Gravesend, Kent. Her crew were rescued. Sovereign was on a voyage from London to Leith, Lothian.

== 13 November ==
List of shipwrecks: 13 November 1869
Ship	State	Description
Hopewell	United Kingdom	The schooner foundered in the North Sea. Her crew survived. She was on a voyage from London to Dordrecht, South Holland, Netherlands.
J. and W. Pitt	Canada	The ship was abandoned in a sinking condition. Her crew were rescued by Delta ( Canada. J. and W. Pitt was on a voyage from Saint John's, Newfoundland Colony to Bayfield, Nova Scotia.
Mallowdale	United Kingdom	The ship was driven ashore at Lancaster, Lancashire. She was refloated on 15 November.
Orion	Lübeck	The steamship ran aground west of Skagen, Denmark. She was on a voyage from Newcastle upon Tyne, Northumberland, United Kingdom to Riga, Russia. She had become a wreck by 15 November.
Pia	United Kingdom	The schooner collided with a brig and sank in the North Sea 5 nautical miles (9.3 km) off Whitby, Yorkshire with the loss of all hands. She was on a voyage from Falmouth, Cornwall to Stockholm, Sweden.
St. Areta	Spain	The brigantine was wrecked near Carmarthen, United Kingdom. Her crew were rescued by the Carmarthen Lifeboat City of Manchester ( Royal National Lifeboat Institution). St. Areta was on a voyage from Santander, Spain to Swansea, Glamorgan, United Kingdom.

== 14 November ==
List of shipwrecks: 14 November 1869
Ship	State	Description
Beraza, and Prince	Norway; United Kingdom	The barque Beraza and the steamship Prince collided at the mouth of the Humber. Beraza was abandoned by all but one of her crew, who were rescued by Prince. She was subsequently boarded by two crew of the fishing smack Burton Constable (United Kingdom) then reboarded by her own crew, who forcibly evicted the fishermen. The fishermen claimed that they had prevented the barque from being wrecked on the Stoney Binks by anchoring her. A claim for salvage was refused by her captain and Beraza resumed her voyage. Prince was on a voyage from Dunkirk, Nord, France to Hull, Yorkshire. She put in to Hull severely damaged at the bow.
Catherine	Italy	The ship struck a rock and sank off the Canadian coast with the loss of all but one of her crew. She was on a voyage from Genoa to Quebec City, Canada.
Crescent City	United Kingdom	The ship was abandoned in the Atlantic Ocean. Her crew were rescued by the barque Mary Sparks (United Kingdom). Crescent City was on a voyage from Savannah, Georgia, United States to Liverpool, Lancashire.
James	United Kingdom	The smack struck floating wreckage and foundered off the North Foreland, Kent with the loss of two of her crew. She was on a voyage from Fécamp, Seine-Inférieure, France to London.
J. T. A.	Spain	The ship was driven ashore at Laugharne, Glamorgan, United Kingdom. Her crew were rescued. She was on a voyage from Santander, Spain to Swansea, Glamorgan.
Laurel	United Kingdom	The brig foundered off the Calf of Man, Isle of Man. Her crew were rescued. She was on a voyage from Whitehaven, Cumberland to Dublin.
Rina	United Kingdom	The ship was wrecked at Hook of Holland, South Holland, Netherlands. Her crew were rescued. She was on a voyage from Rochester, Kent to Rotterdam, South Holland.

== 15 November ==
List of shipwrecks: 15 November 1869
Ship	State	Description
Alonso	Canada	The barque was driven ashore and wrecked on Heligoland. Her crew were rescued.
Andrea	Spain	The ship was lost near Alicante.
Boreas	Netherlands	The galiot sank near Hellevoetsluis, Zeeland.
Dispatch	United Kingdom	The ship ran aground near Amble, Northumberland. Her crew survived. She was on a voyage from Sunderland, County Durham to Leith, Lothian. She was refloated and taken in to Amble.
Dumont D'Urville	France	The barque was lost near Zanzibar. She was on a voyage from Lamu, Sultanate of Zanzibar to Zanzibar.
Economie	United Kingdom	The ship foundered off Sylt, Prussia. She was on a voyage from Burntisland, Fife to Christiania, Norway.
Europa	Denmark	The ship ran aground and sank at Dover, Kent, United Kingdom. She was on a voyage from Faaborg to Barrow-in-Furness, Lancashire, United Kingdom.
Janny Fancy	United Kingdom	The ship sank in the North Sea off Norderney, Prussia with the loss of six of her eight crew. She was on a voyage from Sunderland, County Durham to Hamburg.
Ganymede	United Kingdom	The schooner was driven ashore near Waterloo, Lancashire. She was on a voyage from Jersey, Channel Islands to Liverpool, Lancashire. She broke in two on 22 November and was wrecked.
Minerva	United Kingdom	The ship was lost whilst on a voyage from Colón, United States of Colombia to "Boca de Tois".
HMS Prince Consort	Royal Navy	The Prince Consort-class ironclad ran aground at the entrance to the Suez Canal. She was refloated.
HMS Royal Oak	Royal Navy	The Prince Consort-class ironclad ran aground at the entrance to the Suez Canal. She was refloated.
S. G. Troop	United Kingdom	The ship was destroyed by fire at Milford Haven, Pembrokeshire.

== 16 November ==
List of shipwrecks: 16 November 1869
Ship	State	Description
Adell	United States	With a cargo of wood aboard, the 48-foot (15 m), 24.7-gross register ton two-masted schooner came ashore and was wrecked in Milwaukee Bay at Bay View, Milwaukee, Wisconsin, at 43°01.033′N 087°53.296′W during a gale. Some questions exists as to the ship's identity, as a schooner named Adell also was reported to have sunk at Sheboygan, Wisconsin, during the storm, and reports of losses during the gale include a schooner Adell with a home port at Sheboygan and a schooner Adell, possibly of Canadian registry, with a home port at Port Burnell, Ontario, Canada. All schooners identified as Adell were described as constructed at Milwaukee in 1860.
Anna	United Kingdom	The collier, a brig, was wrecked on the Banjaard Sand, off the Dutch coast with the loss of two of her eight crew. She was on a voyage from Newcastle upon Tyne, Northumberland to Rotterdam, South Holland, Netherlands.
Lina, or Rina	Prussia	The ship sprang a leak in the North Sea and was abandoned by her crew, who were rescued by a Norwegian vessel. She was on a voyage from South Shields, County Durham, United Kingdom to New York, United States.
Sea Venture	United Kingdom	The brig collided with the steamship Fenham (United Kingdom and sank in the North Sea off Whitby, Yorkshire. Her crew were rescued by Fenham. Sea Venture was on a voyage from London to Sunderland, County Durham.
Star of the Seas	United Kingdom	The schooner foundered off the Keroe Islands, County Wexford with the loss of all hands. She was on a voyage from Milford Haven, Pembrokeshire to Waterford.
Templar	United Kingdom	The schooner sprang a leak and foundered in the North Sea off Scarborough Yorkshire. Her crew were rescued. She was on a voyage from Teignmouth, Devon to the River Tyne.

== 17 November ==
List of shipwrecks: 17 November 1869
Ship	State	Description
Active	United Kingdom	The lugger was run into by a brig and sank in the River Thames at Barking, Essex. Her crew were rescued.
Alonzo	United Kingdom	The ship was driven ashore on Heligoland. She was on a voyage from Cuxhaven to Cardiff, Glamorgan. She was consequently condemned.
Celt, and Kinsale	United Kingdom	The steamships collided in the Clyde at Greenock, Renfrewshire and were both severely damaged. Celt was on a voyage from Glasgow, Renfrewshire to Campbeltown, Argyllshire. She was towed in to Greenock. Kinsale was on a voyage from Cork to Glasgow. She completed her voyage.
D. C. Hoskins	United States	The paddle steamer foundered in the Atlantic Ocean with the loss of 24 lives and four people reported missing. Nine survivors were rescued by the schooner Grassmere (United Kingdom). D. C. Hoskins was on a voyage from New York to San Francisco, California.
Glan Conway	United Kingdom	The sloop sprang a leak and foundered 5 nautical miles (9.3 km) north west of Great Orme Head, Caernarfonshire. Her crew were rescued. She was on a voyage from Liverpool, Lancashire to Pwllfanogl, Anglesey.
Gwen Jones	United Kingdom	The ship was driven ashore at the Cliff End Battery, Isle of Wight. She was on a voyage from Rochester, Kent to Dublin. She was refloated the next day.
Hjemlos, and Nero	Norway; United Kingdom	The barque Hjemlos and the steamship Nero collided in the Humber and were both severely damaged. Hjemlos was on a voyage from Richibucto, New Brunswick, Canada to Hull, Yorkshire. She was taken in to Hull in a watelogged condition. Nero subsequently collided with the training ship HMS Southampton (Royal Navy). She was on a voyage from Kronstadt, Russia to Hull.
Mathilde	France	The ship departed from Sherbro Island, Sierra Leone for Liverpool. No further trace, presumed foundered with the loss of all hands.
M. E. Smith	United Kingdom	The steamship was driven ashore at Scarborough, Yorkshire. She was refloated and taken in to Scarborough.
Prince of Wales	United Kingdom	The steamship ran aground in the River Avon at Sea Mills, Gloucestershire. She was on a voyage from Bristol, Gloucestershire to Swansea, Glamorgan. She was refloated the next day and resumed her voyage.
Racer	United States	Racer While on a voyage from Marquette, Michigan, with a load of iron ore, the wooden schooner went aground in Lake Huron southwest of Cheboygan, Michigan, eventually breaking up. Her wreck lies in 11 feet (3.4 m) of water at 45.581667°N 84.14865°W.
Sherburn	United Kingdom	The steamship ran aground at Sunderland, County Durham. She was then run into by the steamship Union Bayonnaise (France) and was severely damaged. She was refloated and put back to Sunderland.

== 18 November ==
List of shipwrecks: 18 November 1869
Ship	State	Description
Christina	(United Kingdom of Great Britain and Ireland) Isle of Man	The ship was wrecked on the Covesea Skerries, off the coast of Moray. Her crew were rescued. She was on a voyage from Charlestown, Cornwall to Lossiemouth, Moray. She sank on 20 November.
Giovanna d'Arco	Italy	The ship foundered in the Adriatic Sea 10 nautical miles (19 km) off Malamocco with the loss of all hands. She was on a voyage from Venice to Queenstown, County Cork, United Kingdom.
Hope	United Kingdom	The ship ran aground on Scroby Sands, Norfolk. She was refloated the next day.
Isola Bella	Sweden	The barque was driven ashore at Nidingen. She was on a voyage from London, United Kingdom to a Swedish port.
Santa Rita	Spain	The ship was driven ashore and wrecked at Laugharne, Carmarthenshire, United Kingdom. Her eight crew were rescued by a lifeboat She was on a voyage from Santander to Swansea, Glamorgan.
Star	United Kingdom	The smack was holed by an anchor at Milford Haven, Pembrokeshire. She was on a voyage from Bridgwater, Somerset to Kingstown, County Dublin.
Templar	United States	The ship was driven ashore near New York. She was on a voyage from New York to San Francisco, California.
Tropic	United Kingdom	The barque collided with the steamship Boston (United Kingdom) and was abandoned by her crew. Tropic was on a voyage from "Aquilas" to Leith, Lothian. She was taken in to Lowestoft, Suffolk the next day in a derelict condition.

== 19 November ==
List of shipwrecks: 19 November 1869
Ship	State	Description
Emilie	Prussia	The barque ran aground on the Cross Sand, in the North Sea off the coast of Norfolk, United Kingdom. She was on a voyage from Newcastle upon Tyne, Northumberland, United Kingdom to Martinique. She was refloated and taken in to Great Yarmouth, Norfolk.
Flandre	United Kingdom	The brigantine was driven onto rocks at Redcar, Yorkshire. She was refloated with the assistance of a tug and resumed her voyage.
Jane	United Kingdom	The ship ran aground at Hayle, Cornwall. She capsized the next day. Jane was on a voyage from Quebec City, Canada to Hayle. She was later righted and found to be severely damaged.
Lake Superior	Canada	The ship ran aground at Boucherville, Quebec. She was on a voyage from Montreal, Quebec to Liverpool, Lancashire, United Kingdom. She was refloated and resumed her voyage.
Medoc	France	The ship ran aground on Sarn Badrig and was abandoned by her seventeen crew, who were rescued by the Barmouth Lifeboat Ellen ( Royal National Lifeboat Institution). She was on a voyage from Havana, Cuba to Liverpool, Lancashire, United Kingdom. She floated off and drifted in a southerly direction and sank off Aberystwyth, Merionethshire.
Retreiver	United Kingdom	The ship ran aground on the Kentish Knock and was severely damaged. She was on a voyage from South Shields, County Durham to Cartagena, Spain. She was refloated and taken in to Margate, Kent in a severely leaky condition.
Tancreide	France	The ship was wrecked near Barcelona, Spain. She was on a voyage from Marseille, Bouches-du-Rhône to Rosario, Argentina.
Westbotten	Sweden	The steamship ran aground and sank near Vaasa, Grand Duchy of Finland. She was on a voyage from Vaasa to Umeå.
William Frothingham	United States	The ship ran aground on the Ower Sand, in the North Sea off the coast of Norfolk. She was refloated and taken in to Great Yarmouth, Norfolk.

== 20 November ==
List of shipwrecks: 20 November 1869
Ship	State	Description
Airdrie	United Kingdom	The schooner foundered off Culzean Castle, Ayrshire. Her crew were rescued. She was on a voyage from Ayr to Carrickfergus, County Antrim.
Elizabeth and Cicely	United Kingdom	The ship ran aground on the Tongue Sand. She was on a voyage from Guernsey, Channel Islands to London. She was refloated and assisted in to Ramsgate, Kent.
Frina	Norway	The ship put in to Fraserburgh, Aberdeenshire, United Kingdom and sank.
Kenilworth	United Kingdom	The ship was driven ashore at Gurnard, Isle of Wight. She was on a voyage from Hartlepool, County Durham to Galle, Ceylon. She was refloated on 23 November.
Latif	(Ottoman Empire) Egypt	The steamship ran aground in the Suez Canal. She was refloated on 22 November.
Niord	United Kingdom	The brig was wrecked on Arranmore, County Donegal. She was on a voyage from Halifax, Nova Scotia, Canada to Glasgow, Renfrewshire.

== 21 November ==
List of shipwrecks: 21 November 1869
Ship	State	Description
Ravensworth	United Kingdom	The ship was abandoned at sea with the loss of two of her crew. Survivors took to a boat; they were rescued on 24 November by Mikado (United Kingdom). Ravensworth was on a voyage from Bangkok, Siam to Falmouth, Cornwall.
Retreiver	United Kingdom	The ship foundered. She was on a voyage from Huelva, Spain to Swansea, Glamorgan.
Spindrift	United Kingdom	Spindrift The clipper was wrecked east of Dungeness, Kent. All on board survived. She was on a voyage from London to China.

== 22 November ==
List of shipwrecks: 22 November 1869
Ship	State	Description
Anna Krell	Wismar	The ship ran aground on Fehmarn, Prussia and sank. She was on a voyage from Leith, Lothian, United Kingdom to Wismar. She had been refloated by 30 November and sailed for Wismar.
Dashing Spray	United Kingdom	The ship departed from Newport, Monmouthshire for Genoa, Italy. No further trace, presumed foundered with the loss of all hands.
Dordogne	France	The steamship was driven ashore near Havre de Grâce, Seine-Inférieure. She was on a voyage from Rouen, Seine-Inférieure to Bordeaux, Gironde.
Earl of Aberdeen	United Kingdom	The steamship ran aground in the Weser. She was on a voyage from Hamburg to London. She was refloated and resumed her voyage.
Familien	Norway	The schooner was abandoned in the North Sea. She was on a voyage from Brevig to Leith, Lothian, United Kingdom.

== 23 November ==
List of shipwrecks: 23 November 1869
Ship	State	Description
Dawson	United Kingdom	The brig was driven ashore at Redcar, Yorkshire with the loss of two of her eight crew. Survivors were rescued by the Redcar Lifeboat Burton-on-Trent ( Royal National Lifeboat Institution). Dawson was on a voyage from Glückstadt, Prussia to Newcastle upon Tyne, Northumberland. She was refloated and beached.
Elizabeth	United Kingdom	The ship was driven ashore at Weymouth, Dorset. She was on a voyage from Saint-Valery-sur-Somme, Sommer, France to Cardiff, Glamorgan. She was refloated the next day.
Elizabeth Mary Ann	United Kingdom	The schooner struck a sunken rock in the Menai Strait and was holed. She was on a voyage from Garston, Lancashire to Seville, Spain. She put in to Bangor, Caernarfonshire.
Johana	United Kingdom	The schooner sprang a leak and foundered in the North Sea. Her crew were rescued. She was on a voyage from Portmahomack, Ross-shire to Sunderland, County Durham.
Titia Doorenbos	Netherlands	The ship departed from Newcastle upon Tyne, Northumberland, United Kingdom for Groningen. No further trace, presumed foundered with the loss of all hands.

== 24 November ==
List of shipwrecks: 24 November 1869
Ship	State	Description
Atila	Norway	The ship was sighted in the Dardanelles whilst on a voyage from Marianople, Russia to a British port. No further trace, presumed foundered with the loss of all hands.
Cashmere	United Kingdom	The ship foundered in the Atlantic Ocean 350 nautical miles (650 km) west south west of The Lizard, Cornwall. Her crew were rescued by Sunbeam (United Kingdom). Cashmere was on a voyage from the Clyde to New Orleans, Louisiana, United States.
Planet	United Kingdom	The schooner collided with the steamship Douglas ( (United Kingdom of Great Britain and Ireland) Isle of Man and sank in the Sloyne. Her crew were rescued. She was on a voyage from Ardrossan, Ayrshire to Preston, Lancashire.
Prince of Wales	United Kingdom	The ship sprang a leak and was beached on the Isle of Wight. She was on a voyage from London to Dublin.

== 25 November ==
List of shipwrecks: 25 November 1869
Ship	State	Description
Archimedes	United Kingdom	The brigantine collided with the steamship Louisa Ann Fanny (United Kingdom) and sank in the River Thames.
Elizabeth	United Kingdom	The ship was driven ashore in the Sound of Mull. She was on a voyage from Bangor to Kirkwall, Orkney Islands.
Eliza Walker	United Kingdom	The ship sank in the Alvarado. She was on a voyage from Tlacotalpan to Liverpool, Lancashire.
Fenna Johanna	Flag unknown	The schooner was driven ashore at Tönning, Prussia. She was on a voyage from Ystad, Sweden to Tönning and Ipswich, Suffolk, United Kingdom. She was later refloated and taken in to Tönning.
Francika M.	Austria-Hungary	The ship was driven ashore and wrecked at Ravenglass, Cumberland, United Kingdom. Her crew survived. She was on a voyage from Trieste to Silloth, Cumberland.
Marie Gabrielle	United Kingdom	The barque was wrecked near Cape Otway, Victoria. Her crew survived. She was on a voyage from Foo Chow Foo, China to Melbourne, Victoria.
Mary	United Kingdom	The brig ran aground on the Blacktail Spit, in the Thames Estuary.
Rapid	United Kingdom	The ship was driven ashore. She was on a voyage from Morecambe, Lancashire to Newry, County Antrim. She was refloated and taken in to Dromore, County Down.
Staatsrad Hegermann	Denmark	The ship was sighted off the Isle of Lewis, Outer Hebrides, United Kingdom whilst on a voyage from Liverpool to Iceland. No further trace, presumed foundered with the loss of all hands.
Volant	United Kingdom	The ship departed from Enos, Ottoman Empire for Falmouth, Cornwall. No further trace, presumed foundered with the loss of all hands.

== 26 November ==
List of shipwrecks: 26 November 1869
Ship	State	Description
Archimedes	Malta	The brig collided with the steamship Louisa and Fanny (United Kingdom) and sank in the River Thames.
Louth, or Lowther	United Kingdom	The ship sank at Penarth, Glamorgan.
Resolutionen	Denmark	The ship was driven ashore and wrecked on Skagen. She was on a voyage from Newcastle upon Tyne, Northumberland, United Kingdom to Aalborg.
Rose	United Kingdom	The steamship collided with the steamship Cambria (United States) in the Firth of Forth and was severely damaged. Three passengers and five crew got on board Cambria. Sinking at the bow, Rose was beached on Pladda. The rest of her passengers were taken off by two tugs. She was on a voyage from Greenock, Renfrewshire to Londonderry. She was refloated the next day and taken in to Lamlash, Isle of Arran.
Staadsraad Hegermann	Norway	The schooner was sighted off the Isle of Lewis, Outer Hebrides, United Kingdom whilst on a voyage from Liverpool, Lancashire, United Kingdom to Iceland. No further trace, presumed foundered with the loss of all hands.

== 27 November ==
List of shipwrecks: 27 November 1869
Ship	State	Description
Bikuben	Norway	The brig collided with another vessed and ran onto the Goodwin Sands, Kent, United Kingdom. She floated off but foundered off the Gulls Sandbank. Her crew survived. She was on a voyage from Poole, Dorset, United Kingdom to Grimstad.
Frances	United Kingdom	The ship collided with the quayside at Shoreham-by-Sea, Sussex and was severely damaged. She was on a voyage from Harlingen, Friesland, Netherlands to Penarth, Glamorgan.
Jupiter	(United Kingdom of Great Britain and Ireland) Guernsey	The smack was run down and sunk in the English Channel off the South Foreland, Kent. Her crew survived. She was on a voyage from Montrose, Forfarshire to Plymouth, Devon.
Welcome Home	United Kingdom	The schooner was driven ashore at Lymington, Hampshire.

== 28 November ==
List of shipwrecks: 28 November 1869
Ship	State	Description
Dromo	United Kingdom	The ship collided with the schooner British Queen (United Kingdom) and sank off the Brake Sand with the loss of three of her crew. She was on a voyage from Caen, Calvados, France to Sunderland, County Durham British Queen also lost a crew member.
Emmanuel	United Kingdom	The ship was driven ashore at Hornmersiel, Prussia.
George	Russia	The schooner caught fire and was abandoned in the English Channel6 nautical miles (11 km) off Portland, Dorset, United Kingdom. Her crew were rescued by the brig Swift (United Kingdom). George was on a voyage from St. Ubes, Portugal to Riga.
Jupiter	(United Kingdom of Great Britain and Ireland) Jersey	The smack collided with the schooner Juan (United Kingdom) and foundered off Deal, Kent. Her crew were rescued by Juan. Jupiter was on a voyage from Montrose, Forfarshire to Plymouth, Devon.
Luna	Hamburg	The ship was driven ashore near Calais, France. She was on a voyage from Hamburg to Cádiz, Spain.
Noel	France	The ship barque was wrecked 86 nautical miles (159 km) from Suez, Egypt. She was on a voyage from Marseille, Bouches-du-Rhône to Bombay, India.
Schiedam	Netherlands	The ship ran aground on the Hinder Bank. She was on a voyage from Schiedam, South Holland to London, United Kingdom. She was refloated and put back to Schiedam for repairs.
Syracuse	United Kingdom	The ship foundered in the Mediterranean Sea 60 nautical miles (110 km) west of Sardinia, Italy. Her crew were rescued by Doris (Norway). Syracuse was on a voyage from Taganrog, Russia to a British port.
Tickler	(United Kingdom of Great Britain and Ireland) Jersey	The schooner was driven ashore at Grainthorpe, Lincolnshire. Her crew survived. She was on a voyage from Taranto, Italy to Hull, Yorkshire.
Unnamed	United Kingdom	The collier, a brig, sank off Deal, Kent.

== 29 November ==
List of shipwrecks: 29 November 1869
Ship	State	Description
Brothers	United Kingdom	The ship was driven ashore at Porthcawl, Glamorgan. She was on a voyage from Ayr to Marseille, Bouches-du-Rhône, France.
Countess of Bective	United Kingdom	The barque ran aground on the Hinder Sand, off the Dutch coast. Her crew were rescued. She was on a voyage from Rotterdam, South Holland, Netherlands to Sunderland, County Durham.
Dromio	United Kingdom	The ship collided with the schooner British Queen (United Kingdom) and sank off Ramsgate, Kent with the loss of three of her crew. She was on a voyage from Sunderland to Rouen, Seine-Inférieure, France. British Queen also lost a crew member.
Eva	United Kingdom	The barque departed from Havana, Cuba for New Orleans, Louisiana, United States. Presumed foundered with the loss of all hands. A lifebelt from the ship washed up at Matanzas, Cuba.
Hind	United Kingdom	The ship collided with the Prince's Landing Stage, Liverpool, Lancashire and was abandoned by her crew. She was on a voyage from Africa to Liverpool. She was towed to Egremont, Lancashire by the tug United Kingdom (United Kingdom and was beached. She capsized the next day.
Kestrel, and Oceana and Antonia	United Kingdom; Italy)	The barque Oceana and Antonia collided with the steamship Kestrel off Happisburgh, Norfolk, United Kingdom. She was taken in tow for Lowestoft, Suffolk, United Kingdom by a tug but was consequently beached at Great Yarmouth, Norfolk. Oceana and Antonia was on a voyage from Newcastle upon Tyne, Northumberland, United Kingdom to Genoa. Kestrel was severely damaged, with a large hole in her side above the waterline. She was on a voyage from Rotterdam, South Holland, Netherlands to Hull, Yorkshire. She put in to Great Yarmouth for temporary repairs and completed her voyage on 30 November.
National Eagle	United States	The ship was driven onto the Devil's Bank, in Liverpool Bay. She was refloated and taken in to Liverpool.

== 30 November ==
List of shipwrecks: 30 November 1869
Ship	State	Description
A. T. Stewart	United States	The pilot boat collided with RMS Scotia (United Kingdom) and sank off New York. Her crew survived.
Emerald Isle	United Kingdom	The steamship ran aground at Warrenpoint, County Antrim She was on a voyage from Liverpool, Lancashire to Newry, County Antrim. She was refloated and completed her voyage.
Havering	United Kingdom	The ship was destroyed by fire at sea. There were survivors. She was on a voyage from Greenock, Renfrewshire to Bombay, India.
Lainetar	(Russian Empire) Grand Duchy of Finland	The schooner was abandoned in a waterlogged condition off Dungeness, Kent, United Kingdom. Her crew were rescued by the smack New Fashion (United Kingdom). Lainetar was on a voyage from Wasa, to Marseille, Bouches-du-Rhône, France. She was subsequently towed in to Dover, Kent.
Lorenzo	Austria-Hungary	The brig, was wrecked off Cape Finisterre, Spain. She was on a voyage from Odesa, Russia to Falmouth, Cornwall, United Kingdom.
Lubinka	Prussia	The ship ran aground on the Hinder Sand, off the Dutch coast. Her crew were rescued by a tug. She was on a voyage from Flensburg to an English port.
Nymph	United Kingdom	The ship was driven ashore at the Orford Low Light, Suffolk. Her crew were rescued. She was on a voyage from Newcastle upon Tyne, Northumberland to London.
Squirrel	United Kingdom	The schooner was wrecked on the Herd Sand, in the North Sea off the coast of County Durham. Her crew were rescued by the South Shields Lifeboat. She was on a voyage from Leith, Lothian to Port Mulgrave, Yorkshire.
Triumfo	Belgium	The ship was wrecked near "Caraburna".

== Unknown date ==
List of shipwrecks: Unknown date in November 1869
Ship	State	Description
Aaron Eaton	United Kingdom	The ship ran aground. She was refloated and put in to Helsingør, Denmark.
Advance	United Kingdom	The ship was driven ashore on Barnsby's Island. She was on a voyage from Quebec City, Canada to the Clyde. She was refloated on 6 November and resumed her voyage.
America	Flag unknown	The steamship ran aground at the entrance to the Suez Canal. She was on a voyage from Suez, Egypt to Trieste. She was refloated and resumed her voyage.
Anna	United States	The ship was driven ashore at Danzig with the loss of all hands.
Annie	United Kingdom	The brig was driven ashore at Cascumpec, Prince Edward Island, Canada.
Artemis	United Kingdom	The ship was wrecked on the Crimean coast of Russia.
Astoria	United States	The ship was wrecked in Barclay Sound.
Baltimore	United States	The ship was destroyed by fire off the coast of Japan. She was on a voyage from Hong Kong to Yokohama, Japan.
Beatear	United States	The ship was driven ashore in Little Egg Harbor. She was on a voyage from Jamaica to New York.
Bella Rosa	United Kingdom	The ship was lost north east of Formosa. She was on a voyage from Foochow, China to Melbourne, Victoria.
Black Cat	United Kingdom	The ship foundered in the Atlantic Ocean 100 nautical miles (190 km) north east of Cape St. Vincent, Portugal between 12 and 16 November. Her crew were rescued by the brig Fortune (United Kingdom). Black Cat was on a voyage from Huelva, Spain to Liverpool, Lancashire.
Bravour	Flag unknown	The ship was lost near Punto Ribio, Uruguay before 14 November.
Canterbury	United Kingdom	The ship was discovered derelict by A. W. Singleton (United Kingdom), which put a skeleton crew on board. She was taken in to Sydney, Nova Scotia, Canada, where she arrived on 3 November. She had been on a voyage from Quebec City to London.
Citadel	United Kingdom	The ship caught fire off Christiania, Norway and was scuttled. She was on a voyage from Kronstadt, Russia to the Amoor River.
City Arch	United Kingdom	The ship was wrecked at Summerside, Prince Edward Island, Canada.
Devonport	United Kingdom	The ship foundered in the South China Sea before 5 November. Her crew were rescued. She was on a voyage from London to Shanghai, China.
Dolphin	United Kingdom	The ship sank in the North Sea. Her crew were rescued.
Douglas, and Planet	United Kingdom	The schooner Planet collided with the steamship Douglas and sank in the Sloyne. She was on a voyage from Ardrossan, Ayrshire to Preston, Lancashire. Douglas was severely damaged.
Dr. Juritz Jeusen	Flag unknown	The ship was driven ashore on Egg Island. She was on a voyage from Antwerp, Belgium to Montreal, Canada.
Eleanor Thompson	United Kingdom	The brig was abandoned in the Atlantic Ocean. She was on a voyage from Liverpool to Baltimore, Maryland, United States.
Embla	Norway	The ship was abandoned in the North Sea. Her crew were rescued. She was on a voyage from Drammen to Aberdeen, United Kingdom.
Florence Lee	United Kingdom	The ship foundered. She was on a voyage from Montreal to Liverpool.
G. Titus	Flag unknown	The brigantine was driven ashore at Dénia, Spain.
Heinrich	Flag unknown	The ship ran aground in Lake Patos. She was on a voyage from the Rio Grande to Porto Alegre, Brazil. She was refloated and resumed her voyage, but ran aground near Porto Alegre.
Hull Packet	United Kingdom	The ship ran aground on the Caloot Bank, in the Zuyder Zee.
Icon	(United Kingdom of Great Britain and Ireland) Victoria	The ship was wrecked on Rarotonga. Her crew were rescued. She was on a voyage from Melbourne to Malden Island.
Inarine	United Kingdom	The ship was wrecked in the South China Sea. She was on a voyage from Foochow, China to London.
Jacob Arendt	Flag Unknown	The ship was driven ashore in the Sea of Marmara. She was on a voyage from Malta to Constantinople. She was refloated.
Jubilee	(United Kingdom of Great Britain and Ireland) Jersey	The ship was abandoned at sea. Her crew were rescued by the brig Juan (Spain).
Kate Cleater	Canada	The ship was abandoned at sea. Her crew were rescued by Architect (United Kingdom).
Lady Agnes	United Kingdom	The ship was driven ashore on Goose Island. She was on a voyage from Montreal to a British port. She had been refloated by 27 November and towed back to Montreal.
Leading Star	United Kingdom	The ship was driven ashore at Constantinople, Ottoman Empire. She was on a voyage from Berdyansk, Russia to Falmouth, Cornwall. She was refloated and resumed her voyage.
Lloyds	United Kingdom	The steamship ran aground in the Danube before 18 November.
Lochleven's Flower	United Kingdom	The ship ran aground off Cape Helles, Ottoman Empire. She was on a voyage from Alexandria, Egypt to Constantinople. She was refloated with assistance.
Luigi	Italy	The ship was driven ashore east of Cape Palos, Spain. She was on a voyage from Newcastle upon Tyne, Northumberland, United Kingdom to Palermo, Sicily.
Mary J. Smith	United States	The ship was wrecked in Barclay Sound.
Mary Nicholson	United Kingdom	The ship was abandoned in the Pacific Ocean with the loss of a crew member. She was on a voyage from Liverpool to Hong Kong.
Mary Russell Mitford	United Kingdom	The ship ran aground at Cap Arcona, Prussia. She was on a voyage from Stettin to London. She was refloated and taken in to Helsingør, Denmark, where she arrived on 23 November in a leaky condition.
Mistress of the Seas	United Kingdom	The ship was destroyed by fire off the Cape of Good Hope, Cape Colony. She was on a voyage from Bombay, India to Havre de Grâce, Seine-Inférieure, France.
Onward	United Kingdom	The fishing lugger was run into by the lugger 199 (United Kingdom) and sank off Lowestoft, Suffolk. Her crew survived.
Orientes	United Kingdom	The ship was wrecked near Chioggia, Italy.
Parthenon	Flag unknown	The steamship ran aground off Dénia. She subsequently broke in two.
Regina	United Kingdom	The ship was driven ashore at Cape Henry, Virginia, United States before 9 November. She was on a voyage from Baltimore to Liverpool. She had been refloated by 15 November and put back to Baltimore.
Richard Reynolds	United Kingdom	The derelict ship was driven ashore near Riga, Russia.
Rieka	Netherlands	The ship foundered. Her crew were rescued. She was on a voyage from Havana, Cuba to Falmouth.
Solid	United Kingdom	The ship was abandoned in the North Sea. Her crew were rescued. She was on a voyage from Sunderland, County Durham to Aberdeen.
Susan	United Kingdom	The ship ran aground in the Dardanelles. She was on a voyage from Liverpool to Constantinople. She had been refloated by 15 November.
Velocipede	United Kingdom	The ship ran aground in Lake St. Peter. She was on a voyage from Montreal to London. She was refloated and resumed her voyage.
Volunteer	(United Kingdom of Great Britain and Ireland) Cape Colony	The ship was wrecked. She was on a voyage from Hondeklip Bay to Table Bay.
Wagno	United Kingdom	The ship was destroyed by fire at sea. She was on a voyage from South Shields to Alexandria, Egypt.
Zeepard	Netherlands	The ship foundered in the North Sea.
