= Afon Braint (tugboat) =

History
- Name: Afon Braint
- Owner: Holyhead Towing Company Ltd
- Builder: Hepworth Shipyard Ltd, Paull, Yorkshire
- Completed: 2005
- Acquired: April 2005
- Identification: IMO number: 9321067; MMSI number: 235025334; Callsign: MHMH2

General characteristics
- Type: Tugboat
- Length: 25.5 metres (84 ft)
- Beam: 9 metres (30 ft)
- Draft: 2.4 metres (7.9 ft)
- Depth: 3.6 metres (12 ft)
- Installed power: 2 x Cummins powered 50kVA generator sets
- Propulsion: 2 x Cummins KTA 38M2 engines; 1x Kort KT-150 bow thruster
- Speed: 11.2 knots
- Crew: 12 crew members

Afon Braint is a tugboat in service for the Holyhead Towing Company Ltd, named for the river Afon Braint.

== Design ==
Afon Braint was built at Hepworth Shipyard Ltd in Paull, Yorkshire, the fourth such vessel built by the yard. She is the sister vessel to the earlier Afon Alaw, both of which were on the smaller Hepworth built Afon Cefni. She was delivered to the Holyhead Towing Company Ltd in April 2005. She measures 25.5 metres (84 ft) long overall and has a beam of 9 metres (30 ft) and a working draft of 2.4 metres (7.9 ft). Afon Braint is equipped with two Cummins KTA 38M2 engines and a Kort KT-150 bow thruster. She is powered by two Cummins powered 50kVA generator sets. She can reach a speed of 11.2 knots. The superstructure, wheelhouse and on-board accommodation is nearly identical to Afon Alaw. She was named for the river in the south east area of the island of Holyhead, North Wales.
