= Afon Braint =

Small tidal river on Anglesey, North Wales

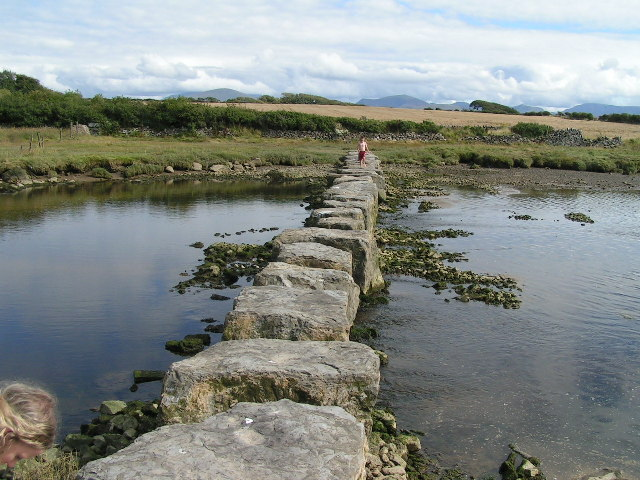
- The stepping stones across Afon Braint

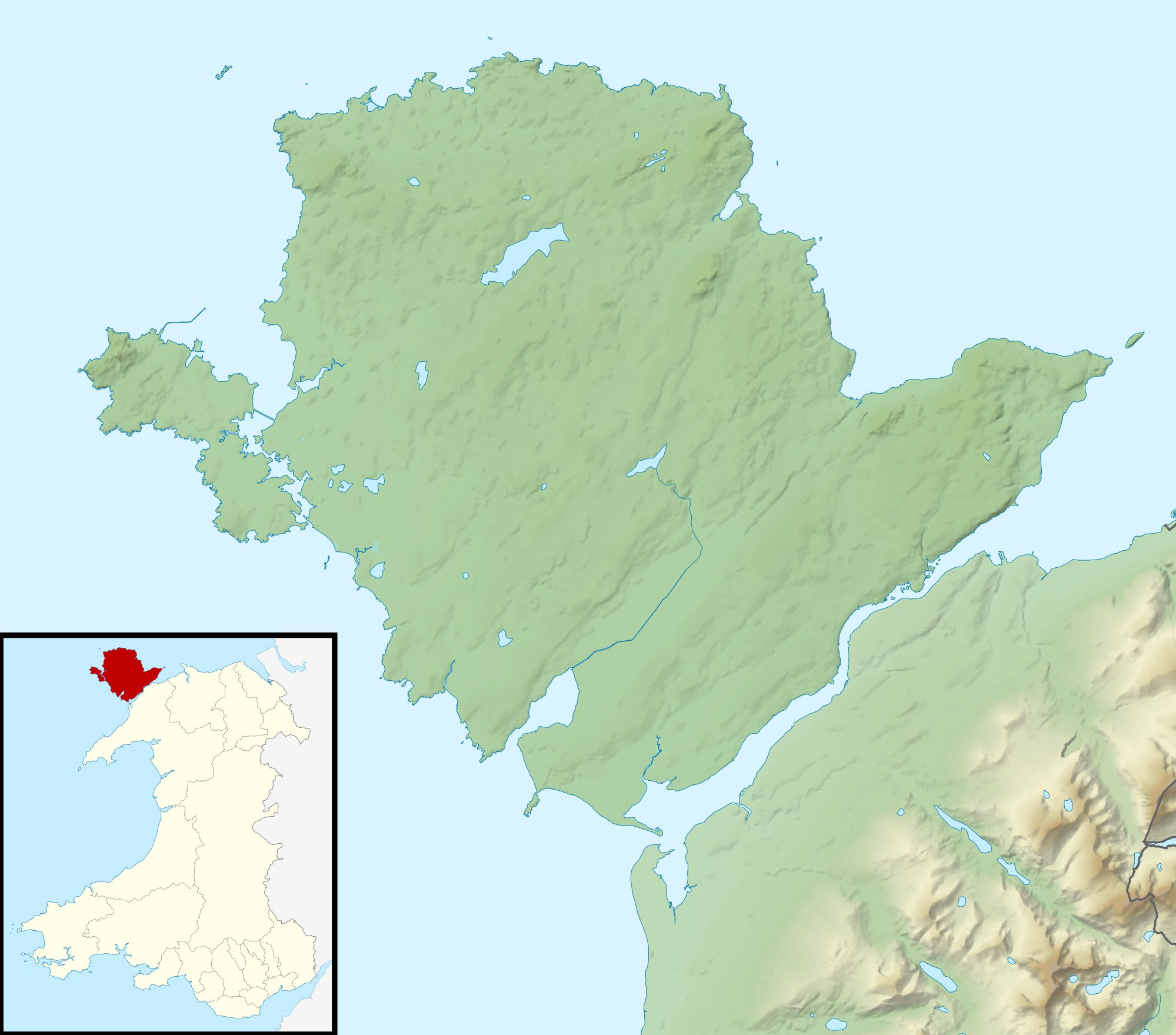
- Location of the mouth

Location
- Country: Wales

Physical characteristics
- Source: Pentraeth
  - coordinates: 53°17′4″N 4°9′57″W
- Mouth: Menai Strait
  - coordinates: 53°8′52″N 4°20′18″W

Afon Braint (English: River Braint) is a small tidal river on Anglesey, North Wales. There is a series of stepping stones near the village of Dwyran, and a Grade II bridge near Penmynydd. Until recently, there was an electoral ward named after the river.

== Description ==
Afon Braint is a river in the south of the island of Anglesey, North Wales. Its primary source is Llyn Llwydiarth, (coordinates: 53.283884, -4.178133), a lake on Mynydd Llwydiarth, within the Pentraeth Forest, east of Pentraeth, and south-west of Llanddona.

This river is unusual, in so far as it has two widely separated mouths, both on the Menai Strait on the south coast of the island. The river splits near Llanfairpwllgwyngyll (at coordinates: 53.219124, -4.228168), where one branch flows briefly eastwards, then south into the Menai Strait at Pwllfanogl (at coordinates: 53.215660, -4.202717).

The other main branch of Afon Braint flows south westward from Llanfairpwllgwyngyll, towards Brynsiencyn, parallel and to the north of the A4080 road until Dwyran, where it turns south-west, passing beneath the road, flowing into the Menai Strait at Traeth Abermenai, east of Newborough Warren, near Pen-Lôn. At this terminus, Afon Braint is a tidal river (coordinates: 53.147763, -4.336195).

In modern Welsh, the word 'braint' means, 'privilege, prerogative, birthright; honour, dignity, blessing; status, position, rank, value, state; right, freedom, liberty', however the river name is thought to derive from Brigantia, a goddess in Celtic (Romano-British and Gallo-Roman) religion of Late Antiquity.

The prehistoric Bryn Celli Ddu, considered to be one of Wales's finest passage graves, is located 200 metres (660 ft) from the river. Near to the village of Dwyran, there is a series of large limestone stepping stones across the river. There is a Grade II listed bridge in close proximity to Penmynydd.

In 2004, the river flooded causing disruption to the train services on the Holyhead to Chester line at the Llanfairpwllgwyngyll crossing. A tugboat has been named after the river; the Afon Braint was delivered to the Holyhead Towing Company in April 2005.
