= Bryn Gwyn stones =

Set of stones in Anglesey, Wales

Bryn Gwyn Stones
- Cerrig Bryn Gwyn
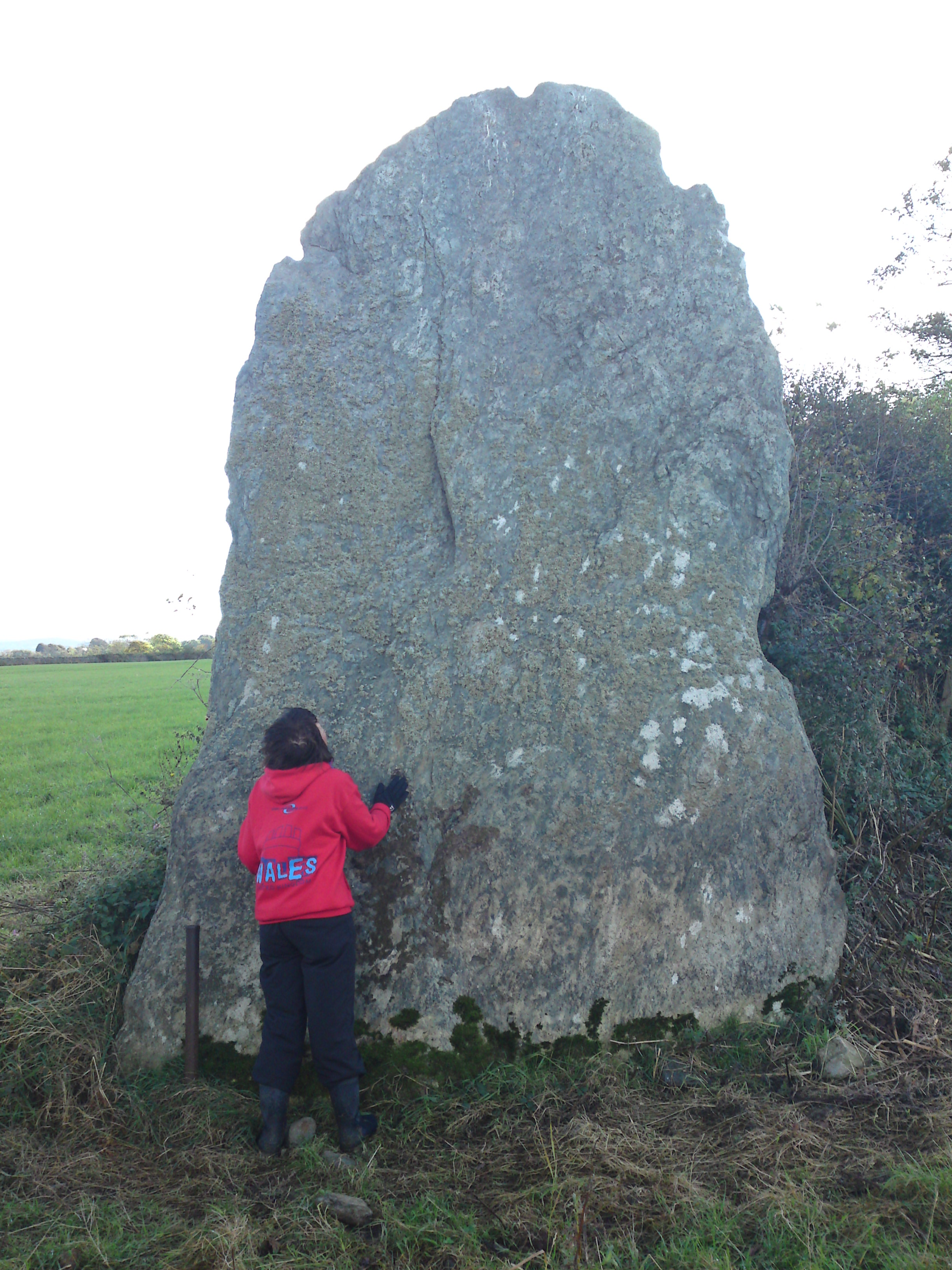
- Bryn Gwyn slab stone

- Location within Anglesey
- 53.177174°N 4.302127°W
- Type: Stone circle
- Periods: Neolithic
- Location: Brynsiencyn, Anglesey, Wales
- Region: Great Britain

Site notes
- Material: stone
- Height: 4 m (13 ft)
- Excavation dates: 2010
- Archaeologists: Gwynedd Archaeological Trust
- Public access: Yes

Scheduled monument
- Reference no.: AN022

The Bryn Gwyn Stones (Welsh: Cerrig Bryn Gwyn) or Bryn Gwyn Standing Stones are neolithic stones in Brynsiencyn on Anglesey.

== Description and History ==
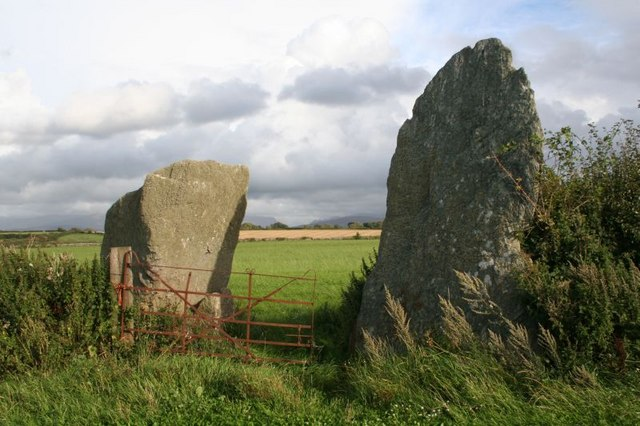
Bryn Gwyn stones in use as a gatepost

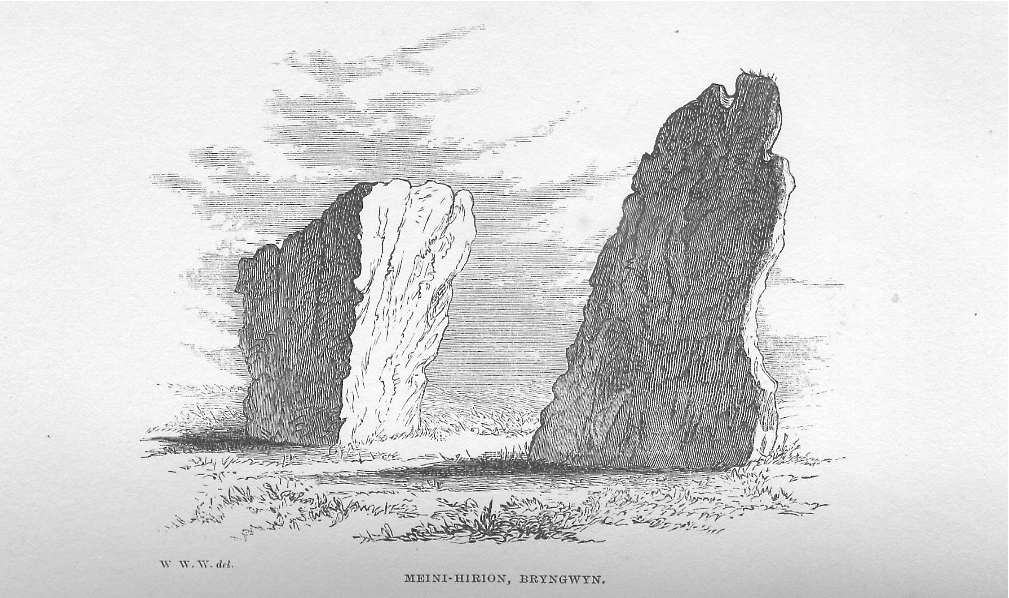
Bryn Gwyn stones drawn in 1871 by W Wynn Williams

The Bryn Gwyn stones stand about 280 metres (920 ft) to the south-west of Castell Bryn Gwyn, on the low ridge some 2 m (7 ft) above the valley of the Afon Braint on the Isle of Anglesey in Wales.

They are the tallest standing stones in Wales, nearly 4 m high (13 ft). In 1723 Henry Rowlands described them as part of a ruinous circle of eight stones, some 16 m (52 ft) across. An account of 1797 says that "ignorant country people supposing money was hid under them tore them up" and today only two stones, one slab and one pillar, stand in a modern field bank. Nothing else is visible on the ground, but a 2008 excavation found three pits of standing stones, two containing stone stumps, consistent with the record by Rowlands. Further excavations in 2010 identified the pits of three more removed standing stones, making seven identified in all of the eight expected to make up the original circle.

The pit of a further stone, inside the circle, shows it was a 'blade-style' stone, with an alignment with the summer solstice sunrise and winter solstice sunset. A public footpath runs past the stones from Bryngwyn-mawr on the A4080 road, continuing north-east on a low ridge past Castell Bryn Gwyn and some 800 metres further to Caer Lêb. From the Bryn Gwyn Stones the midsummer sun rises over the centre of Castell Bryn Gwyn.

In the 18th century a cottage was built with the wide stone as its end wall. Notches round its top show where roof timbers had been fitted. With the removal of the cottage (which had occupied an area inside the stone circle) the stones were used as a gateway through the field hedge.

Further to the north-east at Tre'r Dryw Bach, another large stone circle was reported by 18th century visitors but has since been cleared away.

== See also ==
- List of Scheduled Monuments in Anglesey
- List of stone circles
- Castell Bryn Gwyn
- Archaeology of Wales
