= Pen-Lôn =

Coordinates: 53.158732°N 4.349209°W

- Location within Anglesey
- OS grid reference: SH 4303 6498
- Community: Rhosyr
- Principal area: Anglesey
- Country: Wales
- Sovereign state: United Kingdom
- Post town: Llanfair Pwllgwyngyll
- Dialling code: 01407
- Police: North Wales
- Fire: North Wales
- Ambulance: Welsh
- UK Parliament: Ynys Môn
- Senedd Cymru – Welsh Parliament: Ynys Môn

Pen-Lon is a village in the community of Rhosyr, Anglesey, Wales, located just south east of the larger village of Newborough. Attractions in the locality include the island's model village (miniature park).

The nearest railway station is Bodorgan, five miles away and the 42 bus from Llangefni to Bangor runs through the village.

== See also ==
- List of localities in Wales by population
