= Bryngwyn, Ceredigion =

Village in Ceredigion, Wales

Coordinates: 52°04′34″N 4°28′54″W

Bryngwyn
- Location within Ceredigion
- OS grid reference: SN 3002 4487
  - Cardiff: 69.3 mi (111.5 km)
  - London: 190.1 mi (305.9 km)
- Community: Beulah
- Principal area: Ceredigion
- Country: Wales
- Sovereign state: United Kingdom
- Post town: Newcastle Emlyn
- Postcode district: SA38
- Police: Dyfed-Powys
- Fire: Mid and West Wales
- Ambulance: Welsh
- UK Parliament: Ceredigion Preseli
- Senedd Cymru – Welsh Parliament: Ceredigion Penfro

Bryngwyn (Welsh for 'white hill') is a small village in the community of Beulah, Ceredigion, Wales. Bryngwyn is represented in the Senedd by Elin Jones (Plaid Cymru) and is part of the Ceredigion Preseli constituency in the House of Commons.
