= Castell Bryn Gwyn =

Welsh prehistoric site

- Castell Bryngwyn; Castell Bryngwyn Prehistoric Enclosure
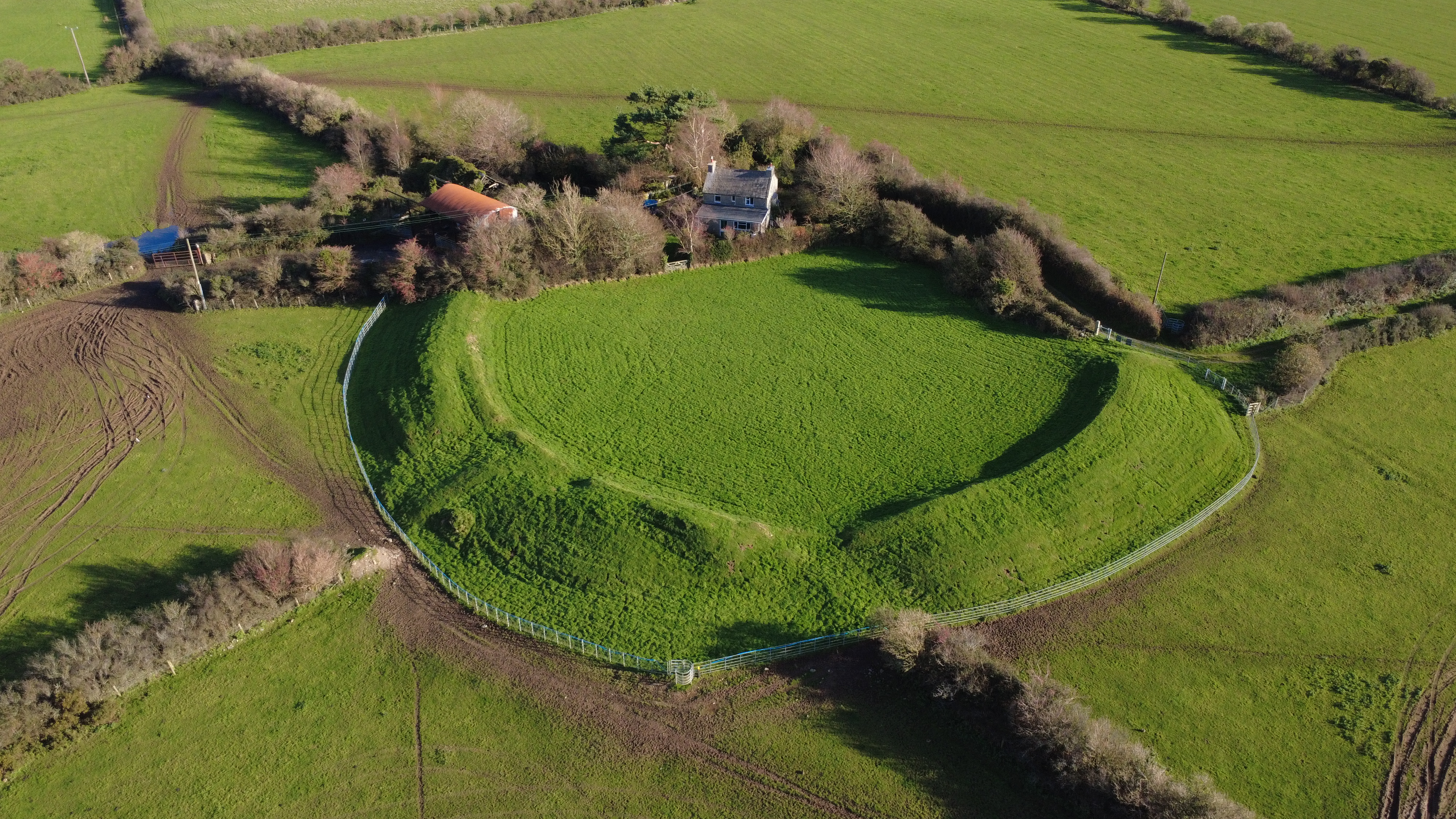
- Oblique view of Castell Bryn Gwyn
- Interactive map of Castell Bryn Gwyn
- 53.1784°N 4.2978°W
- Type: enclosure
- Periods: Neolithic, Iron Age, Roman
- Location: Anglesey, Wales

History
- Built: end Neolithic

Site notes
- Material: clay, gravel, dry stone
- Height: 1.5 m (4 ft 11 in)
- Width: 64 m (210 ft)
- Management: Cadw
- Public access: Yes
- Website: Castell Bryngwyn Prehistoric Enclosure (Cadw)

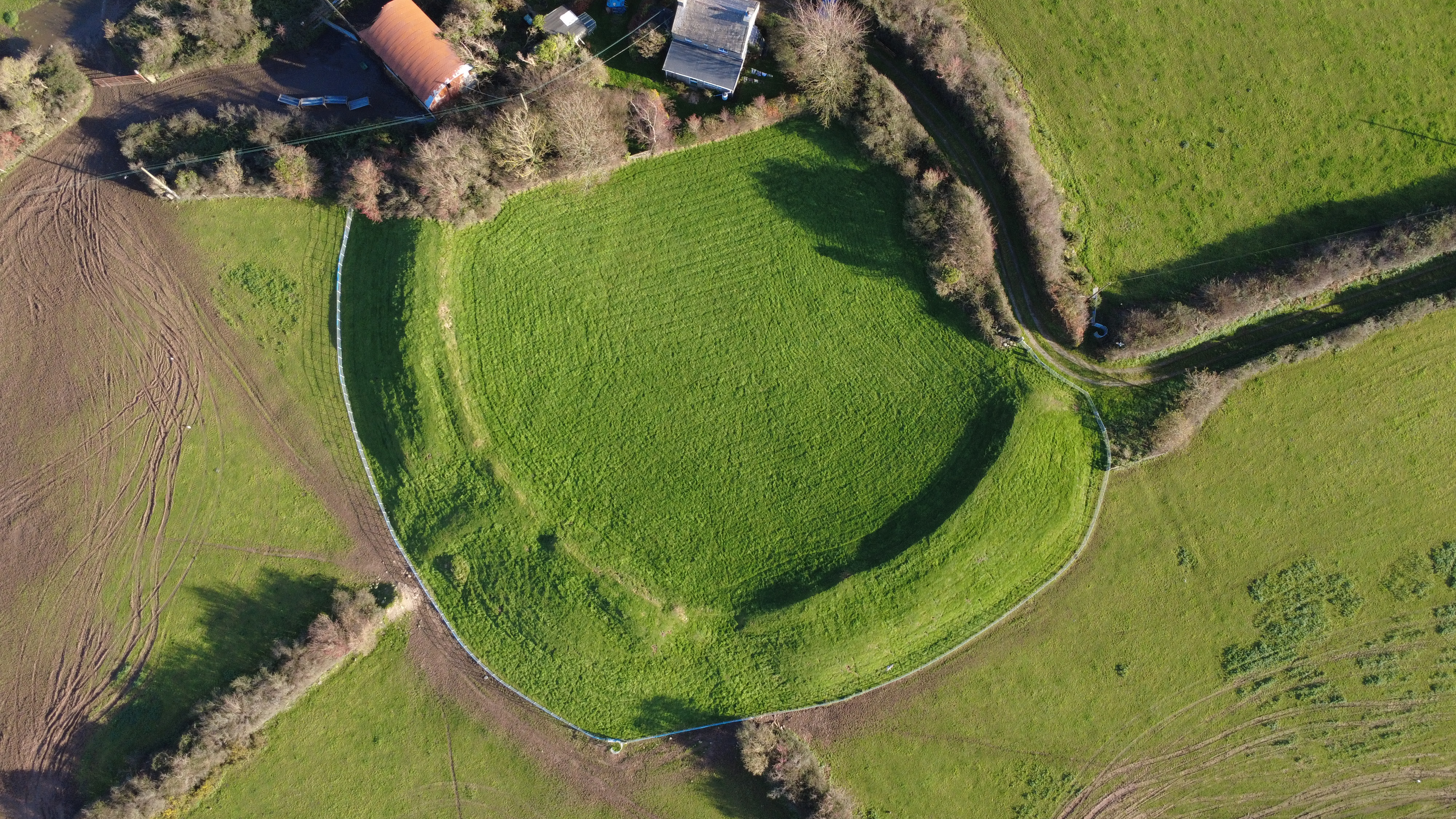
Vertical view of Castell Bryngwyn

Castell Bryn Gwyn, officially spelled Castell Bryngwyn, is a prehistoric site on the Isle of Anglesey, west of Brynsiencyn. It is a circular clay and gravel bank covered with grass, still some 1.5 metres (4.9 ft) high and revetted externally by stone walls, which surround a level area some 54 metres (177 ft) in diameter.

Its name means "White Hill Castle". Since 2024, Cadw, who maintain the site, use the spelling "Bryngwyn".

== Prehistoric origins ==
The original use of this site is uncertain although it may have been a religious sanctuary. Later Neolithic pottery indicates use in this period, and it may have been a henge monument at this time. The earliest bank and ditch belong to the end of the Neolithic period (2500-2000 BC).

=== Roman invasion ===
During the Iron Age, the present wall was built, and it was rebuilt in Roman times and later.

== Access ==
Car parking is minimal but the site is accessible from the A4080 by a footpath. Another path follows the low ridge, southwest over stiles to the Bryn Gwyn stones, or northeast, past the site of the former stone circle of Tre'r Dryw Bach, some 1/2 mile (800 metres) to Caer Lêb where it meets a minor road with limited car parking space.

== See also ==
- List of hillforts in Wales
