= Pwllfanogl =

Coordinates: 53.215021°N 4.202885°W

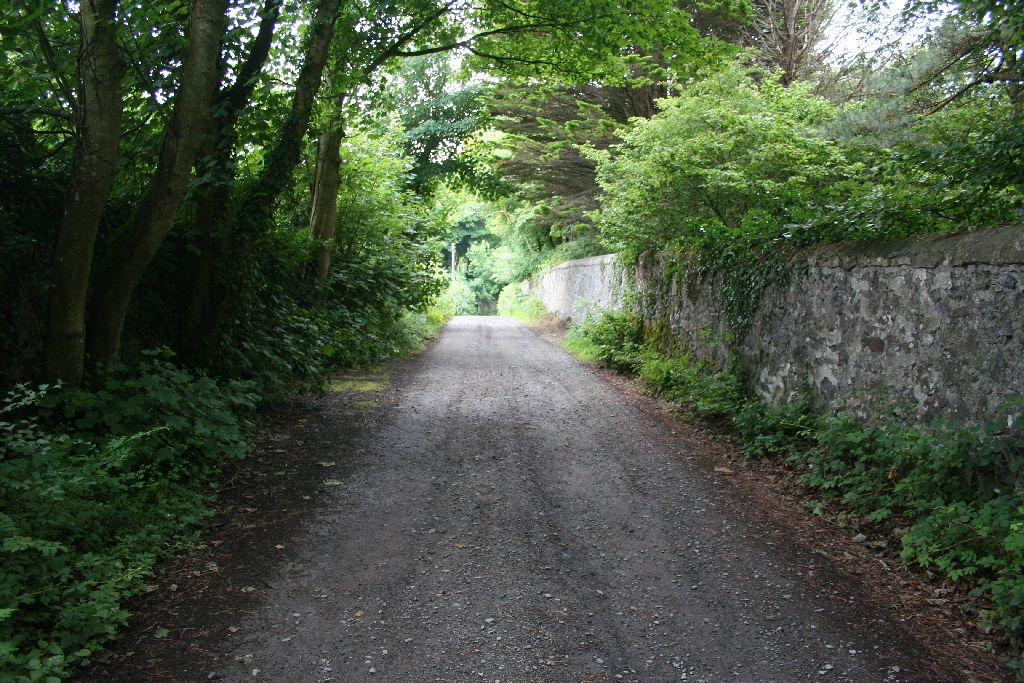

- Location within Anglesey
- OS grid reference: SH 5300 7093
  - Cardiff: 127.4 mi (205.0 km)
  - London: 208.5 mi (335.5 km)
- Community: Llanfair Pwllgwyngyll
- Principal area: Anglesey
- Country: Wales
- Sovereign state: United Kingdom
- Post town: Llanfair Pwllgwyngyll
- Police: North Wales
- Fire: North Wales
- Ambulance: Welsh
- UK Parliament: Ynys Môn
- Senedd Cymru – Welsh Parliament: Ynys Môn

Pwllfanogl is a hamlet in the community of Llanfair Pwllgwyngyll, Anglesey, Wales, which is 127.4 miles (205.1 km) from Cardiff and 208.5 miles (335.5 km) from London.

== See also ==
- List of localities in Wales by population
