= Registered historic parks and gardens in Monmouthshire =

List of buildings in the county of Wales

Monmouthshire shown within Wales

Monmouthshire is a county of Wales. It borders Torfaen and Newport to the west; Herefordshire and Gloucestershire (in England) to the east; and Powys to the north. The largest town is Abergavenny, with other large settlements being Chepstow, Monmouth, and Usk. The present county was formed under the Local Government (Wales) Act 1994, which came into effect in 1996. It has an area of 850 km^{2} (330 sq mi), with a population of 93,200 as of 2021. Monmouthshire comprises some sixty per cent of the historic county, and was known as Gwent between 1974 and 1996. (Note: In his essay on local government in the fifth and final volume of the Gwent County History, Robert McCloy suggests that the governance of "no county in the United Kingdom in the twentieth century was so transformed as that of Monmouthshire".)

The Cadw/ICOMOS Register of Parks and Gardens of Special Historic Interest in Wales was established in 2002 and given statutory status in 2022. Its heightened status reflected an increased recognition of the importance of historic landscapes. Elisabeth Whittle, president of the Welsh Historic Gardens Trust and Cadw's inspector of landscapes, wrote, "historic parks and gardens are an integral part of the Welsh archaeological and architectural heritage." The register is administered by Cadw, the historic environment agency of the Welsh Government. It includes just under 400 sites, covering the gardens and parkland of private houses, historic deer parks, cemeteries, common land and public parks, which are recorded by principal area. Sites are listed at one of three grades, matching the grading system used for listed buildings. Grade I is the highest grade, for landscapes of exceptional interest; Grade II*, the next highest, denotes parks and gardens of more than special interest; while Grade II denotes nationally important sites of special interest. In addition to the Cadw register, a separate record of historic sites, called Coflein, is maintained by the Royal Commission on the Ancient and Historical Monuments of Wales (RCAHMW). (Note: The Cadw/ICOMOS Register uses a single designation for each historic park and/or garden, the reference number in the penultimate column of the list. Individual sites may, however, have multiple historic listing designations. As an example, Abergavenny Castle has the Cadw designation for its garden. It has listed building designations for the castle itself; for the hunting lodge, now the town's museum; for the gate lodge and its gates and wall; and for the castle's outer wall. The castle is also a designated scheduled monument. Lastly, the RCAHMW maintains three records for the site on its National Monuments Record of Wales, Coflein, database: for the garden; for the castle; and for the remains of the town's walls.)

There are 48 registered parks and gardens in Monmouthshire. Five are listed at Grade I, nine at Grade II*, and thirty-four at Grade II. They include two deer parks, three urban parks, a cemetery and, the most common categories, the gardens of private houses and the parklands of country estates. The earliest sites are the mediaeval deer parks, while the 16th and 17th centuries saw the construction of the "outstandingly important" gardens at Raglan Castle. The 18th century brought the county's finest Picturesque landscape at Piercefield House, and the 19th its best Gothic Revival work at Clytha Park. In the 20th century Henry Avray Tipping created four gardens, all of which are Grade II*.

== Key ==
Grade	Criteria
I	Parks and gardens of exceptional interest
II*	Particularly important parks and gardens of more than special interest
II	Parks and gardens of national importance and special interest

== List of parks and gardens ==
List of parks and gardens
Name	Location Grid Ref. (Note: Sometimes known as OSGB36, the grid reference is based on the British national grid reference system used by the Ordnance Survey.) Geo-coordinates	Date Listed	Site type	Description / Notes	Grade	Reference Number	Image
Abergavenny Castle	Abergavenny; SO 29856 14011; 51°49′13″N 3°01′09″W	1 February 2022	Park	The grounds of the mediaeval castle ruins were landscaped c. 1800 with walks created within the curtain walls. In the later nineteenth century further landscaping took place, a formal garden was laid out, and the castle grounds became a public park.	II	PGW(Gt)9(MON)	Abergavenny Castle
Abergavenny Priory Deer Park	Abergavenny; SO 28443 17784; 51°51′15″N 3°02′25″W	1 February 2022	Deer park	The deer park of Abergavenny Priory, dating from the later Middle Ages. Originally some 500 acres in extent, substantial sections of the park boundaries, comprising ditches, earthen banks and walls, survive.	II	PGW(Gt)55(MON)	Abergavenny Priory Deer Park
The Argoed	Penallt; SO 52301 08442; 51°46′21″N 2°41′34″W	1 February 2022	Garden	In the 17th century the estate was owned by the Proberts, prominent local landowners. In the 19th, it was bought by Richard Potter, father of Beatrice Webb, whose friend, George Bernard Shaw was a frequent visitor. The gardens, laid out in typical Victorian style, have views over the River Wye. Elements remain of the earlier garden from the 16th and 17th centuries, including the terraces.	II	PGW(Gt)49(MON)	The Argoed
Bailey Park	Abergavenny; SO 30089 14638; 51°49′33″N 3°00′57″W	1 February 2022	Urban park	Laid out in 1884 on land donated by Crawshay Bailey, Junior, Bailey Park is a good example of a late-Victorian urban park. It contains the site of a lido, built in 1939 and demolished in the early 21st century.	II	PGW(Gt)60(MON)	Bailey Park
Bertholey House	Llantrisant Fawr; ST 39682 94561; 51°38′48″N 2°52′23″W	1 February 2022	Garden	An early 19th century landscape park which formed the grounds to Bertholey House. The house was almost completely destroyed in a fire in 1905 but was rebuilt in the early 21st century. The gardens include pleasure grounds close to the house and a wild garden in the woods beyond.	II	PGW(Gt)11(MON)	Bertholey House
Brynderwen	Llanarth; SO 35504 06952; 51°45′27″N 2°56′09″W	1 February 2022	Park	The landscape park to Brynderwen Court was laid out in the 1820s when the house was built. The gardens are later, dating from the Edwardian era when the house was extended, and include the remains of a rose garden, tennis courts and a tennis pavilion, and a kitchen garden.	II	PGW(Gt)12(MON)	Brynderwen
Cefn Ila	Llanbadoc; SO 36195 00429; 51°41′56″N 2°55′29″W	1 February 2022	Park	The landscape park to Cefn Ila House, which burnt down in 1973. The park is particularly notable for its specimen trees and shrubs, including a Cedar of Lebanon. The estate is now owned by the Woodland Trust.	II	PGW(Gt)63(MON)	Cefn Ila
Cefntilla Court	Llandenny; SO 40480 02967; 51°43′20″N 2°51′47″W	1 February 2022	Garden and park	The gardens and grounds were created, and the present house built, in the 1850s for Richard Somerset, 2nd Baron Raglan, as a memorial to his father, Lord Raglan, British commander in the Crimean War. The park includes two drives leading to the house, with ornamental gardens surrounding it. They date from the time of the house's construction and display planting typical of the Victorian era, including the remains of a substantial collection of rhododendrons.	II	PGW(Gt)31(MON)	Cefntilla Court
Chapel House	Monmouth; SO 50828 13264; 51°48′57″N 2°42′53″W	1 February 2022	Garden	An early 18th century town house garden, with terraces running down to the River Monnow supported by brick revetments. The brick foundations of an orangery remain, although the building is gone. The lowest level terrace, bordering the river, was the site of an orchard. The RCAHMW considers the garden a "rare survival".	II	PGW(Gt)43(MON)	Chapel House
Chepstow Park	Devauden; ST 48209 99050; 51°41′16″N 2°45′02″W	1 February 2022	Deer park	The deer park of Chepstow Castle, the original park, dating from the Middle Ages was enclosed by a fence. In the 17th century, this was replaced with a stone wall. Striguil, the original name for Chepstow Castle, was an important Marcher lordship and the park was created by Roger Bigod, great-grandson of William Marshal, in the late 13th century. Payments to two rangers were recorded in 1283, and it is likely Bigod developed the park in the previous decade.	II	PGW(Gt)61(MON)	Chepstow Park
Chippenham Mead	Monmouth; SO 50689 12523; 51°48′33″N 2°43′00″W	1 February 2022	Urban park / common land	Originally common land in the centre of the town, Chippenham was later developed as an urban park. The paths, lined with limes and sycamores, were laid out in 1909. In the 19th century, the mead was notable for its horse racing events and in the 21st it accommodates sports grounds and a children's playground. It lies next to the River Wye and is protected by flood defences at its northern end.	II	PGW(Gt)6(MON)	Chippenham Mead
Clytha Park	Clytha; SO 36439 09013; 51°46′34″N 2°55′22″W	1 February 2022	Park	John Newman, in his Gwent/Monmouthshire volume of the Pevsner Buildings of Wales, published in 2000, considers Clytha Park is "the finest early nineteenth century Greek Revival house in the county", and that its parkland contains Monmouthshire's "two outstanding examples of late eighteenth century Gothic", the gates to the park and Clytha Castle. The park was laid out in the very late 18th century for William Jones.	I	PGW(Gt)15(MON)	Clytha Park
Coldbrook Park	Llanover; SO 31333 12678; 51°48′31″N 2°59′51″W	1 February 2022	Park	The house at Coldbrook was demolished in 1954 but many of the features of its 18th century landscape park remain. Originally a deer park, it was landscaped in the 18th century by Charles Hanbury Williams who developed four tree-lined avenues radiating from his new house. Further development of the estate took place in the 19th century when the estate was owned by Lady Llanover.	II	PGW(Gt)30(MON)	Coldbrook Park
Dewstow House	Caldicot; ST 48209 99050; 51°35′46″N 2°45′02″W	1 February 2022	Garden	The gardens at Dewstow House were laid out in the first two decades of the 20th century by Henry Oakley. They are most notable for their underground works, a remarkable series of caverns and pools constructed of Pulhamite, an artificial stone. John Newman, in his Gwent/Monmouthshire volume of the Pevsner Buildings of Wales published in 2000, describes the "underground passages and top-light chambers with artificial rock-work and stalactites." Much of the subterranean work was covered over in the later 20th century before being rediscovered and restored in the 21st.	I	PGW(Gt)44(MON)	Dewstow House
Dingestow Court	Dingestow; SO 45064 09715; 51°47′00″N 2°47′52″W	1 February 2022	Park	An important Victorian park and garden designed by Edward Milner. The park was developed in the 18th century and some features from this period survive, such as the ha-ha. In the 19th century the estate was bought by Samuel Bosanquet and the house and estate were further improved and extended by him and by his descendants. In 1883 Milner was engaged to redesign the grounds, which included moving the public road, re-siting the private drives and enlarging the lake.	II*	PGW(Gt)1(MON)	Dingestow Court
Glen Usk	Llanhennock; ST 36249 92734; 51°37′47″N 2°55′21″W	1 February 2022	Garden	The first gardens at Glen Usk were contemporaneous with the 1830s house, built by Sir Digby Mackworth, Bt. The park was further developed in the 1840s. In the 1920s, areas around the tennis court were redeveloped and terraced in an Arts and Crafts style. The house sits on a plateau above the north bank of the River Usk and has wide views over the Usk Valley and the golf course of the Celtic Manor Resort.	II	PGW(Gt)36(MON)	Glen Usk
The Hendre	Llangattock-Vibon-Avel; SO 45868 14128; 51°49′23″N 2°47′13″W	1 February 2022	Park	John Rolls, 1st Baron Llangattock employed Henry Ernest Milner from the 1870s to lay out what Elisabeth Whittle, a garden historian and formerly Cadw's Inspector of Historic Landscapes, described as "the grandest and most important Victorian park and garden in Monmouthshire." The centre of a major estate, the gardens and park boasted drives, rockeries, a lake, cascades, and multiple lodges, including one in the guise of a Swiss Cottage, designed by Sir Aston Webb. The Hendre is now the site of the Rolls of Monmouth Golf Club. (Note: John Newman, the architectural historian, described the Swiss Cottage as "a sweet little thing but not particularly Swiss".)	II*	PGW(Gt)17(MON)	The Hendre
High Glanau	Mitchel Troy; SO 49726 07453; 51°45′49″N 2°43′48″W	1 February 2022	Garden	The last of three important gardens in Monmouthshire designed and developed by Henry Avray Tipping for himself. All are listed at Grade II*. High Glanau, laid out between 1922 and 1929, contained terraces, pools and a pergola. Much of Tipping's planting was destroyed in the 1960s, and a swimming pool was dug out on the top terrace. Restoration has been carried out in the 21st century by Tipping's biographer. (Note: Helena Gerrish, the owner of High Glanau as of 2023, published Edwardian Country Life: The Story of H. Avray Tipping in 2011.)	II*	PGW(Gt)45(MON)	High Glanau
The Hill	Abergavenny; SO 29551 15433; 51°49′59″N 3°01′26″W	1 February 2022	Garden	The gardens and grounds of The Hill were developed in the 19th century as a "mini country estate" to the north of the town. In the 1830s, the property was owned by John Wedgwood, son of Josiah Wedgwood, the potter. John Wedgwood was an enthusiastic plantsman and a founder member of the Royal Horticultural Society. His gardening diaries, held at the Lindley Library, cover his time at The Hill. Much of the garden has been lost to residential development in the 21st century.	II	PGW(Gt)62(MON)	The Hill
Hilston Park	Newcastle; SO 44575 18784; 51°51′54″N 2°48′23″W	1 February 2022	Park	A 19th century landscape park with a lake and a folly, the estate was developed by the Cave family, who bought it after the original house was damaged by fire in the 1830s. The Caves rebuilt the house, laid out a new park and created pleasure gardens. The folly, known as Hilston Tower, may date from this time, or from the late 18th century.	II	PGW(Gt)22(MON)	Hilston Park
Itton Court	Itton; ST 49252 95517; 51°39′22″N 2°44′06″W	1 February 2022	Park	A landscape park with evidence of developments from the 17th to the 20th centuries, Itton Court is the longtime home of the Curre family. The estate includes features from the 17th, 18th and 19th centuries, remains a private home and is considered a "good example of an historic park and garden, which survives in its entirety".	II	PGW(Gt)21(MON)	Itton Court
The Kymin	Monmouth; SO 52765 12498; 51°48′33″N 2°41′11″W	1 February 2022	Garden	The Kymin was developed in the late 18th century as a picnic spot and bowling green by members of the Monmouth Picnic Club, a group of the "first gentlemen" of the town. The Round Tower was constructed as a banqueting house and the Monmouth antiquarian Charles Heath recorded in his 1807 history, Descriptive Account of the Kymin Pavilion and Beaulieu Grove with their various views; also a description of the Naval Temple, that ten counties could be seen from its upper storey (Gloucestershire, Monmouthshire, Glamorganshire, Breconshire, Montgomeryshire, Worcestershire, Herefordshire, Radnorshire, Shropshire and Somerset). After 1800 the Naval Temple was built to celebrate Britain's maritime victories. Sir Richard Colt Hoare, who visited in 1803, was unimpressed, describing it as "in very bad taste".	II	PGW(Gt)5(MON)	The Kymin
Linda Vista Gardens	Abergavenny; SO 29534 14096; 51°49′16″N 3°01′26″W	1 February 2022	Urban park	A small urban park developed in the mid 20th century from a private garden laid out in the 1870s. In the 1950s, the gardens passed to the local authority, which redeveloped them as a public park, and extended them through inclusion of adjacent pockets of land including Castle Meadow.	II	PGW(Gt)59(MON)	Linda Vista Gardens
Llanarth Court	Llanarth; SO 37972 10519; 51°47′24″N 2°54′03″W	1 February 2022	Park	An early 19th century park, with landscaping which Cadw suggests may originally have been undertaken by Samuel Lapidge, who trained under Capability Brown, and subsequently by John Claudius Loudon. Much has been lost, the lake is silted up, and the formal gardens have largely returned to pasture.	II	PGW(Gt)13(MON)	Llanarth Court
Llanvihangel Court	Llanvihangel Crucorney; SO 32781 20411; 51°52′42″N 2°58′40″W	1 February 2022	Park	The court was owned in the 17th century by John Arnold, a noted persecutor of Catholics. Remnants of his important park survive, including avenues of Scots pine and sweet chestnut to the north and south. The estate includes a "great rarity", stables dating from Arnold's time, which have their own Grade I listing designation.	I	PGW(Gt)14(MON)	Llanvihangel Court
Llangibby House	Llangybi; ST 36927 97303; 51°40′15″N 2°54′48″W	1 February 2022	Park	The house was demolished in the 1950s and its gardens are largely ruined. In the 18th century the bailey of Tregrug Castle in the grounds was used as a bowling green. An avenue of Scots pine runs from the site of the house down to the River Usk. (Note: John Newman, in his contribution to the third volume of the Gwent County History, The Making of Monmouthshire, 1536-1780, published in 2009, notes that the avenue, planted in 1707, is still maintained into the 21st century.)	II	PGW(Gt)27(MON)	Llangibby House
Llanover Park	Llanover; SO 32150 08061; 51°46′02″N 2°59′05″W	1 February 2022	Park	In the 19th century Llanover was the home of Augusta Hall, Baroness Llanover and of her husband, Benjamin. A noted champion of Welsh culture, Lady Llanover was known as "Gwenynen Gwent", ('the bee of Gwent'). The Halls' house was demolished in the 20th century, but the gardens, parkland and estate village survive.	II*	PGW(Gt)41(MON)	Llanover Park
Llantilio Court	Llantilio Crossenny; SO 40166 15045; 51°49′51″N 2°52′11″W	1 February 2022	Park	The parkland to the, now demolished, Llantilio Court. The gardens, including a lakeside Japanese garden, are mostly lost, but the outlines of the park survive, including a number of Wellingtonia which once lined the main drive.	II	PGW(Gt)7(MON)	Llantilio Court
Lower Duffryn House	Grosmont; SO 43518 22730; 51°54′01″N 2°49′20″W	1 February 2022	Garden	The garden contains rare remnants of a Tudor layout including walling, terraces and fishponds. Now an "extraordinarily remote (and) melancholy" farmhouse, the house was built in the mid 17th century by the Cecil family. The garden comprises a long terrace, bordered by stone walls, and is thought to date from the time of the house's construction. The fishponds may also date from this time or may be earlier, mediaeval features. A gazebo is set into one of the terrace walls. Aerial photography suggests that the gardens were once more extensive.	II	PGW(Gt)24(MON)	Lower Duffryn House
Mathern Palace	Mathern; ST 52290 90821; 51°36′51″N 2°41′26″W	1 February 2022	Garden	Originally an episcopal palace of the mediaeval Bishops of Llandaff, the building was restored from 1894 by Henry Avray Tipping as his home. Tipping laid out the gardens in an Arts and Crafts style. They consist of lawns, paths, terraces with limestone walls, pools and ponds, and a rose garden. Tipping made use of some of the remaining walls from the palace, incorporating them into his overall design.	II*	PGW(Gt)35(MON)	Mathern Palace
Mounton House	Mounton; ST 51299 93054; 51°38′03″N 2°42′18″W	1 February 2022	Garden	The house and garden are by Henry Avray Tipping, assisted by Eric Francis, a local architect from Chepstow, Mounton was completed in the first decades of the 20th century, between the reconstruction of Mathern Palace and the building of High Glanau. The gardens were designed in Tipping's usual Arts & Crafts style, and include formal gardens to the south of the house and a wild garden to the west. A number of the features within the gardens have their own listed status, including pergolas, urns, a tea house, the garden walls and three gardeners' cottages.	II*	PGW(Gt)8(MON)	Mounton House
Moynes Court	Mathern; ST 52010 90964; 51°36′56″N 2°41′40″W	1 February 2022	Garden	The bones of a mediaeval and Tudor garden, with extant walls and fish ponds, but the planting is entirely of the 20th and 21st centuries. The walling is largely intact and the Commission notes its historic importance.	II	PGW(Gt)34(MON)	Moynes Court
Nelson Garden	Monmouth; SO 50779 12728; 51°48′40″N 2°42′55″W	1 February 2022	Garden	An 18th century town house garden, with a pavilion which commemorates a visit to the town by Lord Nelson in 1802. The original summerhouse was replaced in the 1840s, but elements, including Nelson's seat, were incorporated into the new structure. The garden is now managed by a trust which seeks to restore the garden, ensure its future and enable public access.	II	PGW(Gt)57(MON)	Nelson Garden
New Cemetery	Llanfoist, Abergavenny; SO 29856 14011; 51°49′05″N 3°01′52″W	1 February 2022	Cemetery	The Royal Commission on the Ancient and Historical Monuments of Wales (RCAHMW) describes New Cemetery as a "good example of a well-preserved Victorian landscaped garden cemetery." To the south-west of the town, the cemetery was laid out at the end of the 19th century with much evergreen planting with graves and tombs accessed via gravel paths.	II	PGW(Gt)37(MON)	New Cemetery
Pant-y-Goitre House	Llanfair Kilgeddin; SO 34569 08678; 51°46′23″N 2°56′59″W	1 February 2022	Park	The park to a much altered and extended house, laid out from 1770 with woods, a lake, lodges and a ha-ha. The pleasure gardens, which stand closer to the house, include a restored orangery dating from the 1830s. The planting, including large numbers of rhododendrons, is typically Victorian.	II	PGW(Gt)10(MON)	Pant-y-Goitre House
Penhein	Llanvair Discoed; ST 44971 93144; 51°38′04″N 2°47′47″W	1 February 2022	Park	An early 19th century park with some notable specimen trees including American redwoods and a monkey puzzle. The small garden contains a Victorian nuttery (an orchard of nut-bearing trees) the condition of which, like other elements of the garden, has deteriorated.	II	PGW(Gt)53(MON)	Penhein
Piercefield House	St Arvans; ST 52810 95680; 51°39′28″N 2°41′01″W	1 February 2022	Park	The Commission considers Piercefield the "par excellence outstanding example of an early 'sublime' landscape." The park is listed jointly with The Wyndcliff. The latter offers panoramic views over the Lancaut cliffs to the River Wye, while the former contains many remnants of a walk that became an essential element of the Wye Tour in the 18th and early 19th centuries, including the Giant's Cave, a grotto and a number of viewing points. Piercefield House itself is a ruin that is not publicly accessible but access to the grounds can be made via public footpaths.	I	PGW(Gt)40(MON)	Piercefield House
Raglan Castle	Raglan; SO 41343 08373; 51°46′15″N 2°51′05″W	1 February 2022	Garden	The gardens at Raglan are almost entirely concealed under pasture, but their Grade I listing indicates their significance. The RCAHMW suggests they are an "outstandingly important sixteenth- and early seventeenth-century garden layout which was one of the most advanced gardens of its date in the country." Developed from the 1550s by the Earls of Worcester to complement their "fortress-palace", the gardens comprised a long bank of three terraces to the north, leading down to a large lake known as the 'great poole'; a bowling green and a moat walk around the Great Tower; and elaborate parterres and water gardens to the east. (Note: Elisabeth Whittle, in her 1992 volume, Glamorgan and Gwent, records that the remains of the water gardens could still be seen in the valley below the castle, "as boggy, iris-filled ditches and low mounds and banks.")	I	PGW(Gt)42(MON)	Raglan Castle
Shirenewton Hall	Shirenewton; ST 47998 93463; 51°38′15″N 2°45′10″W	1 February 2022	Garden	The gardens date mainly from the 19th and early 20th centuries, and include Chinese and Japanese-influenced gardens, created by the then owner Charles Liddell who had made his fortune through trading in the East. An arbor, in a neoclassical style, and a summerhouse, in the Chinoiserie taste, decorate the grounds.	II*	PGW(Gt)46(MON)	Shirenewton Hall
St John's House	Monmouth; SO 50737 12784; 51°48′41″N 2°42′58″W	1 February 2022	Garden	A town house garden dating from the dating from the 19th century. It contains a cast iron Coalbrookdale verandah which can be dated to between 1840 and 1872, the period in which its manufacturer advertised it for sale. A former tennis court, laid out just before the First World War, is now lawned.	II	PGW(Gt)47(MON)	St John's House
St Pierre Park	Mathern; ST 51506 90573; 51°36′43″N 2°42′06″W	1 February 2022	Park	The park, and the ancient mansion, are almost completely enveloped by the St Pierre Golf and Country Club, but traces of the 18th century park, and the earlier deer park, remain. Fallow deer grazed in the park until the early 20th century. The parkland includes a long enclosure wall and a large lake. Much of the gardens and the wider park is now utilised as a golf course.	II	PGW(Gt)29(MON)	St Pierre Park
Tal-y-coed Court	Llanvihangel-Ystern-Llewern; SO 42127 15210; 51°49′57″N 2°50′29″W	1 February 2022	Garden	The Tal-y-coed estate was owned by Joseph Bradney, an antiquarian and author of A History of Monmouthshire from the Coming of the Normans into Wales down to the Present Time, a multi-volume history of the county published between 1904 and 1932. Bradney had a new house built and laid out the gardens and park in the 1880s and 1890s. The gardens are laid out as terraces which are revetted with stone walls and give views over a lake.	II	PGW(Gt)52(MON)	Tal-y-coed Court
Treowen	Mitchel Troy; SO 46153 11109; 51°47′46″N 2°46′56″W	1 February 2022	Garden	There remain a few remnants of an early 17th century garden. These are now largely covered by lawns but elements of the garden, which was developed at the same time as the house, are traceable, including earthworks, walkways and walls. There are mediaeval fishponds which pre-date the house and were restored in the late 20th century. At the same time stone carvings, which were also identified as being of earlier origin than the house, were discovered in the grounds and were re-used in the modern restoration.	II	PGW(Gt)23(MON)	Treowen
Trewyn House	Llanvihangel Crucorney; SO 32872 22846; 51°54′00″N 2°58′37″W	1 February 2022	Park	Elements of the gardens and a small landscape park were developed in the 18th century and re-worked in the 19th. Features include terraces and pools. The grounds include a listed dovecote and the gate piers and gates, which frame what John Newman describes as the "ceremonious" setting for the house, and which have their own Grade II* listing.	II	PGW(Gt)28(MON)	Trewyn House
Troy House	Monmouth; SO 50935 11352; 51°47′55″N 2°42′46″W	1 February 2022	Park	Troy was built c.1670 by Henry Somerset, 1st Duke of Beaufort as a wedding gift to his son Charles. The gardens and park contain elements typical of a country estate, including an important walled kitchen garden which has a separate Grade II* listing. The estate remains privately owned and was sold at auction, with the house in a state of considerable dilapidation, in 2021.	II*	PGW(Gt)16(MON)	Troy House
Wonastow Court	Wonastow; SO 48877 10983; 51°47′43″N 2°44′34″W	1 February 2022	Garden	The remains of an early garden and park, dating from the 16th or 17th centuries. In the 16th century the manor of Wonastow was owned by the Herbert family who built a Tudor mansion on the site. This was later reduced and remodelled as a country house. The gardens date from the earlier period and include an avenue of lime trees which largely survives.	II	PGW(Gt)56(MON)	Wonastow Court
Wyelands	Mathern; ST 52358 91923; 51°37′27″N 2°41′23″W	1 February 2022	Park	An early 19th century park which is largely unaltered, the estate was developed at the same time as the house. The villa was designed by Robert Lugar for George Buckle, Sheriff of Monmouthshire in the early 19th century. Cadw notes the largely unaltered state of both the house and the park, except for some redevelopment of the former in the 20th century.	II	PGW(Gt)51(MON)	Wyelands
Wyndcliffe Court	St Arvans; ST 51798 97252; 51°40′19″N 2°41′54″W	1 February 2022	Garden	A major Arts and Crafts garden by Henry Avray Tipping, laid out in 1922 for the owner of the court, Charles Clay. Tipping again worked with Eric Francis, who also designed the house, to create a terraced garden with wide views over the Bristol Channel. Elements of the gardens, including the terraces, steps, pool, pergola and summerhouse have their own Grade II* listings.	II*	PGW(Gt)4(MON)	Wyndcliffe Court

== See also ==
- List of scheduled monuments in Monmouthshire
- Grade I listed buildings in Monmouthshire
- Grade II* listed buildings in Monmouthshire

== Sources ==
- Clark, Arthur (1980). The Story of Monmouthshire, Volume 1, From the earliest times to the Civil War. Monmouth, Wales: Monnow Press. ISBN 978-0-950-66181-0.
- — (1979). The Story of Monmouthshire, Volume 2, From the Civil War to Present Times. Monmouth, Wales: Monnow Press. ISBN 978-0-950-66180-3.
- Evans, Cyril James Oswald (1953). Monmouthshire: Its History and Topography. Cardiff: William Lewis Printers. OCLC 2415203.
- Gerrish, Helena (2011). Edwardian Country Life: The Story of Henry Avray Tipping. London: Frances Lincoln. ISBN 978-0-711-23223-5. OCLC 765305877.
- — (2015). A Guide to the Gardens at High Glanau Manor. London: Ziggurat Design.
- Heath, Charles (1807). Descriptive Account of the Kymin Pavilion and Beaulieu Grove with their various views; also a description of the Naval Temple. Monmouth: Charles Heath. OCLC 84200287.
- Kenyon, John R. (2008). "Masonry castles and castle-building". In Griffiths, Ralph A.; Hopkins, Tony; Howell, Ray (eds.). The Age of the Marcher Lords, c.1070–1536. The Gwent County History. Vol. 2. Cardiff: University of Wales Press. ISBN 978-0-7083-2072-3. OCLC 836831938.
- McCloy, Robert (2013). "Local government". In Williams, Chris; Croll, Andy; Griffiths, Ralph A. (eds.). The Twentieth Century. The Gwent County History. Vol. 5. Cardiff: University of Wales Press. ISBN 978-0-7083-2648-0. OCLC 855346482.
- Newman, John (2000). Gwent/Monmouthshire. The Buildings of Wales. London: Penguin. ISBN 978-0-140-71053-3.
- — (2009). "Buildings in the Landscape". In Gray, Madeleine; Morgan, Prys; Griffiths, Ralph A. (eds.). The Making of Monmouthshire, c.1536–1780. The Gwent County History. Vol. 3. Cardiff: University of Wales Press. ISBN 978-0-7083-2198-0. OCLC 552064875.
- Turner, Rick (2006) [2002]. Chepstow Castle. Cardiff: Cadw. ISBN 978-1-857-60229-6.
- Whittle, Elisabeth (1992). The Historic Gardens of Wales. Cardiff: CADW. ISBN 978-0-117-01578-4.
- — (1992). Glamorgan and Gwent. Guide to Ancient and Historic Wales. London: HMSO. ISBN 978-0-117-01221-9.
