= Roman Catholic Church of St Teresa of Lisieux, Taunton =

Church of St Teresa of Lisieux
- Roman Catholic Church of St Teresa of Lisieux, Taunton
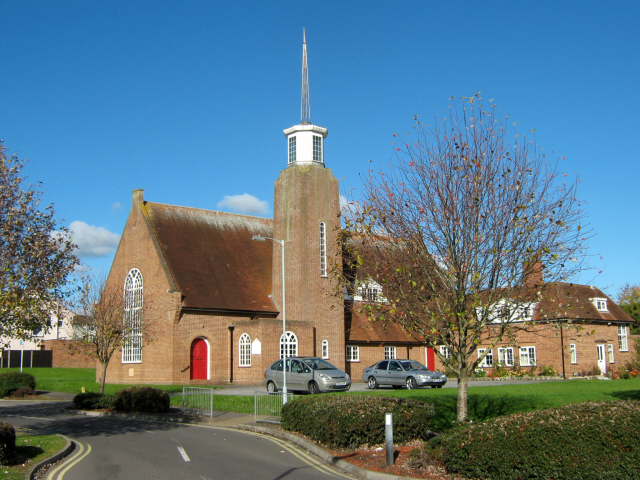
- Church of St Teresa of Lisieux

- Location within Somerset Location within England
- 51.0315°N 3.0898°W
- Location: Taunton, Somerset
- Country: England
- Denomination: Roman Catholic
- Website: tauntonvalecatholics.com

History
- Status: Functioning
- Dedication: Thérèse of Lisieux

Architecture
- Heritage designation: Grade II
- Architect: Eric Francis
- Years built: 1958–1959
- Construction cost: £18,000

Administration
- Diocese: Diocese of Clifton
- Deanery: St Dunstan

Listed Building – Grade II
- Official name: Roman Catholic Church of St Teresa of Lisieux and attached presbytery
- Designated: 11 November 2016
- Reference no.: 1438078

The Roman Catholic Church of St Teresa of Lisieux in Taunton, Somerset, England, dates from 1958–1959. It is the only known church design of Eric Francis, a Chepstow-born architect who worked mainly in Monmouthshire and the South-West of England. St Teresa's is a functioning parish church within the Roman Catholic Diocese of Clifton, and a Grade II listed building.

== History and design ==
Eric Francis (1887–1976) was born in Chepstow, Wales. Articled as an architect in 1909, he trained under Guy Dawber and Detmar Blow. He specialised in smaller country houses, including a number in Monmouthshire in collaboration with Henry Avray Tipping. (Note: Francis's works with Tipping include Mounton House and High Glanau.) (Note: Works by Francis alone include Wyndcliffe Court, although Tipping led on the design of the gardens, and Chepstow War Memorial.) In the 1920s he moved to West Monkton, Somerset, undertaking a number of works in the area until his death in 1976.

The Church of St Teresa of Lisieux was commissioned by the Roman Catholic Diocese of Clifton in 1958. Established as an outreach church of St George's Roman Catholic Church, Taunton, it was planned to serve a new council housing estate at Lyngford. Francis designed the church, the accompanying presbytery and a parish hall, but the last was not built. His contractors were Messrs Stansell & Son. The foundation stone was laid by Joseph Rudderham, Bishop of Clifton, in 1958 and the structure was complete by 1959. It remains a functioning parish church.

Julian Orbach and Nikolaus Pevsner, in their Somerset: South and West volume of the Buildings of England series, describe the church as a "striking" design, "between Georgian and Swedish Modern". The construction material is red brick, with steep tiled roofs and a flèche "like a radio mast". The church was designated a Grade II listed building in 2016.

== Sources ==
- Gerrish, Helena (2011). Edwardian Country Life: The Story of H. Avray Tipping. London: Frances Lincoln. ISBN 978-0-7112-3223-5. OCLC 765305877.
- Orbach, Julian; Pevsner, Nikolaus (2014). Somerset: South and West. The Buildings of England. New Haven, US and London: Yale University Press. ISBN 978-0-300-20740-8. OCLC 1000807202.
