= Rhiwbina Garden Village =

Residential area in Cardiff, Wales

Coordinates: 51°31′23″N 3°12′56″W

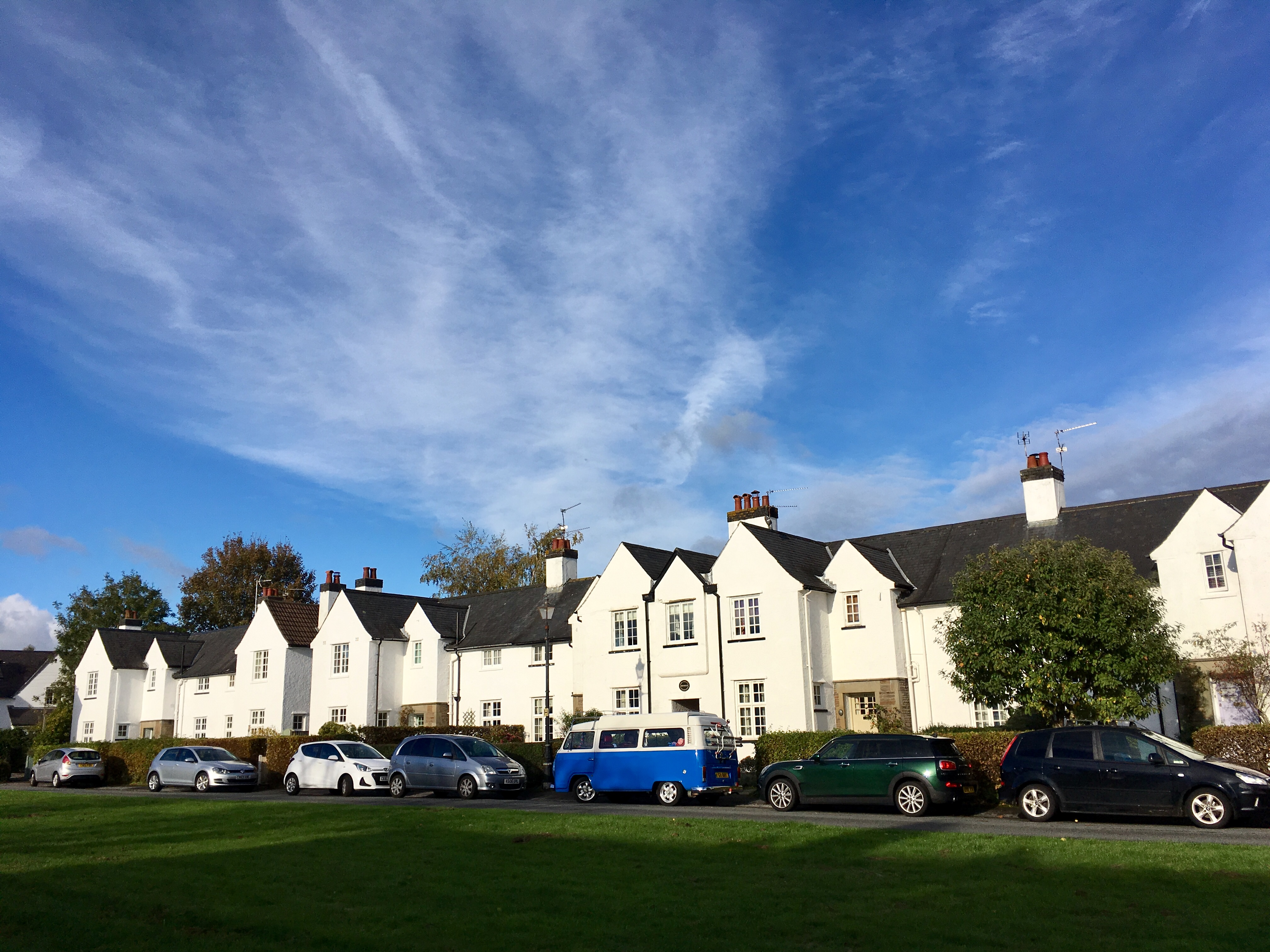
11 to 14 Y Groes in Rhiwbina Garden Village

Rhiwbina Garden Village (Welsh: Pentref Gardd Rhiwbeina) is a residential development in Rhiwbina, a northern suburb of Cardiff. It was begun in 1912 to a masterplan by Raymond Unwin, one of the leading architects of the Garden city movement. Unwin's plans were commissioned by the Cardiff Worker's Cooperative Garden Village Society Ltd. The society had been established by several Cardiff academics including the economist Herbert Stanley Jevons. The garden village was subsequently developed by the society on farmland bought from the Jenner family of Wenvoe Castle.

The first 34 houses were built in 1913 and more were built from 1919 to 1923, occupying an area between Pen-y-dre and Lon Isa which became known as Rhiwbina Garden Village. It was designated as a Conservation Area in 1976.

Properties were initially rented from the Rhiwbina Garden Village Society, which was run as a co-operative by the residents. The houses were subsequently sold to existing tenants in the 1960s. Though initially planned as a housing development for the working class, the high rent of the properties ensured that the middle class became established in Rhiwbina Garden Village. It is the only garden village development in Cardiff, architecture critic John Newman describes it as the "most extensive and best preserved Garden Village in Glamorgan" in the Glamorgan edition of The Buildings of Wales. Rhiwbina Garden Village was designated a conservation area in 1977. The majority of the properties are listed with Cadw.

Lon-Y-Dail built from 1912 to 1913 was the first road developed, running from south to north. Lon Isa was next, and Y Groes, the oblong green forming the centre of a cul-de-sac, was created by their intersection. The houses of Y Groes were designed by A.H. Mottram; No. 7 Y Groes is dated 1913 and inscribed with the initials of the Cardiff Worker's Cooperative Garden Village Society. The houses of Pen-Y-Dre that run alongside the railway line were designed by H. Avray Tipping, though John Newman believes that Tipping's designs may have been ghosted by Eric Francis. Thomas Alwyn Lloyd designed the remainder of Pen-Y-Dre between 1920 and 1923. Lloyd also designed his own residence, 11 Heol Wen at the west end of the road.

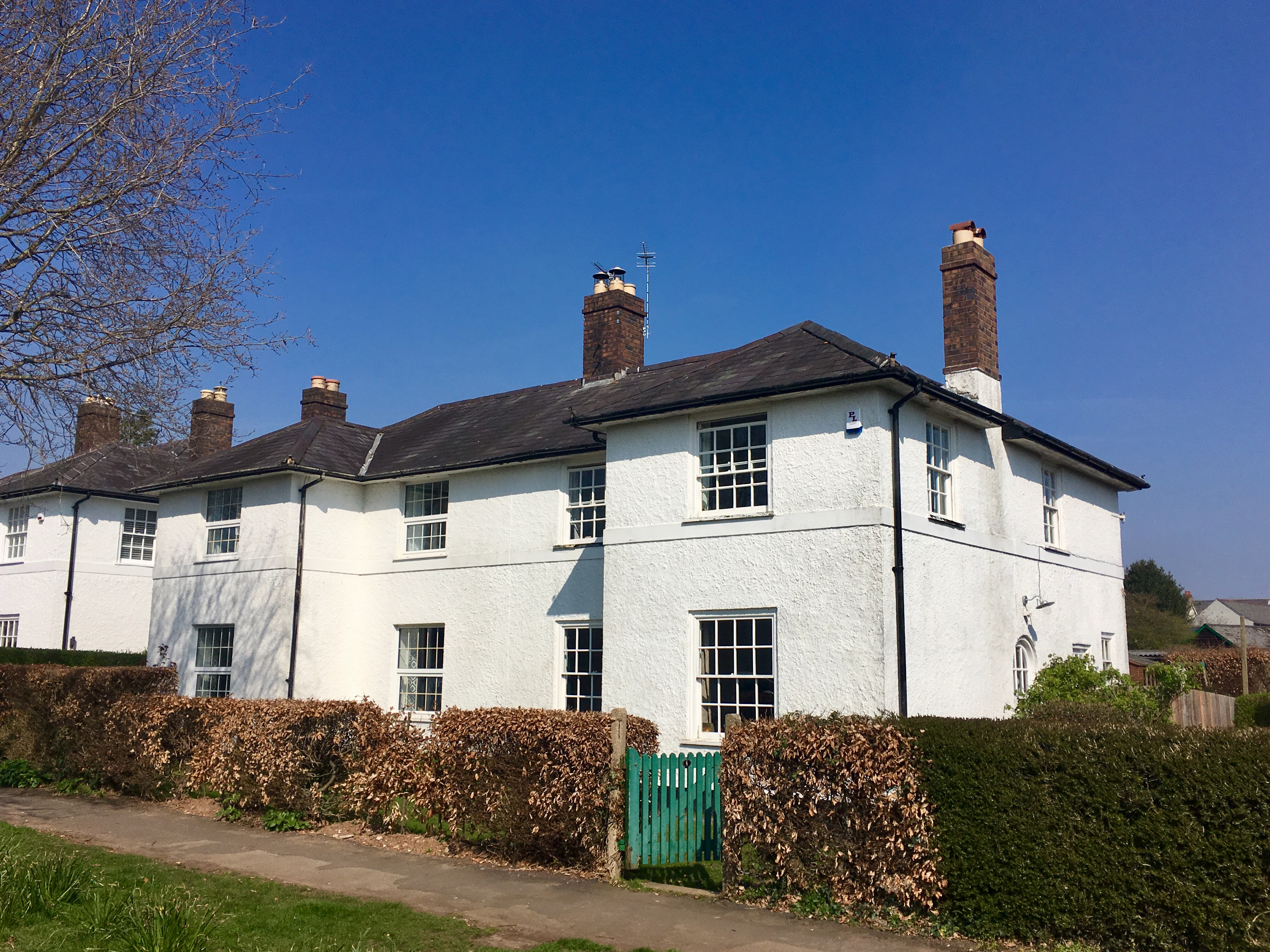
4 and 6 Lon-y-dail in Rhiwbina Garden Village

Scenes from the 2011 Doctor Who Christmas special, The Doctor, the Widow and the Wardrobe were filmed on Y Groes in the garden village.

Blue plaques erected by the Rhiwbina Civic Society in Rhiwbina Garden Village commemorate the residences of the founder of the St Fagans National Museum of History, Iorwerth Peate, in Lon-y-Dail, writer and Welsh nationalist Kate Roberts in Lon Isa, archaeologist Cyril Fox in Heol Wen, and social reformer Edgar Leyshon Chappell in Y Groes.

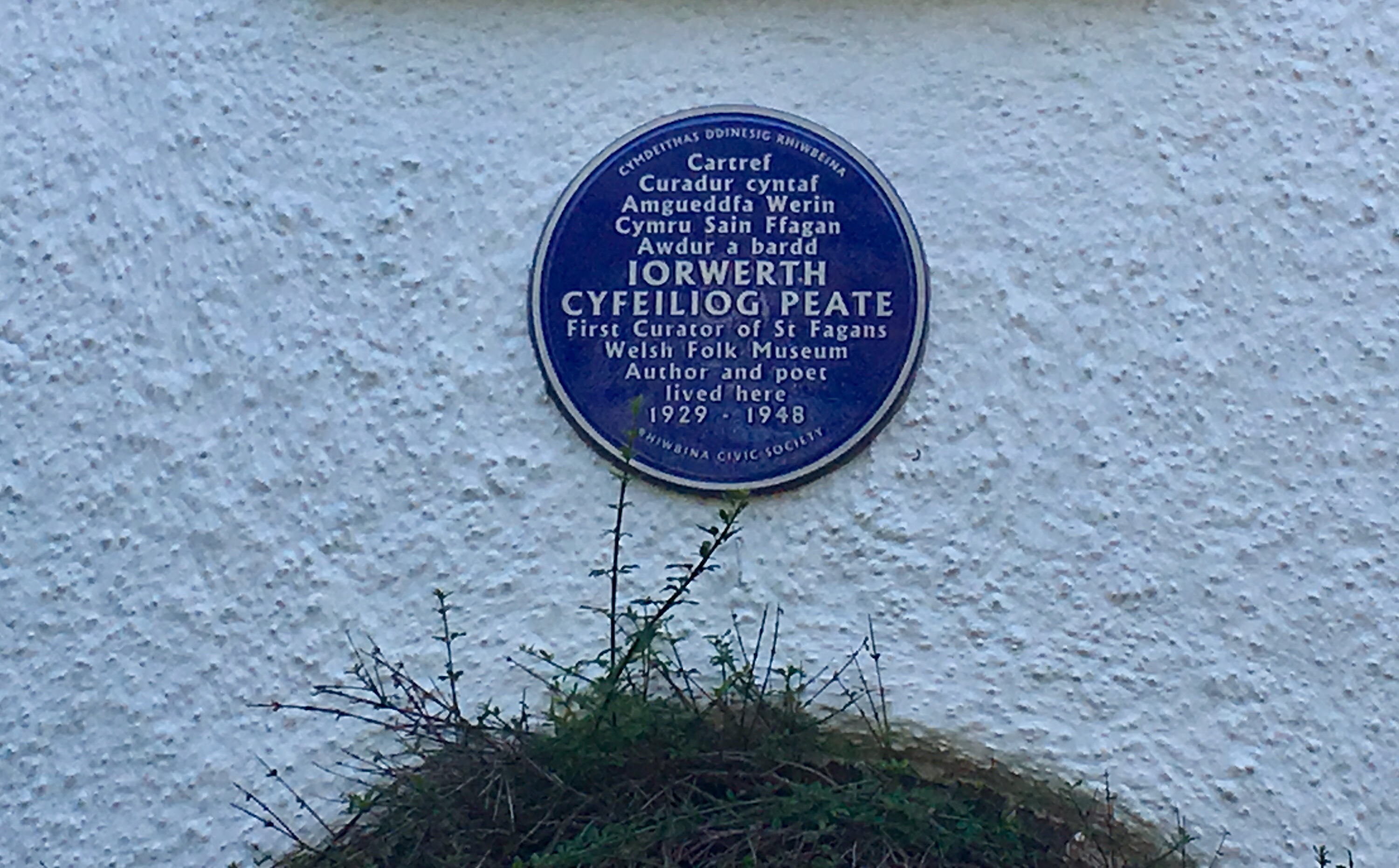
A blue plaque for Iorwerth Peate on Lon-y-Dail in Rhiwbina Garden Village

== Gallery ==
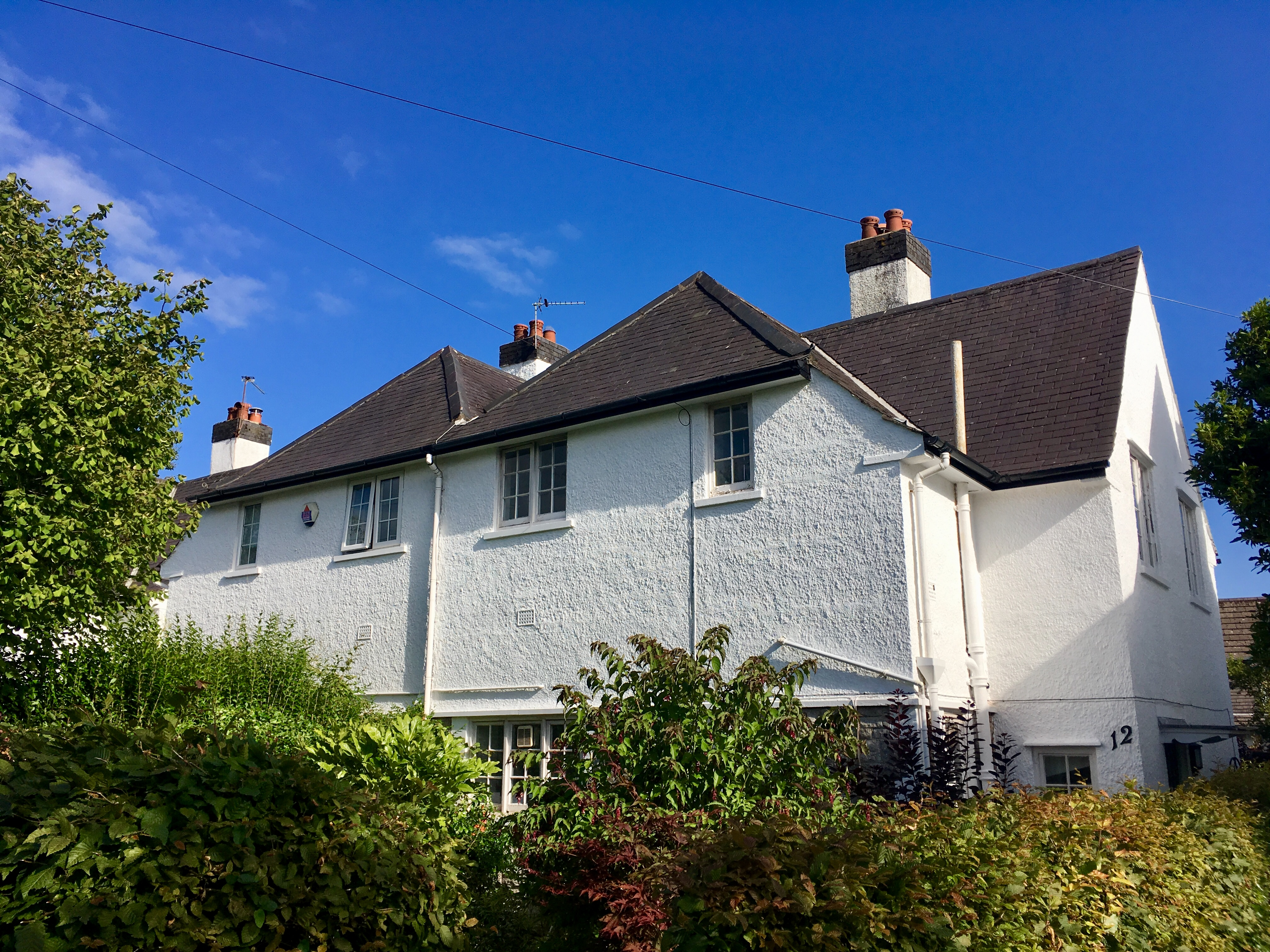
10 & 12 Lon Isa

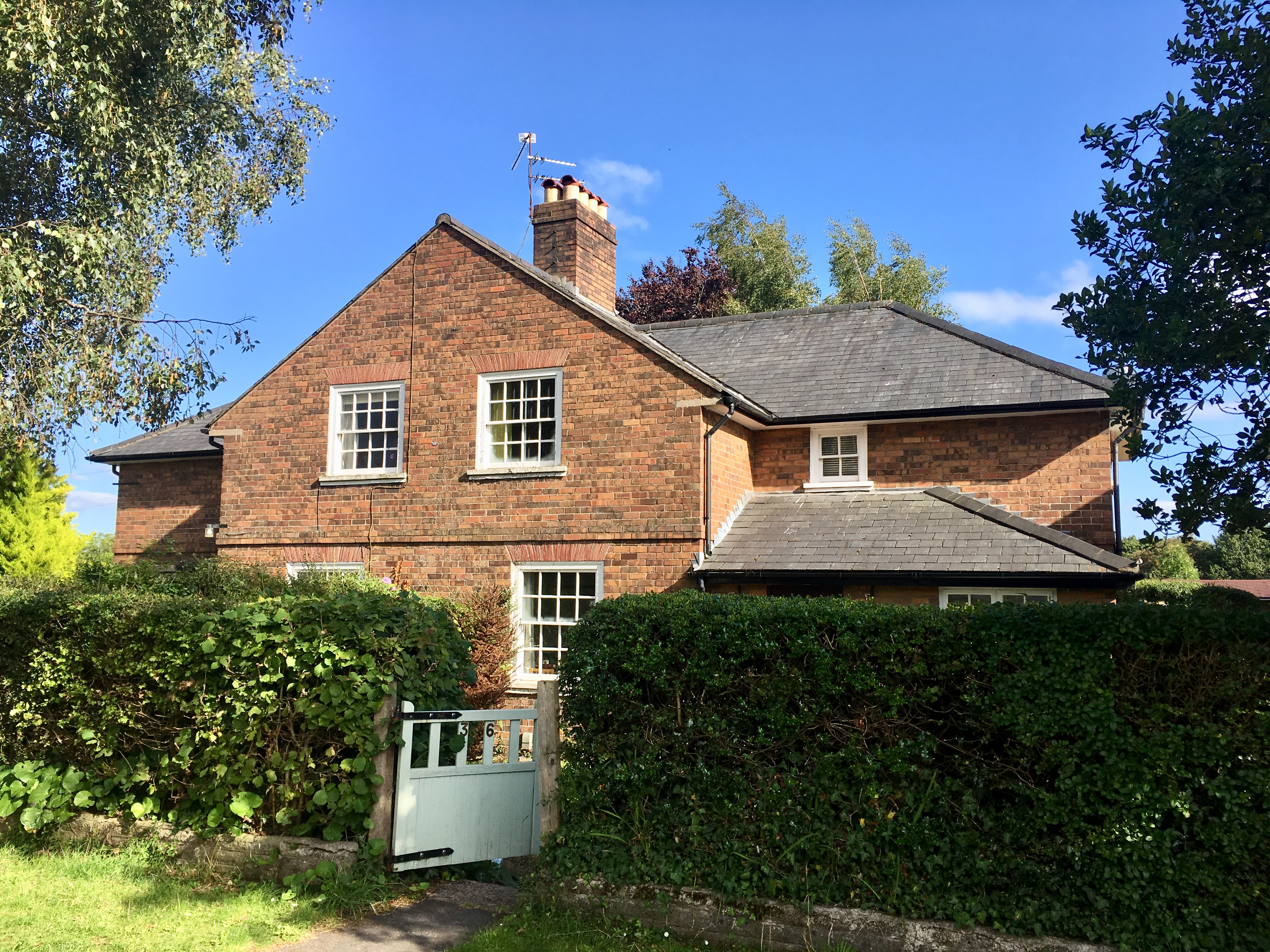
34 & 36 Lon Isa

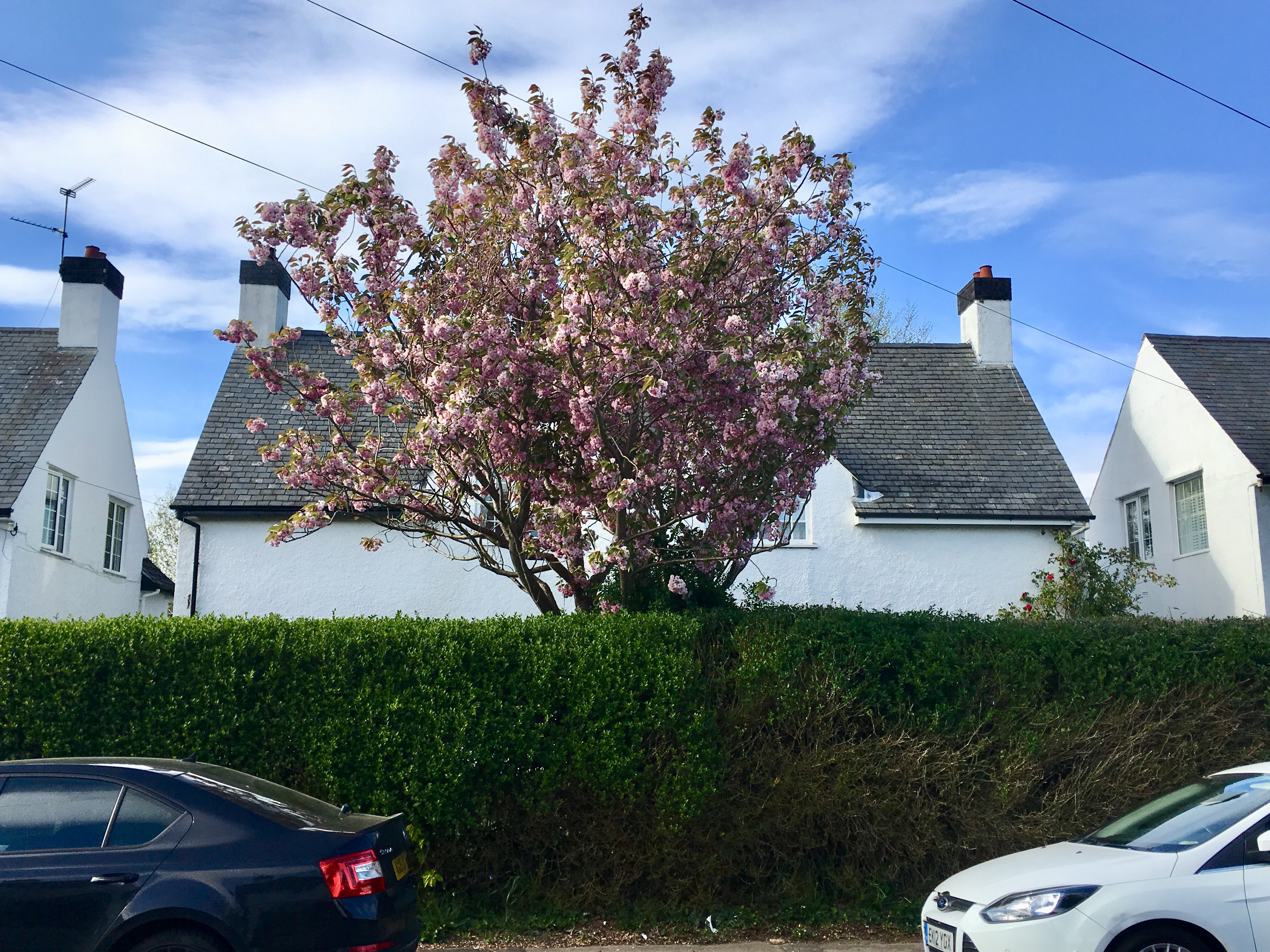
5 & 7 Lon Isa

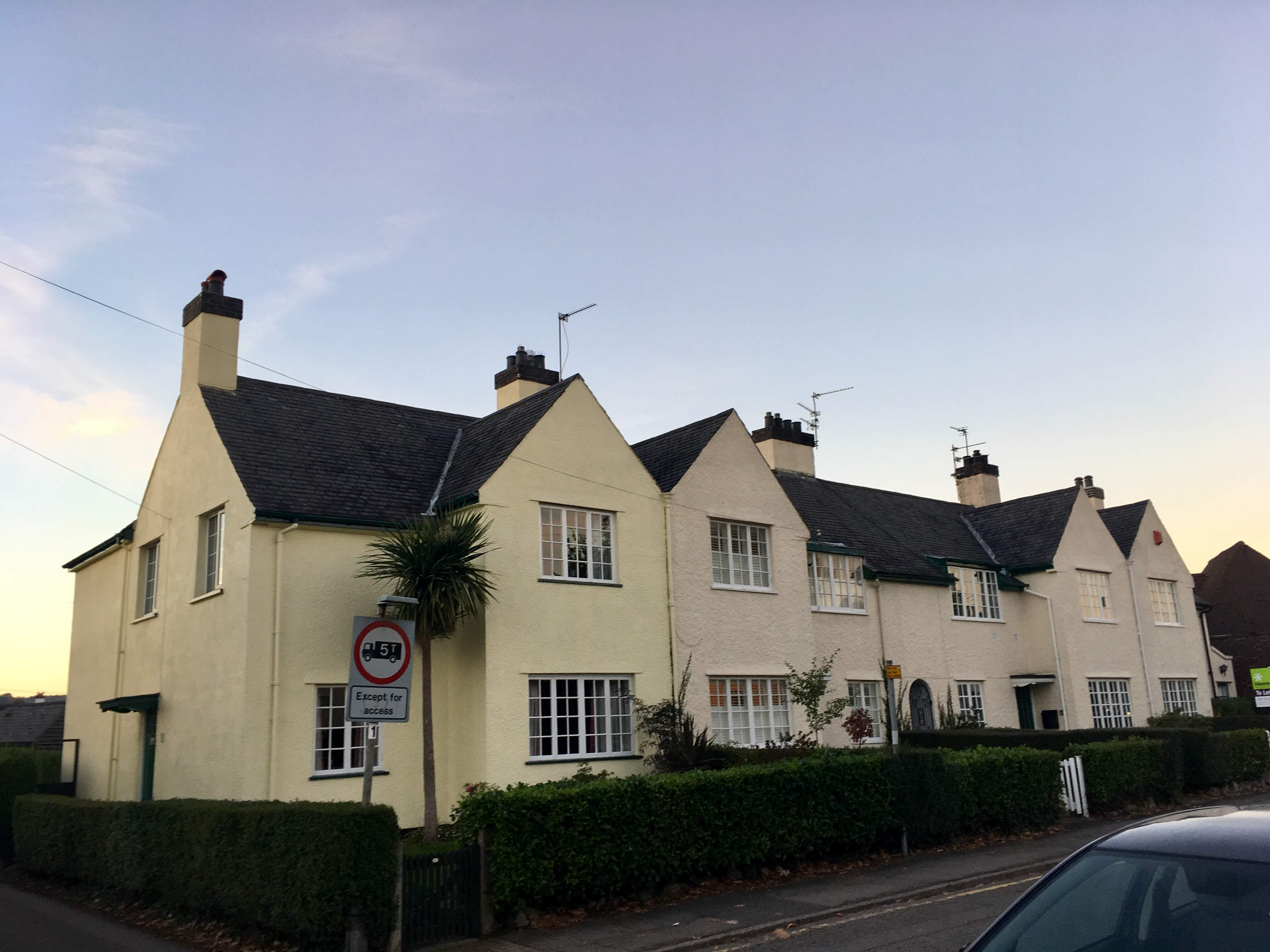
2-8 Pen-y-dre

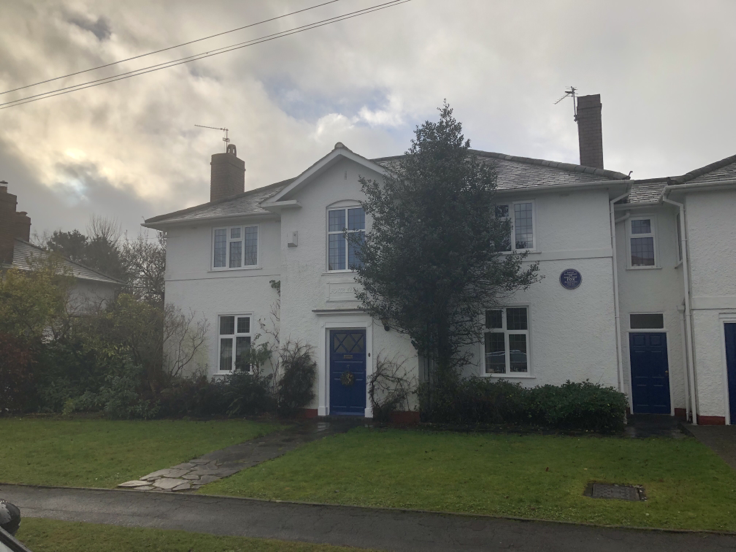
Four Elms, 17 Heol Wen
