= High Glanau =

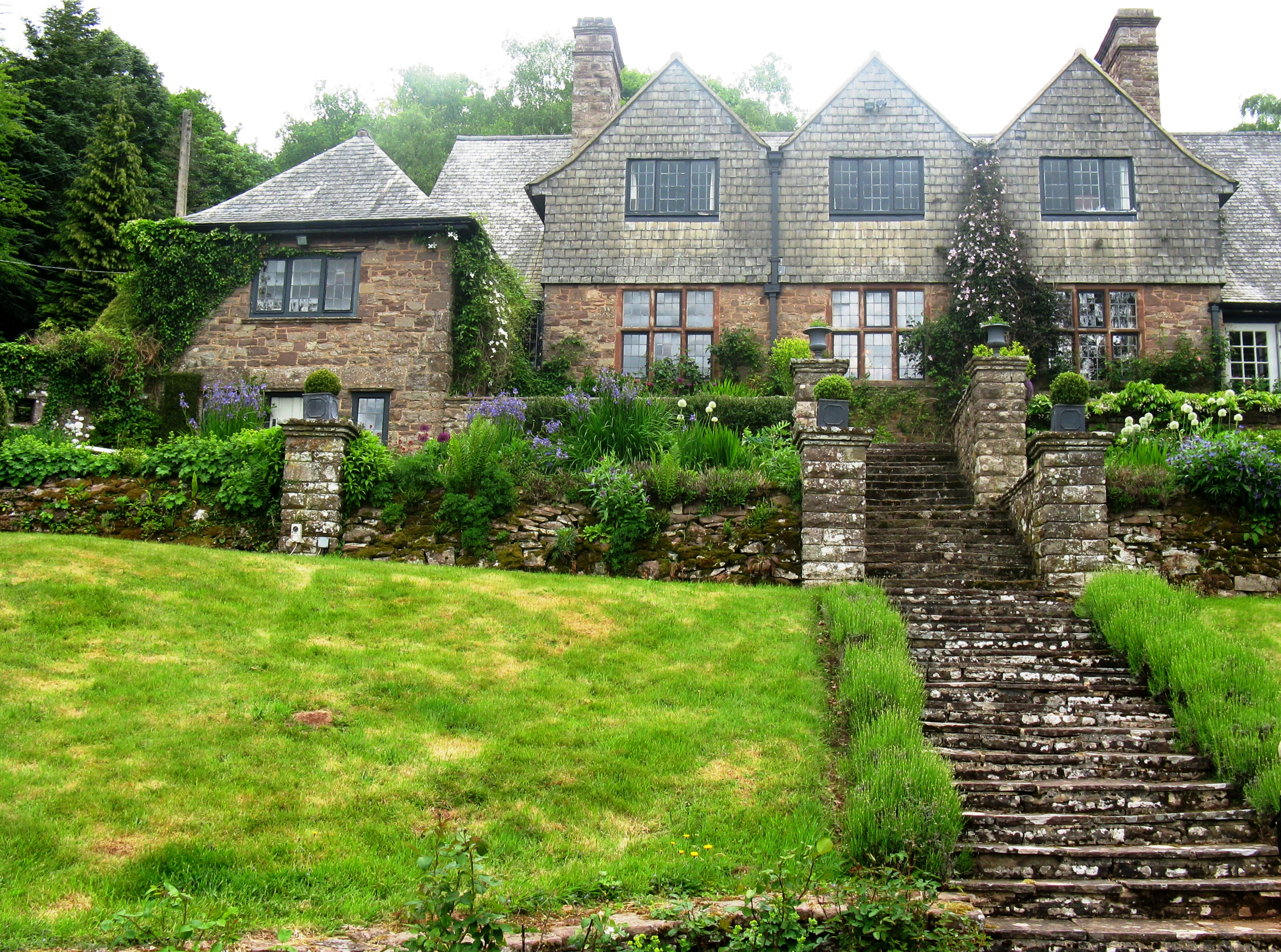

- Location within Monmouthshire
- 51.762989°N 2.728568°W
- Type: House
- Location: Cwmcarvan

History
- Built: 1922
- Built for: Henry Avray Tipping

Site notes
- Area: Monmouthshire
- Architect: Eric Francis
- Architectural style: Arts and Crafts
- Governing body: Privately owned

Cadw/ICOMOS Register of Parks and Gardens of Special Historic Interest in Wales
- Official name: High Glanau
- Designated: 1 February 2022
- Reference no.: PGW(Gt)45(Mon)
- Listing: Grade II*

Listed Building – Grade II*
- Official name: High Glanau
- Designated: 22 February 1989
- Reference no.: 2813

Listed Building – Grade II*
- Official name: Terraces at High Glanau
- Designated: 22 February 1989
- Reference no.: 2814

Listed Building – Grade II
- Official name: Garden wall and pergola at High Glanau
- Designated: 22 February 1989
- Reference no.: 2817

Listed Building – Grade II
- Official name: Gardener's Cottage at High Glanau
- Designated: 22 February 1989
- Reference no.: 2815

High Glanau (also known as High Glanau Manor) is a country house and Grade II* listed building within the community of Cwmcarvan, Monmouthshire, Wales. It is located about 5 miles (8.0 km) south-west of Monmouth, and 1.5 miles (2.4 km) north of Trellech, adjoining the B4293 road and with views westwards over the Vale of Usk. Commissioned by Henry Avray Tipping and designed by Eric Francis, it is particularly noted for its gardens which are listed at Grade II* on the Cadw/ICOMOS Register of Parks and Gardens of Special Historic Interest in Wales.

== History ==
Henry Avray Tipping (1855-1933) was born in France, the youngest of four sons, to a family of prosperous merchants. After reading history at Oxford, he moved to Monmouthshire, where he bought the Mathern Palace estate in 1894. (Note: Tipping purchased Mathern Palace from George Francis, a solicitor from Chepstow, and father of Eric.) While at Mathern he began his professional career as a writer, becoming editor of Country Life magazine, and developed his alternative career as an architect and garden designer, while expanding his circle of friends to include Edwin Lutyens, Edward Hudson, Gertrude Jekyll and Harold Peto. In 1912, after the death of his mother and the last of his three older brothers, Tipping moved to Mounton, north of Chepstow, and began the building of Mounton House, in collaboration with Eric Francis. By 1922, with Tipping planning his retirement, he again moved north, and again employed Francis to design his last home in Monmouthshire, High Glanau. Tipping had bought the 1,640 acre estate, near Trellech, as a rough shoot in 1917.

Tipping moved to London in 1930 and died in 1933. The house was given Grade II* listed building status on 22 February 1989. It is privately owned. The gardens are open to the public on several days each year.

== Architecture and description ==
High Glanua is designed in Francis favoured Arts and Crafts style. The front of the house is of two storeys, with three slate-hung gables between two chimneystacks. On the upper entrance side there is a broad slate roof with a pair of gabled turrets. The house is set above formal gardens, with stone-walled terraces and an octagonal pond. The gardens were created by Tipping between 1922 and 1929. Several cottages around the estate were built by Francis for Tipping at about the same time.

== Garden ==
The gardens are described by the National Gardens Scheme as having a "pergola, herbaceous borders, Edwardian glasshouse, rhododendrons, azaleas, tulips, orchard with wild flowers and woodland walks". The pergola columns are the original stone, but the oak crossing beams have been replaced, a restoration funded by Cadw. The terraces are highly structured, with steps, walls and piers, although some architectural features, such as finials and urns were stolen in the 1990s. The terraces have their own Grade II* listing. The garden wall and pergola, greenhouse, gardener's cottage and garage are all listed Grade II. The garden historian Elisabeth Whittle describes High Glanau, along with Tipping's other gardens at Mathern Palace, Mounton House and Wyndcliffe Court as "four of the best Welsh gardens of (the Arts and Crafts) period". The gardens themselves are listed at Grade II* on the Cadw/ICOMOS Register of Parks and Gardens of Special Historic Interest in Wales.

== Sources ==
- Attlee, Helena (2009). The Gardens of Wales. London: Frances Lincoln. ISBN 978-0-7112-2882-5.
- Bradney, Joseph Alfred (1994) [1929]. The Hundred of Caldicot, first part. Cardiff, Wales: Merton Priory Press. ISBN 978-1-873-36116-0.
- Gerrish, Helena (2011). Edwardian Country Life: The Story of Henry Avray Tipping. London: Frances Lincoln. ISBN 978-0-7112-3223-5. OCLC 765305877.
- Gerrish, Helena (2015). A Guide to the Gardens at High Glanau Manor. London: Ziggurat Design.
- Newman, John (2000). Gwent/Monmouthshire. The Buildings of Wales. London: Penguin. ISBN 0-14-071053-1.
- Whittle, Elisabeth (1992). The Historic Gardens of Wales. Cardiff: CADW. ISBN 9780117015784.
