= Eric Francis (architect) =

British architect and painter

Eric Carwardine Francis
- Born: 30 August 1887; Chepstow, Monmouthshire, Wales
- Died: 26 January 1976 (aged 88); West Monkton, Somerset, England
- Occupation: Architect

Eric Carwardine Francis (30 August 1887 – 26 January 1976) was a British architect and painter who designed a number of notable buildings, particularly in Monmouthshire, Gloucestershire and Somerset, in the early and mid-twentieth century, many in the Arts and Crafts style.

== Life and career ==
He was the son of George Carwardine Francis, a solicitor of Chepstow. (Note: George Francis bought the Mathern Palace estate in 1889 and sold it to Henry Avray Tipping in 1894.) He was articled in 1909 as an architect under Sir Guy Dawber, before becoming an assistant to another leading member of the profession, Detmar Blow.

He then began working with the writer and architectural historian Henry Avray Tipping. (Note: Cadw records Francis' first work for Tipping being at Mathern Palace. However, Francis was a child when Tipping restored the house in the 1890s. Neither John Newman, in his Monmouthshire/Gwent volume of the Pevsner Buildings of Wales, nor Helena Gerrish, in her life of Tipping, Edwardian Country Life: The Story of H. Avray Tipping, record Francis as being involved at Mathern.) Inheriting a family fortune in 1911, Tipping then bought land at Mounton near Chepstow on which he built a new home. While Tipping described himself as the designer of Mounton House, Francis was responsible for its details and materials. He also worked with Tipping on houses for the Rhiwbina Garden Village estate in the suburbs of Cardiff. (Note: Newman, in his Glamorgan volume of the Pevsner Buildings of Wales, records the attribution to Tipping but notes "probably ghosted by Eric Francis".) Francis subsequently undertook reconstruction work at Pencoed Castle for Lord Rhondda and built a new house on the site for Lady Rhondda after her husband’s death.

In 1921, Francis designed the "unusual, neo-Baroque" War Memorial in Beaufort Square at Chepstow, unveiled in January 1922. In the same year, he began work for another private client in the area, Charles Clay, of the family that owned the nearby Piercefield estate. For Clay, Francis built Wyndcliffe Court at St Arvans, a large house completed in 1922. The architectural historian John Newman describes Wyndcliffe as in the "Cotswold Tudor style, relaxed and sophisticated". In 1922/23 he undertook work at Chepstow Castle for its owner, W. R. Lysaght, including refacing some of the walls in red sandstone. He also worked again with Avray Tipping on the design and construction of Tipping's retirement home, High Glanau near Trellech. The house is built in the Arts and Crafts style, and sits in formal gardens. In 1925, Francis designed and built his own house, East Cliff, situated above the River Wye at Tutshill near Chepstow. (Note: As at Autumn 2022, East Cliff is for sale.)

In 1926 Francis married Lady Elizabeth Annesley, a cousin of Earl Annesley. Thereafter, he moved to Somerset, and joined H.S.W. Stone in the Taunton architectural practice of Stone and Lloyd, later known as Stone and Partners. Among the houses he built in Somerset was his own, Long Meadow at West Monkton, started in 1929. He was later responsible for much restoration work, and for the design of the Roman Catholic Church of St Teresa of Lisieux in Taunton, his only church building. Completed in 1959, the church is described as "airy, light and beautiful, fitting happily into the modern housing around it".

Francis was an accomplished hockey player, participating in the Wales international game against Ireland in 1920. He became a Fellow of the Royal Institute of British Architects in 1923. He was also a member of the Society of Antiquaries. He died in West Monkton, Somerset, in 1976 at the age of 88.

== Gallery ==
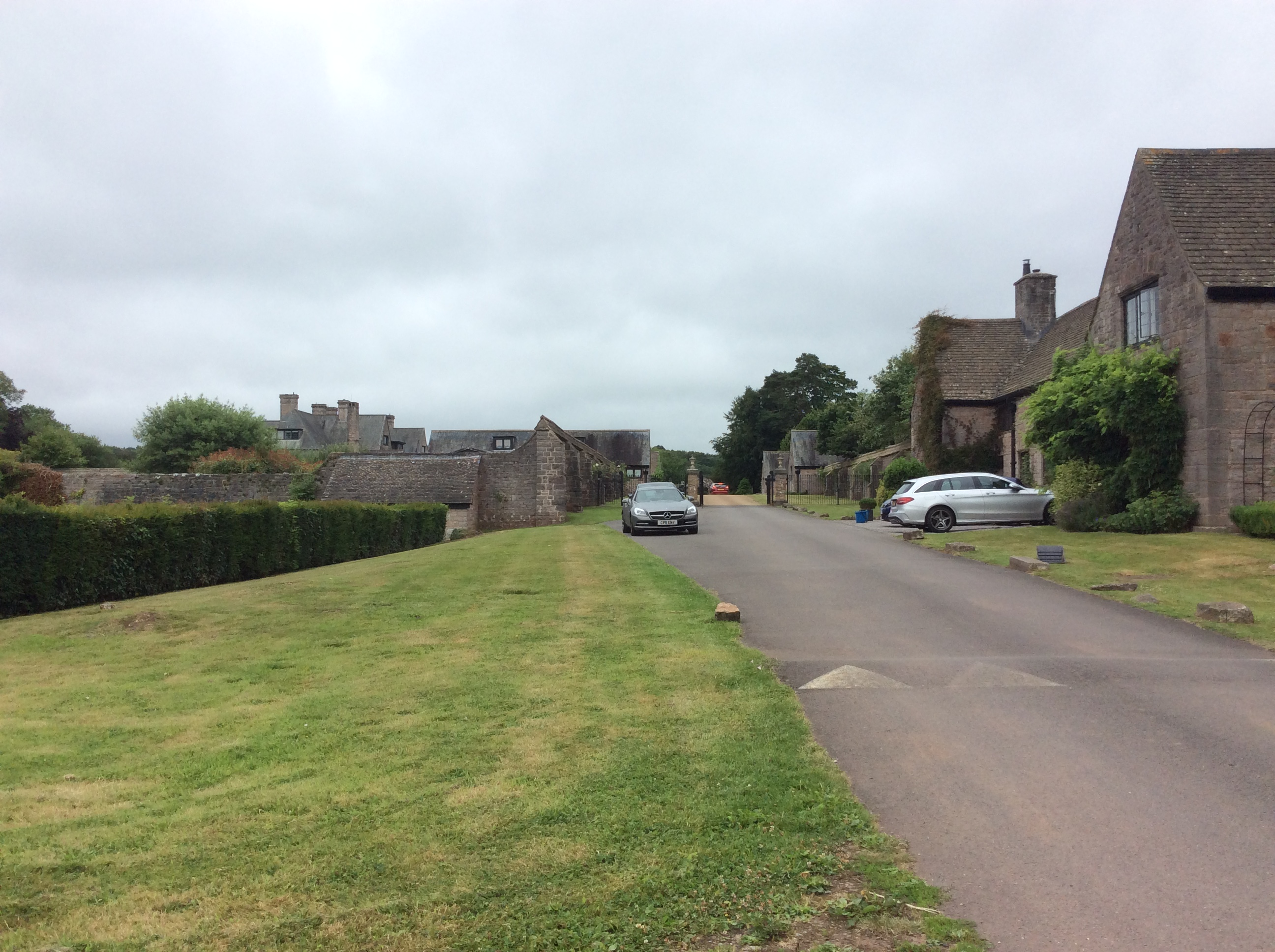
Mounton House 1910-12

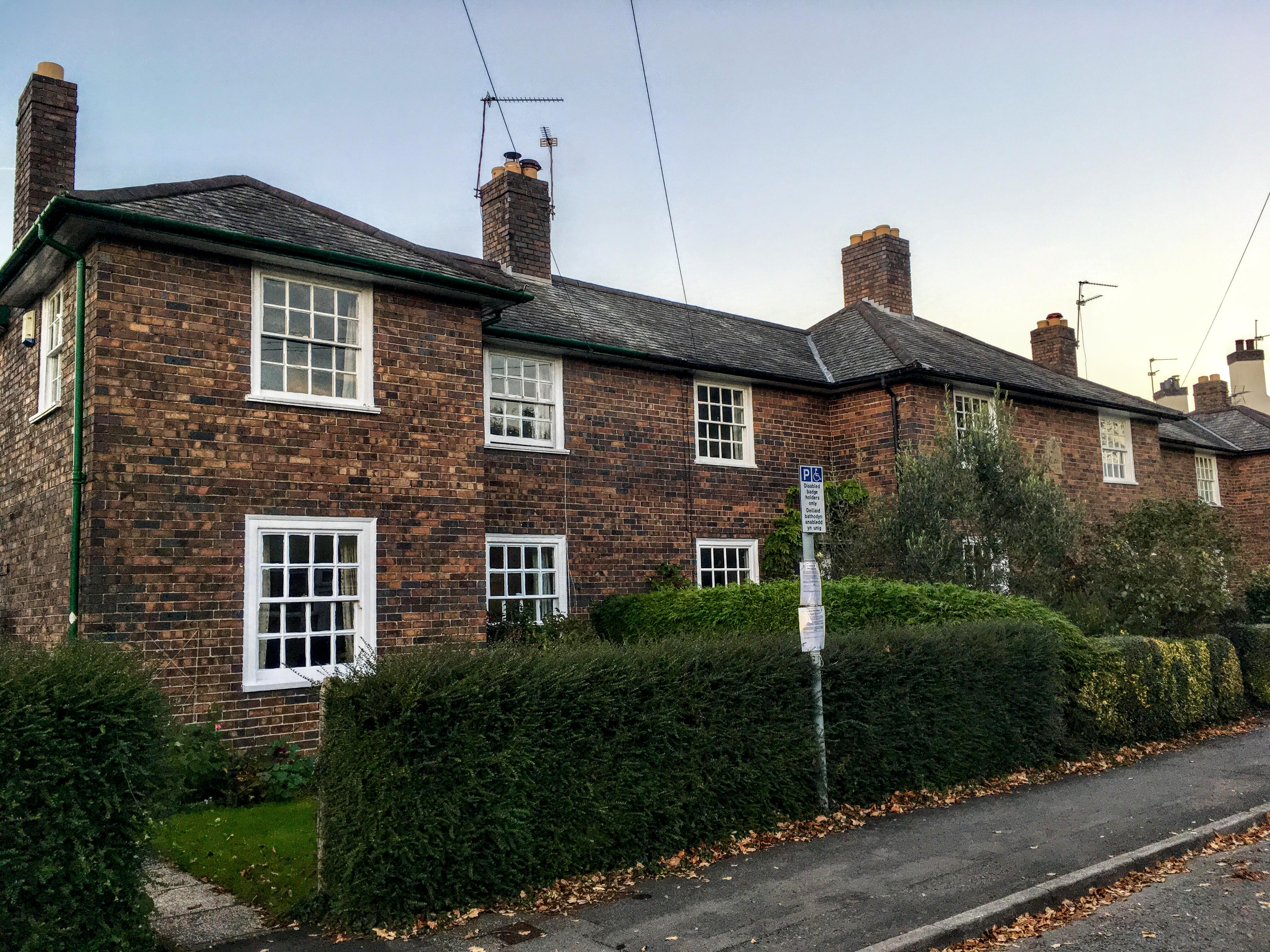
Pen-y-dre, Rhiwbina Garden Village c.1912

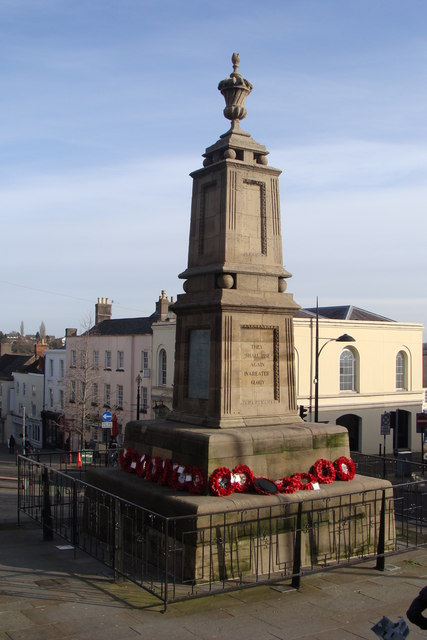
Chepstow War Memorial 1921-22

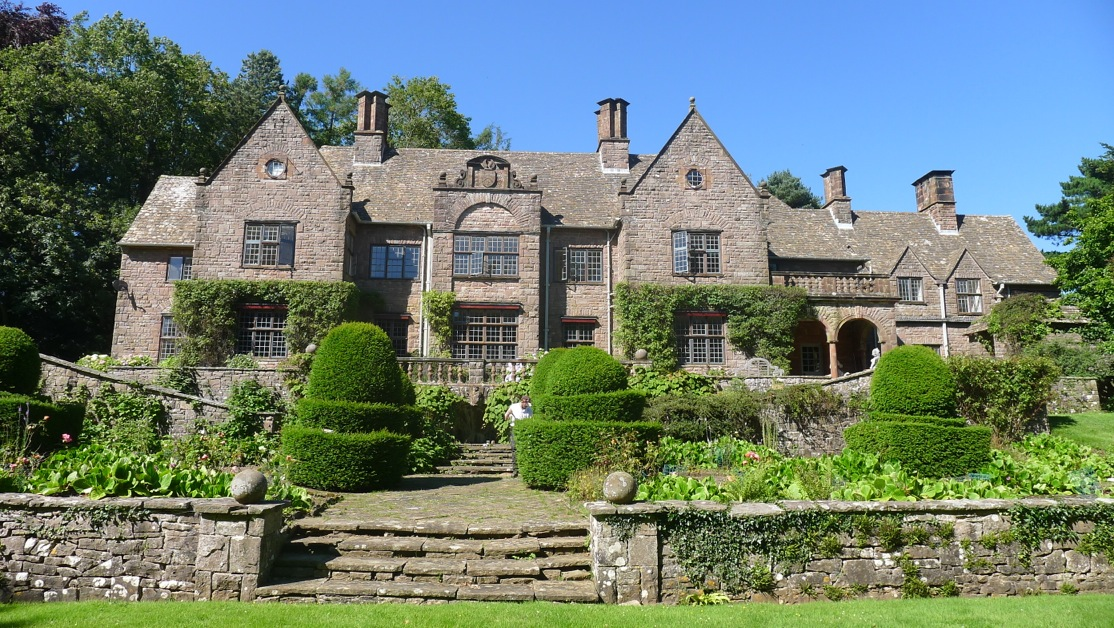
Wyndcliffe Court 1922

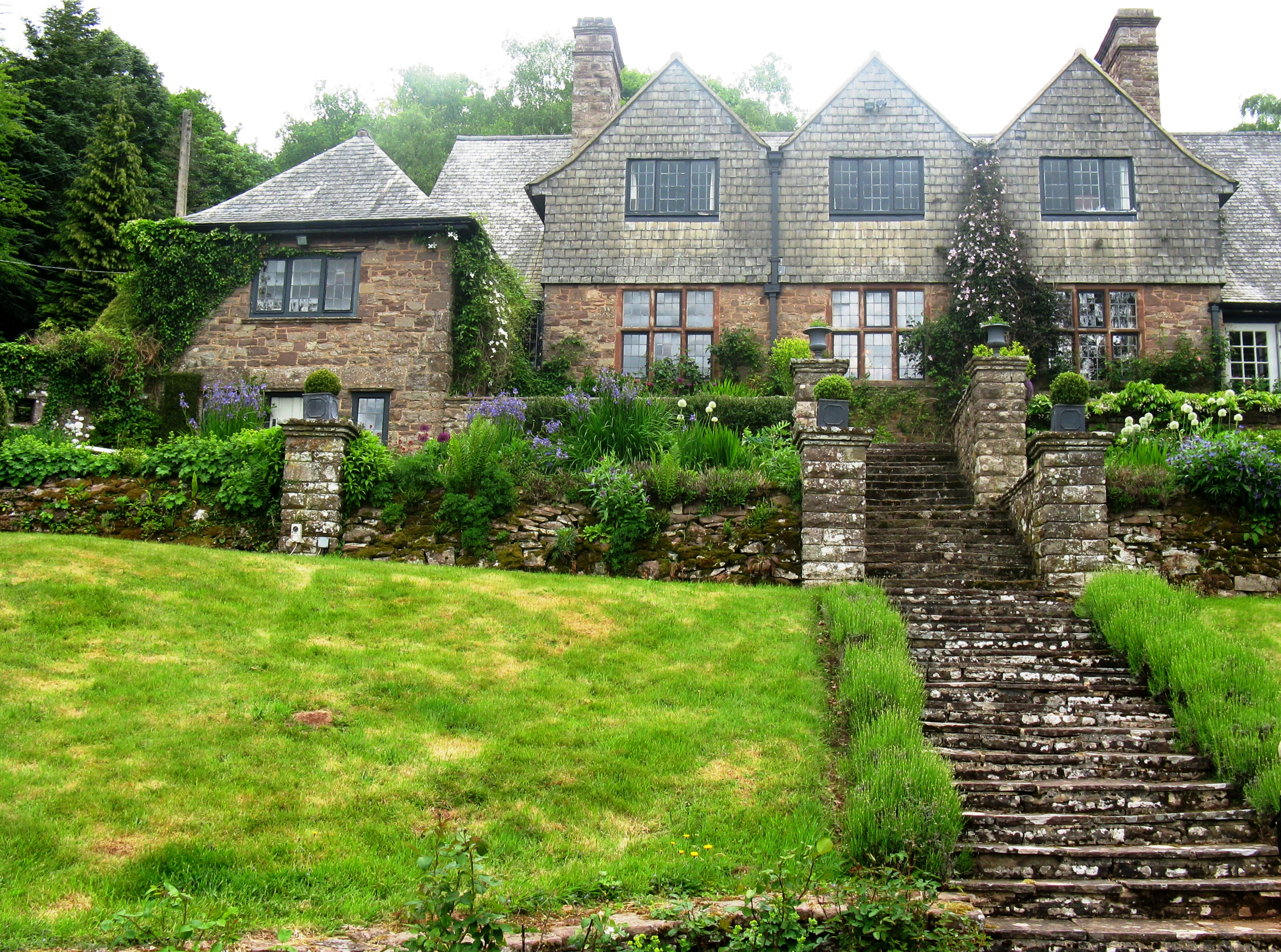
High Glanau 1922-23

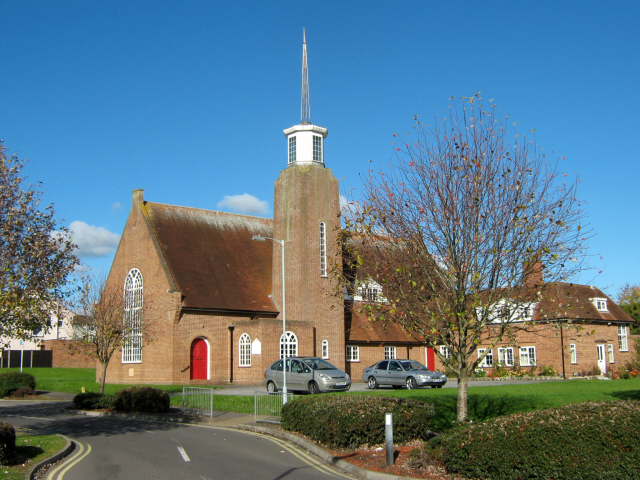
Church of St Teresa of Lisieux 1958-59
