= Chepstow War Memorial =

War memorial in Chepstow, Monmouthshire, Wales

- Wales
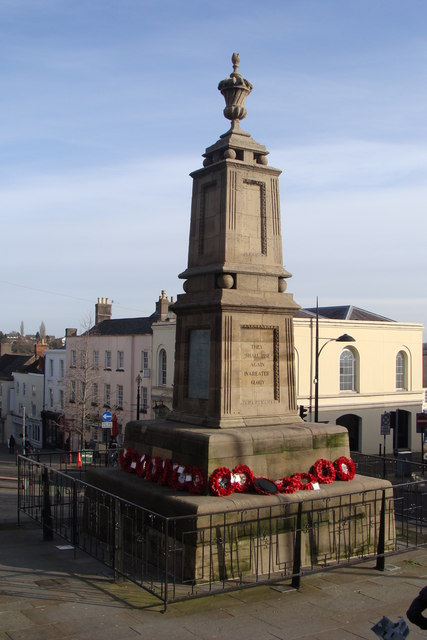
- For men from the town of Chepstow who died in the First and Second World Wars
- Unveiled: 1922
- Location: 51.642°N 2.6751°W; Chepstow, Monmouthshire, Wales
- Designed by: Eric Francis
- THEY/ SHALL RISE/ AGAIN/ IN GREATER/ GLORY

Listed Building – Grade II
- Official name: Chepstow War Memorial
- Designated: 24 March 1975
- Reference no.: 2503

Chepstow War Memorial, in Beaufort Square, Chepstow, Wales, commemorates the men of the town who died in the First and Second World Wars. It was designed by Eric Francis, a locally-born architect. The memorial's Neoclassical design is uncommon. The memorial site also includes a German Naval deck gun, donated to the town by George V in commemoration of the posthumous award of a Victoria Cross to Able Seaman William Charles Williams, who grew up in Chepstow and was killed at Gallipoli. Chepstow War Memorial was designated a Grade II listed structure in 1975.

== Background ==
The loss of life during the First World War brought about a national response through the construction of an unprecedented number of war memorials to commemorate the dead. Within Wales, which saw the loss of some 35,000 soldiers, memorials were established in many towns and cities during the 1920s.

== Description ==
Chepstow's memorial was designed by Eric Francis, the son of a Chepstow solicitor, who trained under Guy Dawber and Detmar Blow. It comprises a two-stage stone column, topped by a stone urn, all resting on a stone plinth with two deep steps. Each of the two stages has sunken panels on all four sides, and a cornice above which has stone orbs at the corners. The design is Neoclassical, an uncommon style for war memorials of this age and type. John Newman, in his Monmouthshire volume of The Buildings of Wales, describes the memorial as "the pivotal feature of Beaufort Square" and notes its "eighteenth century idiom". On the lower stage of the column, the sunken panel on the southwest face carries an inscription, "THEY / SHALL RISE / AGAIN / IN GREATER / GLORY", while the other three faces have metal plaques recording the names of the dead, two with those who died in the First World War, and one with those who died in the Second. The northeast side of the plinth bears the inscription "Their name liveth for evermore".

The memorial is now enclosed with a set of railings constructed in the 1980s by members of the Army Apprentices College based at Beachley Barracks.

Beside the stone column, a deck gun from the German U-boat, SM UB-91, forms part of the memorial. The gun was donated to the town by George V, in recognition of the Victoria Cross awarded to Able Seaman William Charles Williams, who had lived in Chepstow. (Note: William Charles Williams (1880–1915) was born near Ludlow but subsequently lived in Chepstow. Enlisting in the Royal Navy in 1895, he was killed on 25 April 1915 during the landing at Cape Helles during the Gallipoli campaign and was posthumously awarded the Victoria Cross.)

== Reception ==
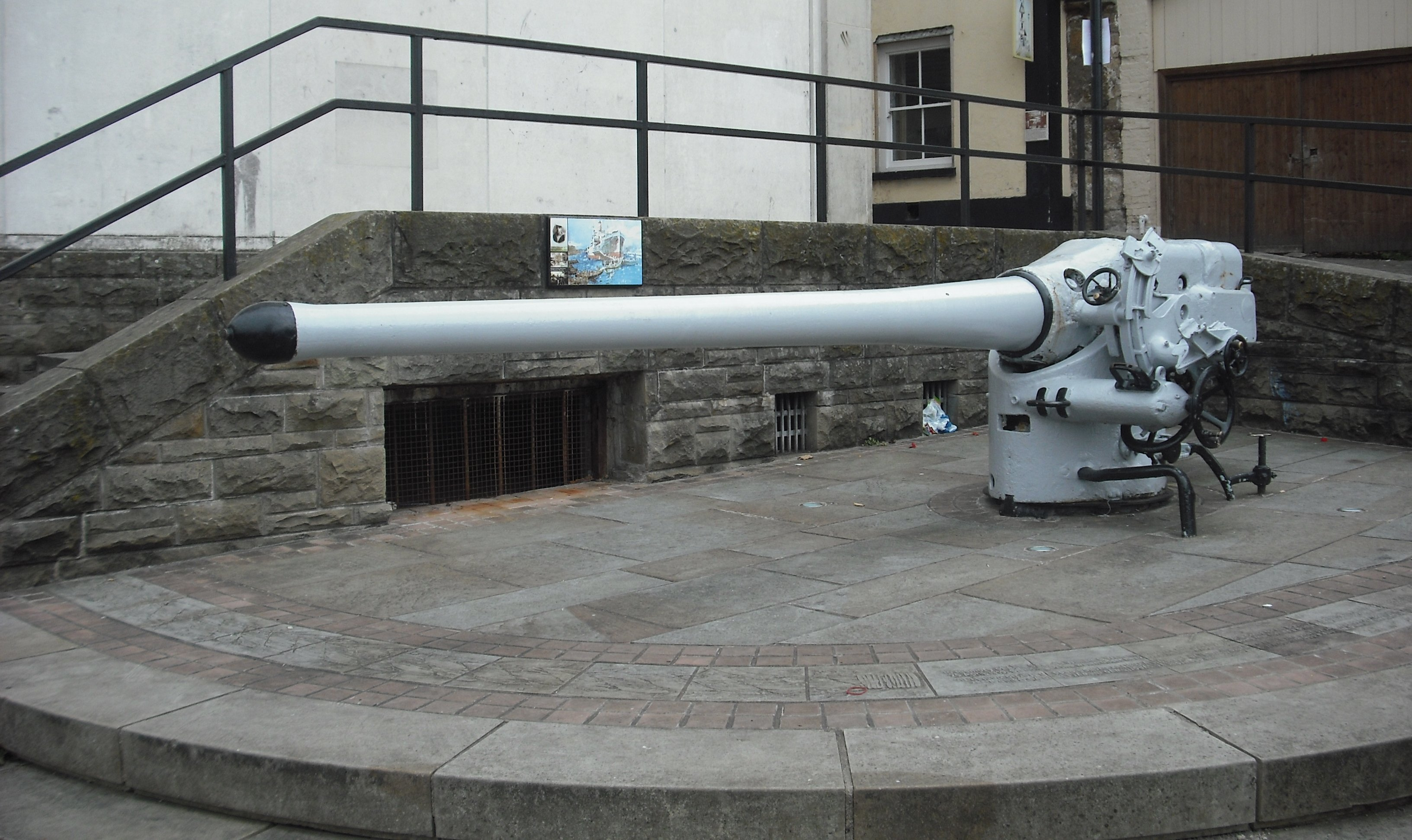
The 10.5 cm deck gun of SM UB-91 is installed beside the war memorial in Chepstow

The memorial was installed in the centre of Chepstow, on a platform level with Bank Street and raised by a flight of steps above High Street. It was unveiled on 8 January 1922, in a ceremony presided over by Lieutenant Colonel Charles Ariel Evill DSO, a local solicitor who commanded the 1/1st Monmouthshire Regiment in France. The deck gun was unveiled at the same ceremony by Williams' sister, Mrs Frances Smith, who was accompanied by Captain Edward Unwin VC. (Note: Edward Unwin (1864–1950) served alongside Able Seaman Williams on HMS River Clyde, and was another of the six naval personnel who were awarded Victoria Cross for the same action at Cape Helles on 25 April 1915.)

Deterioration in the condition of the naval gun generated adverse press comment at the time of the centenary celebrations of the end of the First World War in 2018. Restoration of the gun was subsequently undertaken. The War Memorials Trust considers the general condition of the Chepstow Memorial to be "good". The memorial is a Grade II listed structure.

== Sources ==
- Chepstow Society (November 2014). "Chepstow in the Great War: 1914–1918" (PDF).
- Gerrish, Helena (2011). Edwardian Country Life: The Story of Henry Avray Tipping. London: Frances Lincoln. ISBN 978-0-7112-3223-5. OCLC 765305877.
- Newman, John (2000). Gwent/Monmouthshire. The Buildings of Wales. Penguin. ISBN 0-14-071053-1.
