= Mounton =

Coordinates: 51.6361°N 2.7036°W

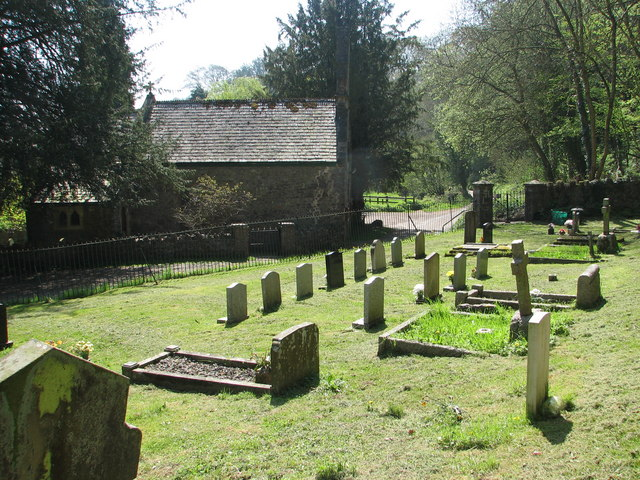
- St Andoenus's Church

- Location within Monmouthshire
- OS grid reference: ST513930
- Principal area: Monmouthshire
- Preserved county: Gwent
- Country: Wales
- Sovereign state: United Kingdom
- Post town: CHEPSTOW
- Postcode district: NP16
- Dialling code: 01291
- Police: Gwent
- Fire: South Wales
- Ambulance: Welsh
- UK Parliament: Monmouth

Mounton is a hamlet in Monmouthshire, south east Wales, United Kingdom, located 2 miles (3.2 km) west of Chepstow in a rural setting.

The parish was originally part of the holdings of Chepstow Priory, with the name Monktown. It has a tiny parish church dedicated to Saint Andoenus, which was almost wholly rebuilt in 1880 and which lies in the Parish of Mathern and Mounton with St Pierre. It is part of the Severn Wye Ministry Area. The church has stained glass windows by James Powell and Sons and Clayton and Bell. One of the gravestones, to a Christopher Cooper, is dated 8 April 1680. It is believed that the current structure was built on the site of a monastic cell, from the Middle Ages.

Until the late 19th century the village had three water mills, producing paper, carpets and cloth. These were called Lady Mill, Lark Mill and Linnet Mill. The last owner, John Birt, closed the mills down in 1876 after being accused of polluting Mounton Brook. According to Fred Hando one of the mills produced the paper used for Bank of England notes, but a monograph by the local historian Ivor Waters states that they "rarely made anything but brown and blue packing paper", using old rags, rope and straw as raw materials.

Mounton House, now a special school for boys, was built as a country house in the Arts and Crafts style in 1914 by Henry Avray Tipping, a leading garden designer and writer, assisted by the local architect Eric Francis.

Robin Williams, coach to Great Britain's 2012 Olympic women's pairs rowing champions Helen Glover and Heather Stanning, is from Mounton. He learnt to row at Monmouth School and went on to win world silver and bronze medals and coached Cambridge to seven Boat Race wins. His GB pair won world gold in a new world record at the world championships in Amsterdam in August 2014.

Mounton is located on the Mounton Brook, which is 15 km (9 mi) long.
