= Abergavenny Priory Deer Park =

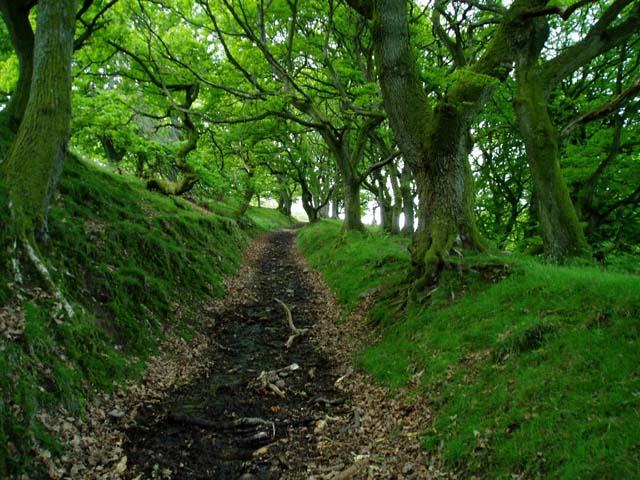
- A stretch of the park boundary

- Location within Monmouthshire
- 51.85404°N 3.040349°W
- Type: Deer park
- Location: Abergavenny, Monmouthshire

History
- Built: Mediaeval

Cadw/ICOMOS Register of Parks and Gardens of Special Historic Interest in Wales
- Official name: Abergavenny Priory Deer Park
- Designated: 1 February 2022
- Reference no.: PGW(Gt)55(MON)
- Listing: Grade II

Listed Building – Grade II
- Official name: Park Lodge Farmhouse
- Designated: 10 November 2005
- Reference no.: 86798

Abergavenny Priory Deer Park, to the north of the town of Abergavenny in Monmouthshire, Wales, was a mediaeval deer park. Today, the site is listed on the Cadw/ICOMOS Register of Parks and Gardens of Special Historic Interest in Wales.

== History and description ==
Abergavenny Priory was founded by Hamelin de Ballon (c.1060-c.1105). A Norman knight, de Ballon is believed to have arrived in England with William II and to have established the priory in around 1100. The date of the establishment of the deer park is not known. Such monastic parks were not uncommon; at the height of their power, monasteries, abbeys and priories were wealthy institutions, with substantial lodgings, even palaces, as official residences for the foundation's leaders, granges and farms to supply them, and opportunities for leisure and entertaining, such as parks for hunting.

Park Lodge Farmhouse, which stands in the middle of the park, is traditionally held to have been the home of the park's ranger. It is a Grade II listed building. John Newman, in his Gwent / Monmouthshire volume of the Pevsner Buildings of Wales, considers the farmhouse and its barns, "a delightful textbook group".

The deer park at Abergavenny is around 550 acres in extent and stands in the lee of the Sugar Loaf hill to the north of the town. Substantial elements of its boundary walls, comprising deep ditches, earthen banks and some stone walling survive. In 2022, it was listed on the Cadw/ICOMOS Register of Parks and Gardens of Special Historic Interest in Wales.

The deer park is publicly accessible via a range of footpaths.

== Sources ==
- Newman, John (2000). Gwent/Monmouthshire. The Buildings of Wales. Penguin. ISBN 0-14-071053-1.
