= Wyndcliffe Court =

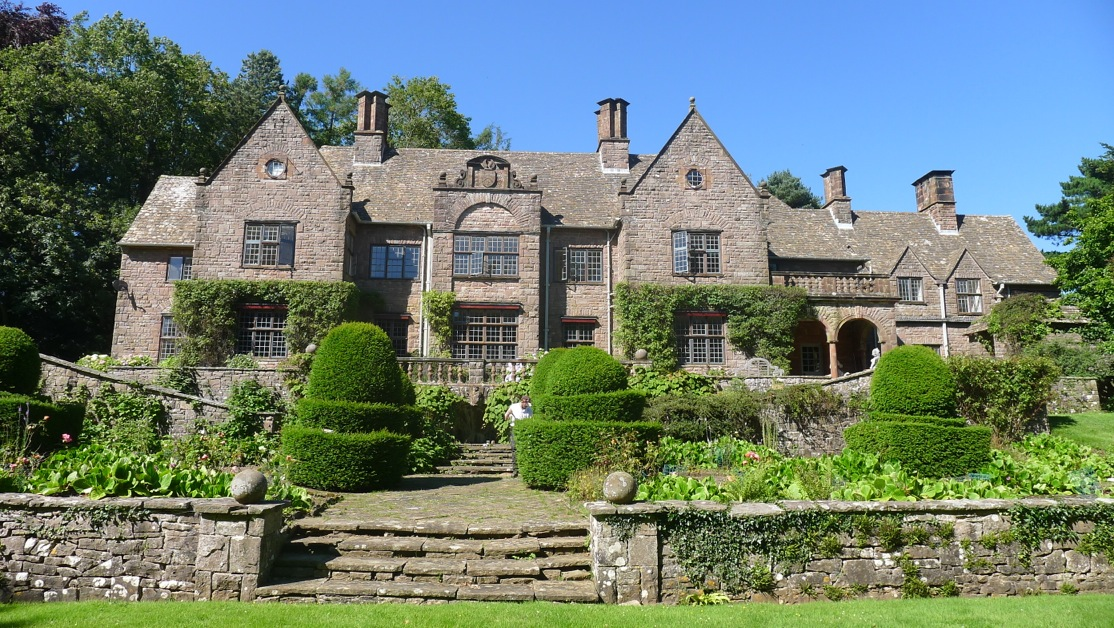
- "a good and unaltered Jacobean style house"

- Location within Monmouthshire
- 51.6719°N 2.6984°W
- Type: House
- Location: St. Arvans, Monmouthshire

History
- Built: 1922
- Built for: Charles Leigh Clay

Site notes
- Architect: Eric Francis
- Architectural style: Arts and Crafts
- Governing body: Privately owned

Listed Building – Grade II*
- Official name: Wyndcliffe Court
- Designated: 29 January 1998
- Reference no.: 1931

Listed Building – Grade II*
- Official name: Garage cottages at Wyndcliffe Court
- Designated: 14 February 2001
- Reference no.: 24773 & 24776

Listed Building – Grade II*
- Official name: Garden terracing, steps, pool, pergola and summerhouse at Wyndcliffe Court
- Designated: 14 February 2001
- Reference no.: 24764

Cadw/ICOMOS Register of Parks and Gardens of Special Historic Interest in Wales
- Official name: Wyndcliffe Court
- Designated: 1 February 2022
- Reference no.: PGW(Gt)4(Mon)
- Listing: Grade II

Wyndcliffe Court, 0.5 miles (0.8 km) north of the village of St. Arvans, Monmouthshire, Wales, is a Grade II* listed country house and gardens in the Arts and Crafts style, completed in 1922. The client was Charles Leigh Clay and the architect Eric Francis. The gardens were designed by Henry Avray Tipping and are included on the Cadw/ICOMOS Register of Parks and Gardens of Special Historic Interest in Wales.

== History ==
Charles Leigh Clay (1866–1950) was the founder of the Claymore shipping company based in Cardiff, and the son of Henry Clay (1825–1921), who owned Piercefield House overlooking the Wye valley. In 1910, Charles Leigh Clay commissioned a house on the high ground to the north of St Arvans village, about 1 mile (1.6 km) west of the Wyndcliff landscape feature. He later became High Sheriff of Monmouthshire in 1926. His son, Henry Anthony Patrick Clay ERD, who continued to live at Wyndcliffe Court until his death in 2006, also became High Sheriff of Monmouthshire in 1965.

The house was commissioned after the first world war and built in 1922. The architect was Eric Carwardine Francis, a local architect who had previously worked on the design of Mounton House for its owner Henry Avray Tipping, the Architectural Editor of Country Life magazine.

In the early 21st century, the court was let, and the gardens were opened to the public on a regular basis during the summer to showcase exhibitions of garden sculpture. The shows have exhibited the work of many prominent British sculptors. Regular events were also held throughout the summer, such as Shakespeare performances in the garden. The tenants announced in July 2016 that the gardens would close at the end of September. The Clays returned to the house and, in 2018, lost a case at the High Court regarding the re-roofing of the building. In January 2019, Wyndcliffe featured in a BBC Two series, The Victorian House of Arts and Crafts, in which a group of craftspeople collaborate on refurbishing parts of the house.

== Architecture and description ==
The house is built of local stone in the "Cotswold Tudor" style, with mullion and transom windows. The architectural historian John Newman describes it as "relaxed and sophisticated". The oak-lined ballroom, called the Oak Room, has Jacobethan-style paneling and one of the most extravagant plasterwork ceilings of its period anywhere in the country, depicting hops and roses, combining the early brewery roots of the Clay family with the Yorkshire rose of Mrs Clay. The plaster work was undertaken by Kebles. The gardens were designed by Tipping in the Italianate Arts and Crafts Style. A paved terrace has steps down to a small pool and a summerhouse, linking the different levels on the steeply sloping site. The gardens also feature sculpted topiary, a sunken garden, walled gardens, fountains, an archery lawn and wooded walks, and remain substantially unaltered since Tipping created them. Tipping was influenced in the design of the garden at Wyndcliffe by the work of his friend Gertrude Jekyll, who was designing gardens of hardy plants contained within sequences of outdoor "rooms". All are planted with flowers in bedding schemes. The yew hedge topiary with the stone walls and terraces give structure to the garden.

The house was given Grade II* listed building status on 14 February 2001, its listing describing it as "a good and unaltered Jacobean style house (with) an unaltered contemporary garden". The two sets of garages, with accompanying cottages, and the garden terraces, the steps, the pool, pergola and summerhouse all have their own Grade II* listings. The gardens themselves are listed at Grade II* on the Cadw/ICOMOS Register of Parks and Gardens of Special Historic Interest in Wales.

== Gallery ==
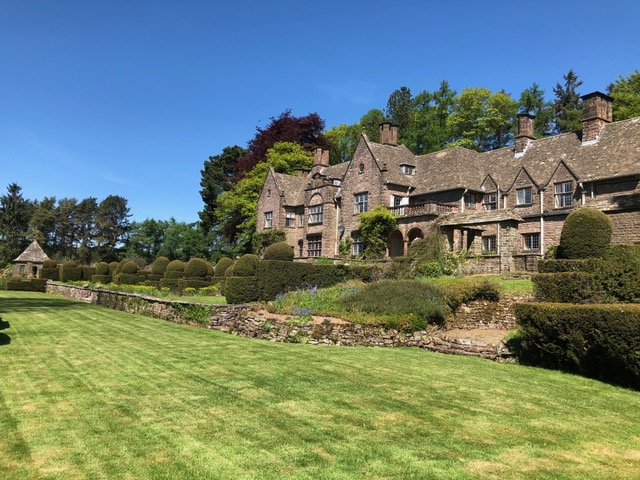
The house from the lawn

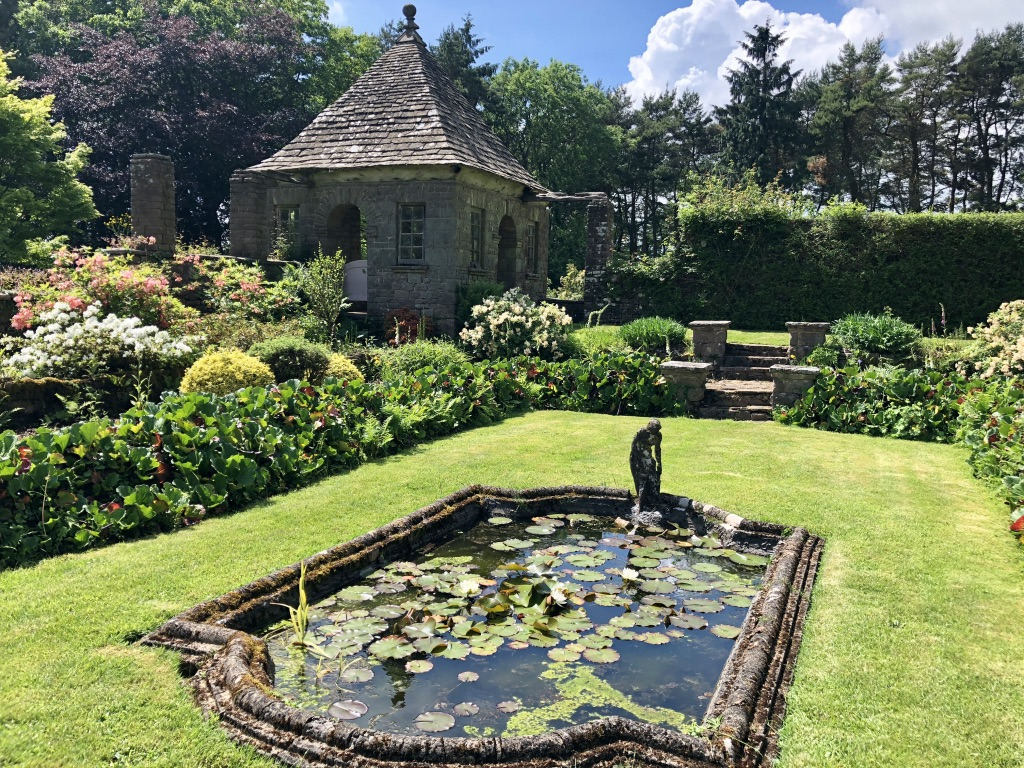
Sunken pond

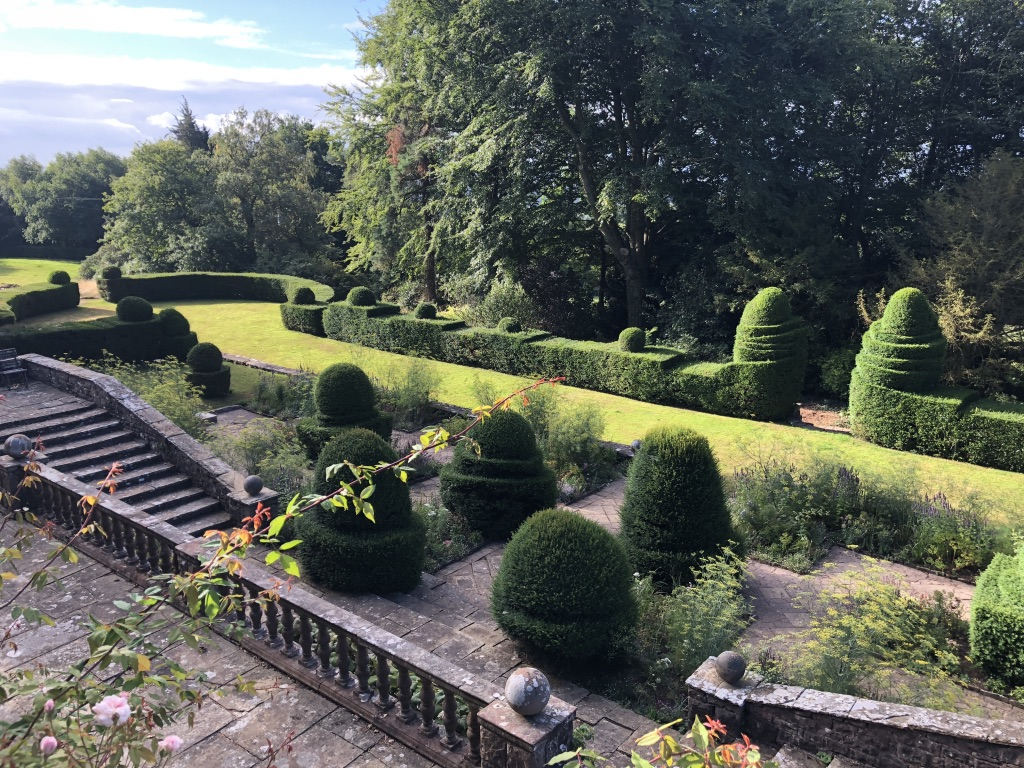
Topiary garden and archery lawn

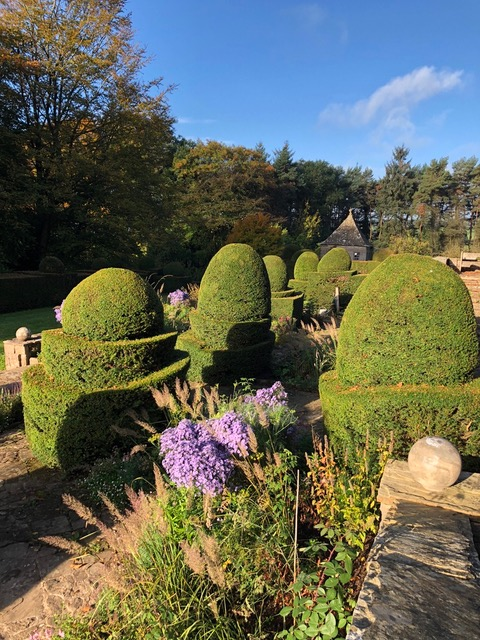
Topiary

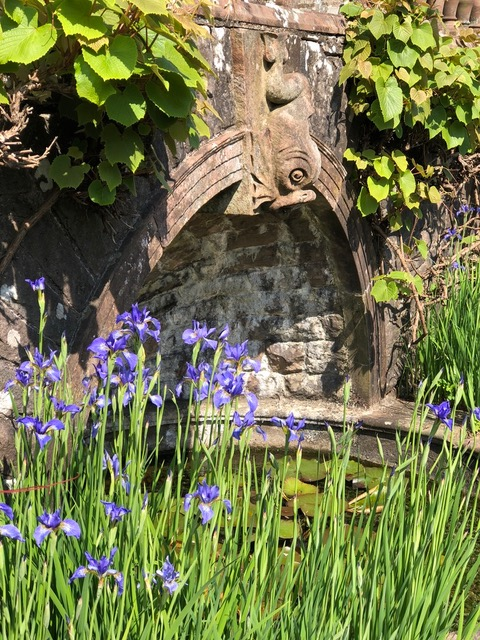
Lily pond with dolphin below the terrace

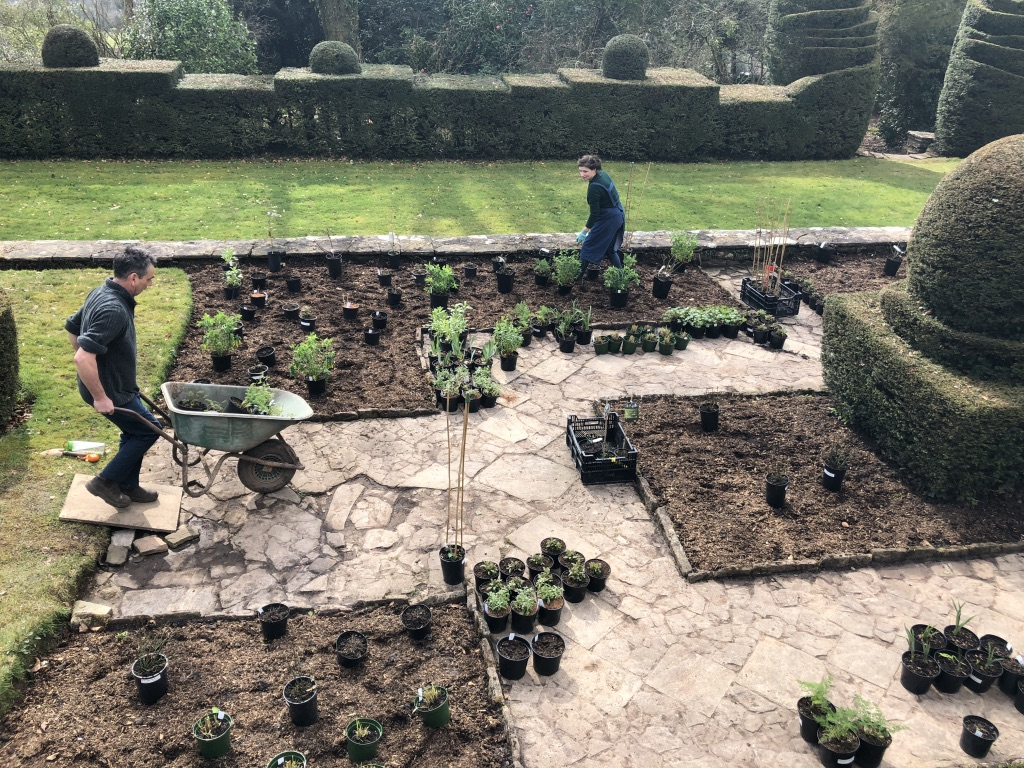
Restoration work in Spring 2018
