= Mounton House =

Country house in Wales, built 1910-12

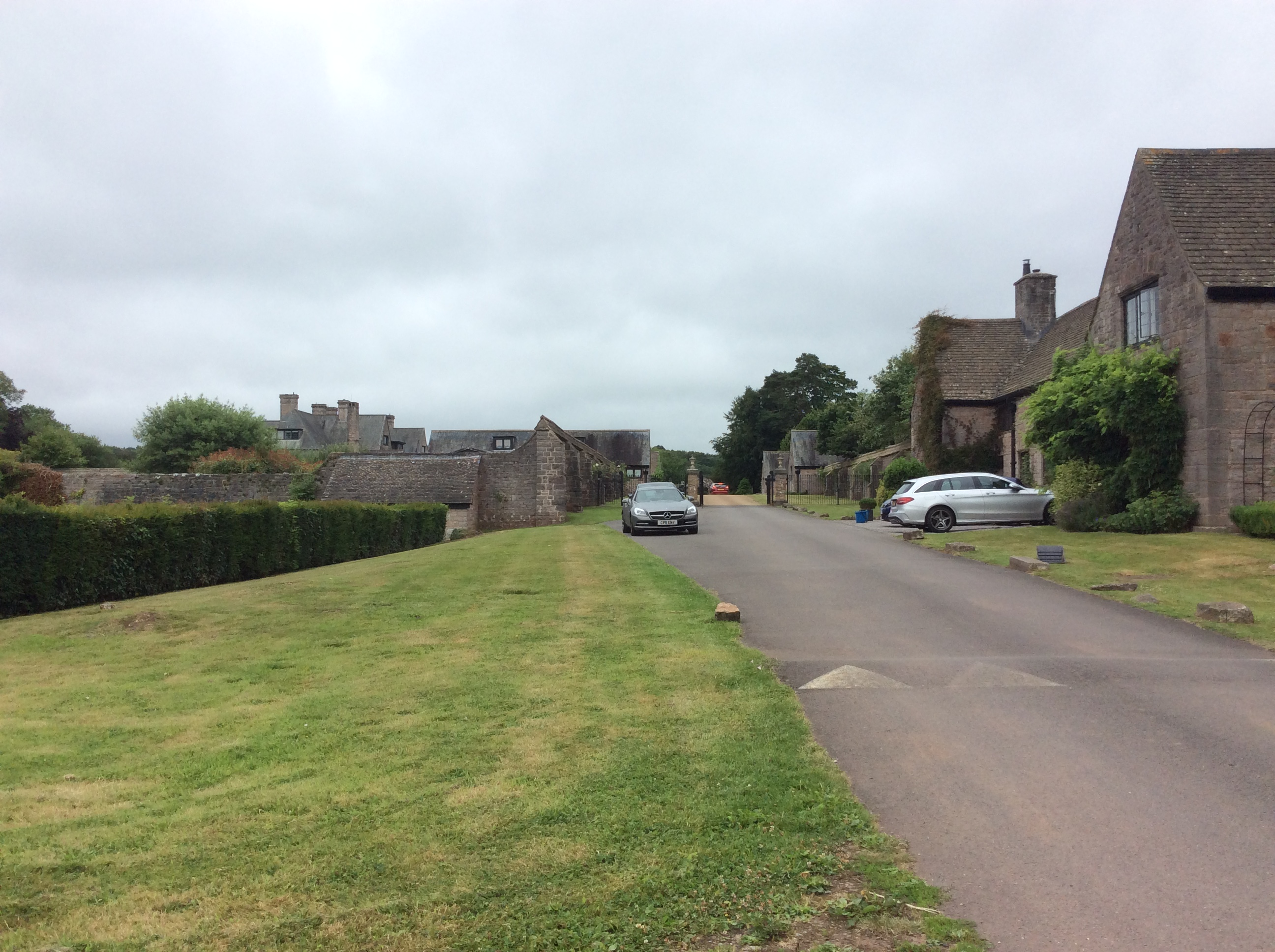
- The roofs of the house to the left, the gardeners' cottages to the right

- Location within Monmouthshire
- 51.6361°N 2.7036°W
- Type: House
- Location: Mounton, Monmouthshire

History
- Built: 1910-12

Site notes
- Architect(s): Henry Avray Tipping & Eric Francis
- Architectural style: Arts and Crafts
- Governing body: Privately owned

Listed Building – Grade II*
- Official name: Mounton House
- Designated: 10 October 2000
- Reference no.: 24061

Cadw/ICOMOS Register of Parks and Gardens of Special Historic Interest in Wales
- Official name: Mounton House
- Designated: 1 February 2022
- Reference no.: PGW(Gt)8(Mon)
- Listing: Grade II*

Mounton House, Mounton, Monmouthshire, Wales, is the last major country house built in the county, constructed between 1910 and 1912 by the architect and writer Henry Avray Tipping for himself. Formerly a school, which has now relocated to the grounds, the house has been divided into apartments. It is a Grade II* listed building. The surrounding park is on the Cadw/ICOMOS Register of Parks and Gardens of Special Historic Interest in Wales.

== History ==
Henry Avray Tipping was a garden designer and architectural writer of independent means. Tipping had earlier lived and worked at Mathern Palace in the late 1890s and in 1910 began the construction of his home at Mounton, on the site of a cliff-top garden he had previously designed. Tipping worked with the Chepstow architect Eric Francis to create a large house in the Arts and Crafts style using local materials. Tipping lived at the house from its completion until 1922, when he moved to another Monmouthshire house and garden of his own design, High Glanau. The house then became the site of a special school until the end of the 20th century. The house and the estate buildings have now been converted to private homes and apartments. The gardens were restored in the 2020s by the landscape architect Arne Maynard. They are listed at Grade II* on the Cadw/ICOMOS Register of Parks and Gardens of Special Historic Interest in Wales.

== Description ==
The house is two-storeyed, with a large hipped roof. The main building forms the central block of a three-sided courtyard, with a service court to the left and a long gallery to the right. The house is a Grade II* listed building. A large number of the estate structures have their own Grade II listings including, the North and Vine pergolas, the North and South urns on the bowling green, the tea house, the courtyard buildings, the garden walls and three gardeners' cottages.
