= Henry Avray Tipping =

French-born British writer on country houses and garden designer

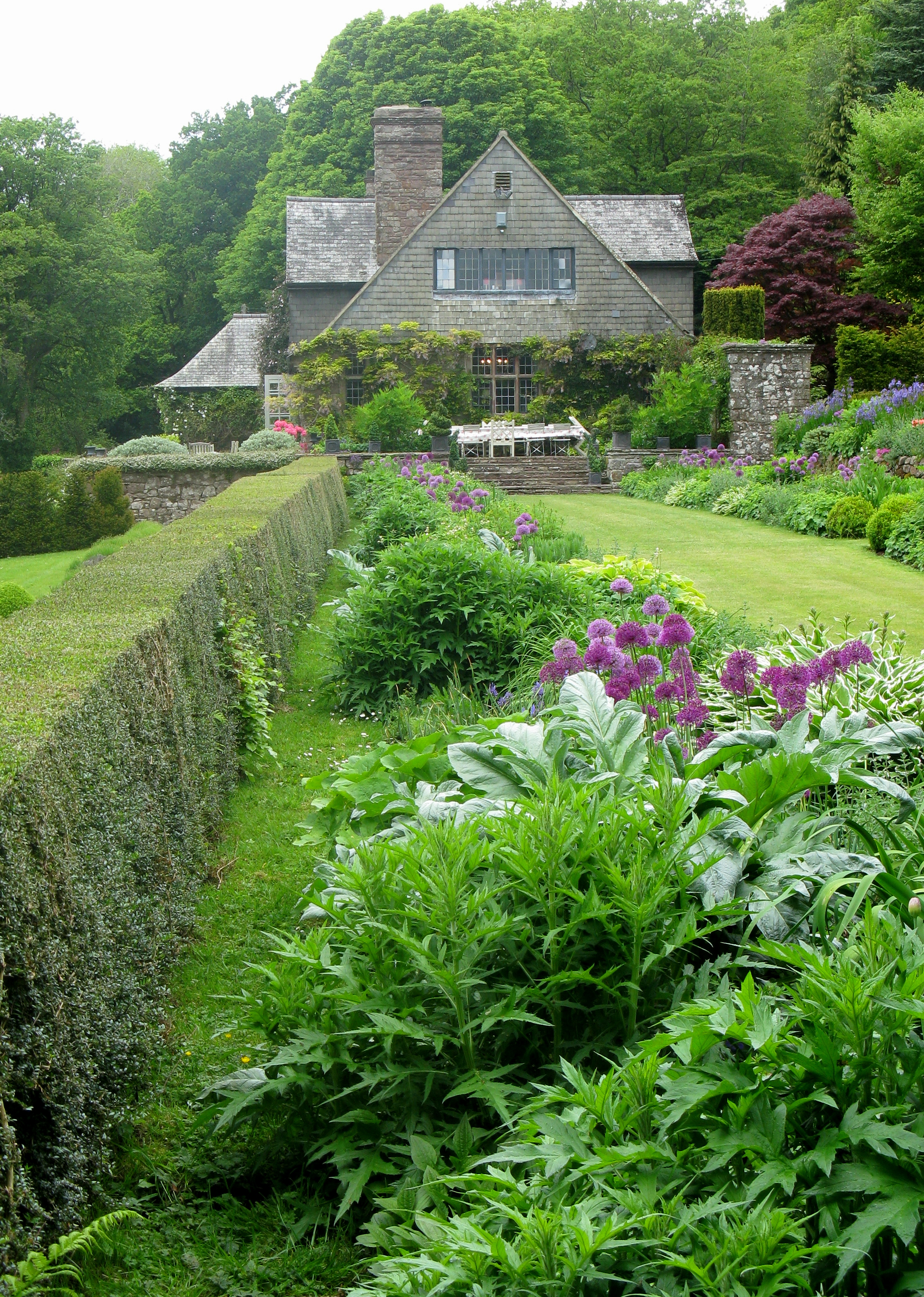
- Tipping's house and garden at High Glanau, near Monmouth
- Born: 22 August 1855; Ville-d'Avray near Versailles, France
- Died: 16 November 1933 (aged 78); Harefield, Middlesex, England
- Known for: Writer, garden designer, architectural editor of Country Life

Henry Avray Tipping FSA (22 August 1855 – 16 November 1933) was a French-born British writer on country houses and gardens, a garden designer, and Architectural Editor of Country Life magazine for 17 years.

== Early life ==
Tipping was born in the Château de Ville-d'Avray near Versailles, while his parents were living in France before moving into Brasted Place in Brasted, Kent, where he grew up. He belonged to a Quaker Christian family of businessmen, who had prospered in the corn trade in Liverpool. His father, William Tipping (1816–1897), was a railway company owner and amateur archaeologist and artist, who served as the Conservative Member of Parliament for Stockport between 1868–74 and 1885–86. His mother Maria (née Walker, 1822–1911) was the daughter of a flax mill owner from Leeds.

Henry Avray Tipping was educated in France and Middlesex before reading modern history at Christ Church, Oxford, where he was a member of the Oxford University Dramatic Society. He worked briefly as a university lecturer before joining the staff of the Dictionary of National Biography, where he concentrated on genealogical research. He also wrote musical comedies, performed locally in Kent, and became an expert on wood carving, particularly the work of Grinling Gibbons.

== Career ==
However, his main interest was gardening and garden design. In the 1880s, he lived at The Quarry, a house at Brasted (built on the Brasted Place estate for him as a bachelor house in 1874) where he designed his first garden. The house is built of ragstone from the former quarry in the grounds. The deep and rather damp quarry provided scope for creation of a fashionable fern garden with a series of ponds (fed by water from a rainwater cistern under the house), paths and bridges. Around the house extensive gardens were created including rose gardens, lawns and some specimen trees. 'Quarry', renamed 'Badgers' in 1971 and since extended, is built with an upstairs studio overlooking the grounds, to serve his needs as study for writing. Brasted Place survives and was eventually converted to apartments in the 1990s.

Tipping later moved to a cottage at Ramsbury in Wiltshire in 1890. He also began writing articles for The Garden, a magazine which had been founded by William Robinson in 1871; and between 1904 and 1909 he also edited the three-volume work In English Homes, a largely photographic survey of English domestic architecture. After The Garden became absorbed by Country Life in 1905, Tipping became one of Country Life's principal contributors.

In 1907 he was appointed as the magazine's Architectural Editor, and became recognised as one of the leading authorities on the history, architecture, furnishings and gardens of country houses in Britain. In 1910 Sir Lawrence Weaver became Architectural Editor, allowing Tipping time to write his books. However, in 1916 during the First World War, Weaver was appointed as a civil servant, with Tipping taking back the role of Architectural Editor, which he held until his retirement in 1930. Thereafter he continued as an architectural writer for the magazine until his death.

He also worked as a garden designer in the Arts and Crafts style; he was a friend of Gertrude Jekyll, Harold Peto and Edwin Lutyens. His gardens were characterised by divided compartments with sculpted yew hedging, topiary birds and animals, long grass bowling greens, lush planting and wild areas. His garden design works include the walled garden designed for Arthur Lee, its then owner, at Chequers, and several in his adopted county of Monmouthshire.

In 1894 he bought Mathern Palace, a ruined former bishops' palace near Chepstow, from George Carwardine Francis, a local solicitor who had purchased it from the Ecclesiastical Commissioners five years earlier. Tipping rebuilt the property; moved to live there with his mother; designed and, then laid out its surrounding gardens.

After inheriting a large fortune upon the deaths of both his brother and mother in 1911, he let (and later sold) Mathern Palace, and bought land at Mounton, again near Chepstow. The following year he commissioned from local architect Eric Francis – the son of George Carwardine Francis – an ambitious new house, Mounton House, above a small limestone gorge where Tipping designed his own formal gardens. He also planned the gardens at Wyndcliffe Court, St Arvans, near Chepstow, a new house designed by Francis for the Clay family who owned the Piercefield estate.

In 1922 Tipping bought land from the Duke of Beaufort near Trellech in Monmouthshire, and commissioned another new house, High Glanau Manor, also designed by Eric Francis. Again he took responsibility for its overall stylistic creation and that of its garden. Tipping gave away Mounton House to his brother's godson. In later life High Glanau became his country residence. Nevertheless, he still owned a smaller property, Harefield House at Harefield in Middlesex, which became his main residence in the final years before his death.

In 1927, he became a member of the first committee of the Gardens of England and Wales Scheme, later known as the National Gardens Scheme, and the following year helped organise an international exhibition of garden design for the Royal Horticultural Society. He also continued to write, both for Country Life and the Morning Post.

== Death ==
Before his death, Tipping instructed his friend and head gardener, Walter Wood, to whom he left most of his fortune, to destroy all his papers. Only a single year's diary survived. He died of cancer on 16 November 1933, at Harefield House, at the age of 78.

== Writings ==
His books included:

- Grinling Gibbons and the Woodwork of his Age (1914)
- The Story of the Royal Welch Fusiliers (1915)
- English Homes: architecture from Medieval times to the early part of the nineteenth century (1920–28)
- English Gardens (1925)
- Old English Furniture (1928)
- Tattershall Castle, Lincolnshire: A Historical & Descriptive Survey by the Late Marquis Curzon of Kedleston, K.G. and H. Avray Tipping, Curzon and H. Avray Tipping, 1929, Jonathan Cape, London, (Finished by Henry Avray Tipping after Curzon's death)
- The Garden of Today (1933)
