= Maerdy Farmhouse, Llanvihangel-Ystern-Llewern =

Maerdy Farmhouse
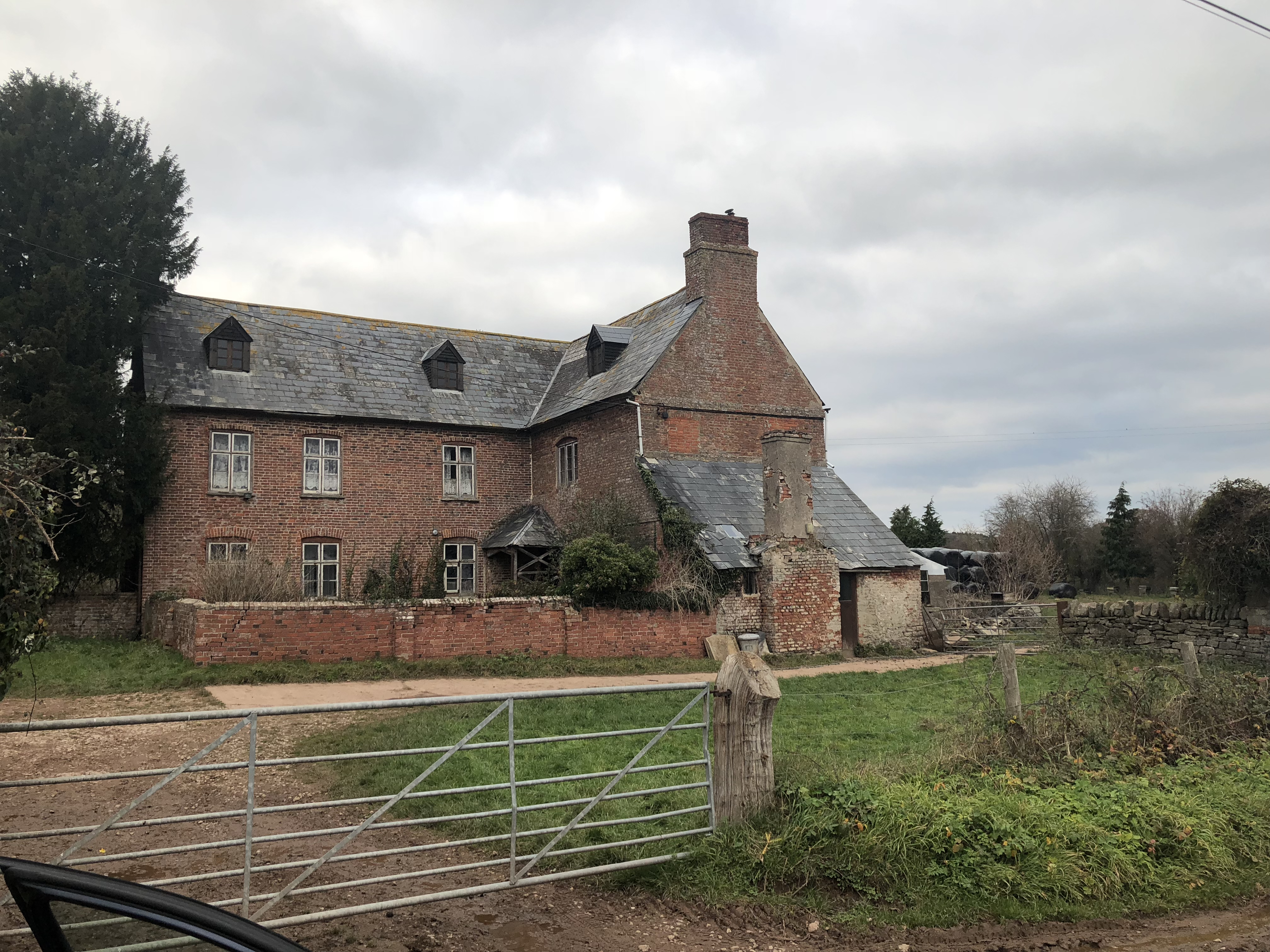
- "Red brick house of c.1700"

- Location within Monmouthshire
- 51.8309°N 2.8208°W
- Type: House
- Location: Llanvihangel-Ystern-Llewern, Monmouthshire

History
- Built: c1700

Site notes
- Architectural style: Vernacular
- Governing body: Privately owned

Listed Building – Grade II*
- Official name: Maerdy Farmhouse
- Designated: 27 October 2000
- Reference no.: 24311

Listed Building – Grade II
- Official name: Barn and Cider House at The Maerdy
- Designated: 27 October 2000
- Reference no.: 24312

Listed Building – Grade II
- Official name: Stable and Shelter Shed at The Maerdy
- Designated: 27 October 2000
- Reference no.: 24313

Maerdy Farmhouse (The Maerdy), Llanvihangel-Ystern-Llewern, Monmouthshire is a farmhouse dating from about 1700. Extended later in the 18th century, it is an early example of the use of brick, rather than stone, in Monmouthshire. The farmhouse is Grade II* listed with its stableblock and shelter shed, and its barn and cider house having their own Grade II listings.

== History ==
The farmhouse dates from the very late 17th century and is an early example for Monmouthshire of the use of brick, rather than stone, as a construction material. The first recorded owners are the Hughes family, a monument to John Hughes of the "Mardee", who died in 1792, being located in the Church of St Michael and All Angels, Llanvihangel-Ystern-Llewern. (Note: Joseph Bradney, in the Hundred of Skenfrith volume of his A History of Monmouthshire from the Coming of the Normans into Wales down to the Present Time, records that Thomas Hughes, one of Joseph Hughes' three sons, "obtained repute as Master of the Grammar School at Colwall in Herefordshire".) In the 19th century the farm was bought by John Etherington Welch Rolls, as part of his expansion of The Hendre estate at nearby Rockfield. Maerdy remains the privately owned farmhouse of an active farm. In July 2025 the farm was marketed for sale.

== Architecture and description ==
The architectural historian John Newman considers that Maerdy is the latest of the three houses of red brick constructed in the area around 1700, the others being The Pant and Upper Red House. The farmhouse is built on an L-plan, and is of two storeys with attics, and a roof of Welsh slate. It is Grade II* listed, Cadw recording it as "a fine Renaissance house, an early essay in the use of brick in the region". The stable block and shelter shed, and the cider house and barn, have separate Grade II listings.

== Sources ==
- Bradney, Joseph Alfred (1991) [1904]. The Hundred of Skenfrith. A History of Monmouthshire from the Coming of the Normans into Wales down to the Present Time. Vol. 1, Part 1. Academy Books. ISBN 978-1-873-36109-2. OCLC 59882270.
- Newman, John (2000). Gwent/Monmouthshire. The Buildings of Wales. London: Penguin. ISBN 0-14-071053-1.
