= Coldbrook Park =

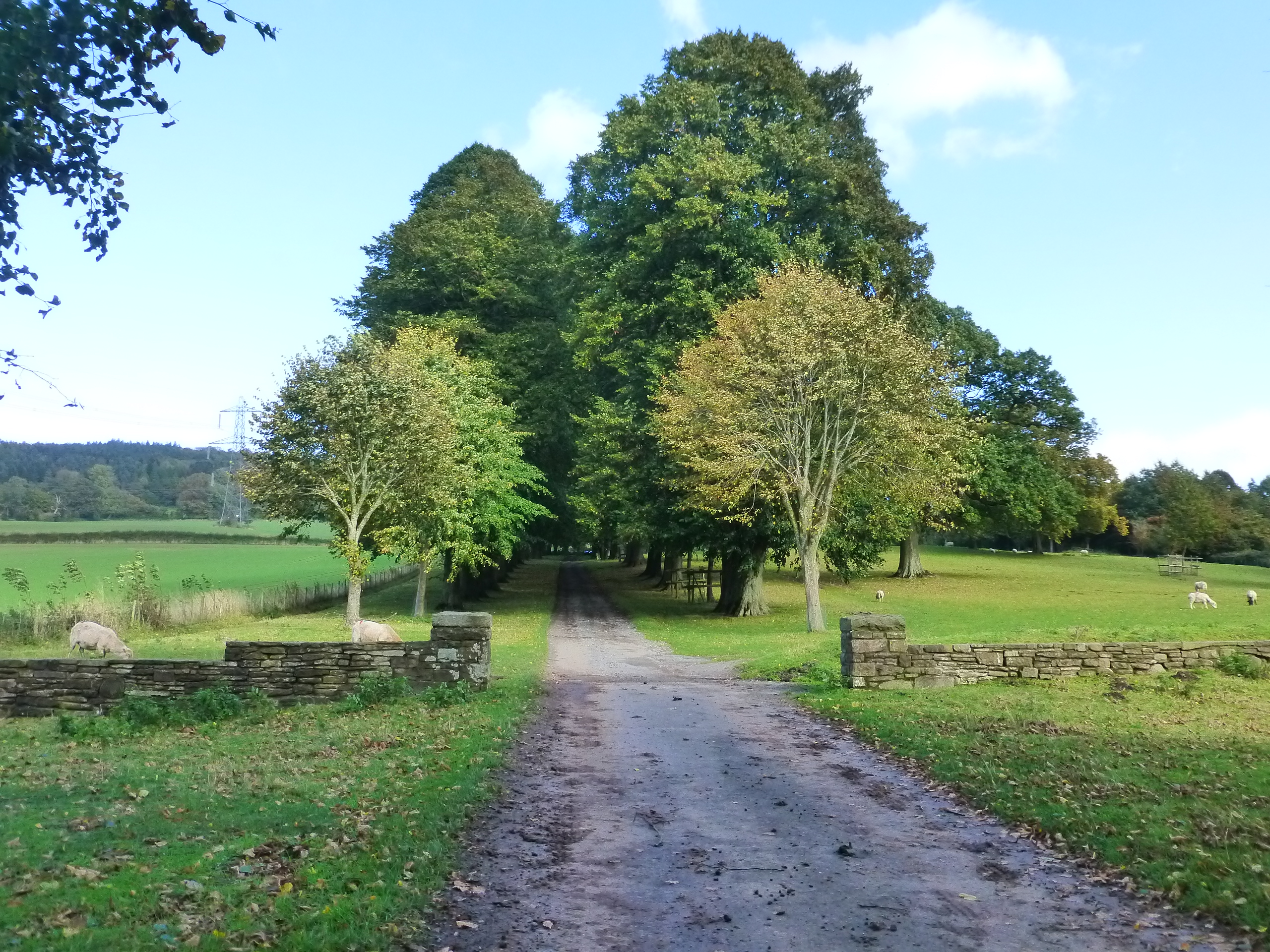
- The drive to the now-demolished house

- Location within Monmouthshire
- 51.8085°N 2.9973°W
- Type: House
- Location: Llanover, Monmouthshire

History
- Built: mid 18th century, with earlier origins

Site notes
- Architectural style: Palladian

Cadw/ICOMOS Register of Parks and Gardens of Special Historic Interest in Wales
- Official name: Coldbrook Park
- Designated: 1 February 2022
- Reference no.: PGW(Gt)30(MON)
- Listing: Grade II

Listed Building – Grade II
- Official name: Coldbrook Chapel
- Designated: 31 January 2001
- Reference no.: 87654

Coldbrook Park, Llanover, Monmouthshire, Wales, was a major country house and estate. Home successively to the Herberts, the Hanburys and the Halls, the house was demolished in 1954. The estate, which remains privately owned, is listed on the Cadw/ICOMOS Register of Parks and Gardens of Special Historic Interest in Wales.

== History ==
The Monmouthshire antiquarian Sir Joseph Bradney suggests that the first recorded owner of the Coldbrook estate was Richard Herbert, second son of William ap Thomas of Raglan Castle. The Herbert family's origins were at Wern-ddu in the north of the county. Executed after the Battle of Banbury in 1469, Richard Herbert was buried in the Priory Church of St Mary, Abergavenny. In the mid-18th century, the estate was sold to John Hanbury (1664–1734) of Pontypool, who passed it to his third son, Charles Hanbury Williams (1708-1759). Hanbury Williams, a diplomat, poet and wit, undertook a major rebuilding of the mediaeval house in a Palladian style. William Coxe, who stayed at Coldbrook on his tour of Wales in 1799, devotes nine pages of his An Historical Tour of Monmouthshire to recording Hanbury Williams' anecdotes and witticisms. In the late 19th century, the park was bought by Lady Llanover, later coming into the ownership of Arthur Herbert, of Llanarth Court.

Following the death of Lady Helen Herbert, the contents of Coldbrook Park were dispersed at an 11-day sale in 1952, and the house was demolished in 1954. Coldbrook Park estate remains in the possession of the Herbert family, along with the adjacent estate at Llanover. In 2022, it was listed on the Cadw/ICOMOS Register of Parks and Gardens of Special Historic Interest in Wales.

== Architecture and description ==
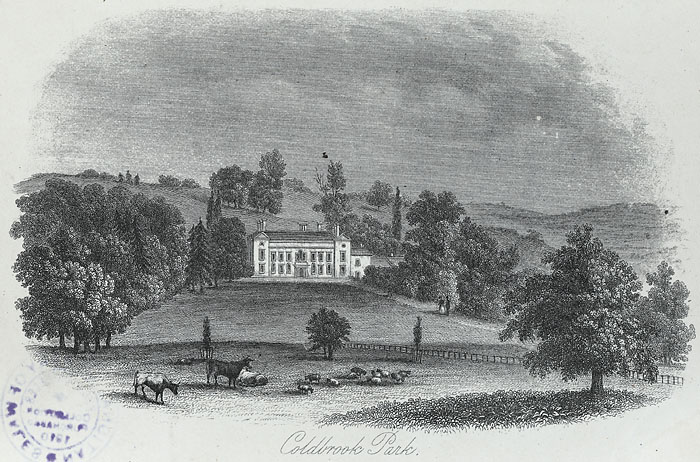
Coldbrook c. 1850

Little is known of the original house of the Herberts, although Bradney, writing in the very early 20th century, described parts as being "very ancient". (Note: A photograph of the mansion, published in Bradney's Abergavenny volume in 1906, shows a two-storey mansion with attics, flanked by two slim towers, and with a Venetian window above the porch.) The Royal Commission on the Ancient and Historical Monuments of Wales suggests 13/14th centuries origins for the building, with reconstruction in the Tudor era. Coxe, who saw Hanbury Williams' mid-18th century remodelling, considered it "delightfully situated", though more suited to occupation in the warm summer months as it was surrounded by trees and north-facing. (Note: Coxe recorded the presence of a number of family portraits at the house, and others including one of Henrietta Maria by Anthony van Dyck and another of Sir Robert Walpole, Hanbury Williams' friend and employer, by Jean-Baptiste van Loo.) John Newman, in his Gwent/Monmouthshire volume of the Pevsner Buildings of Wales was less complimentary, calling Hanbury Williams' designs, "somewhat gauche Palladian". Newman notes that nothing now remains of the house beyond some stables and outbuildings which have been converted to residential use.

The park dates mainly from the 18th century, with 19th and 21st century additions. However, the Parks & Gardens UK record suggests evidence of Tudor terracing. It also notes the existence of an external cold bath. (Note: The Georgian era saw a heightened interest in the physical and mental benefits of cold water bathing, and those that could afford to do so constructed bath houses, or plunge pools, on their estates. The physician John Floyer, who treated a young Samuel Johnson, wrote, "No part of Physick is more ancient than Cold Bathing, since we find many descripts of its good effects in our oldest authors...a Cold Regimen is proper to Cold Countries".) The park is listed at Grade II. A small chapel by a lake, constructed by Lady Llanover is also Grade II listed. (Note: The chapel was converted to a house in the early 21st century.)

== Sources ==
- Bradney, Joseph (1992) [1906]. A History of Monmouthshire: The Hundred of Abergavenny. Vol. 1, Part 2b. Academy Books. ISBN 978-1-873-36113-9. OCLC 60103879.
- Coxe, William (1995) [1801]. An Historical Tour of Monmouthshire: Volume 2. Cardiff: Merton Priory Press. ISBN 978-1-8989-3708-1. OCLC 34476778.
- Newman, John (2000). Gwent/Monmouthshire. The Buildings of Wales. Penguin. ISBN 0-14-071053-1.
