= Clytha Castle =

Folly in Monmouthshire, Wales

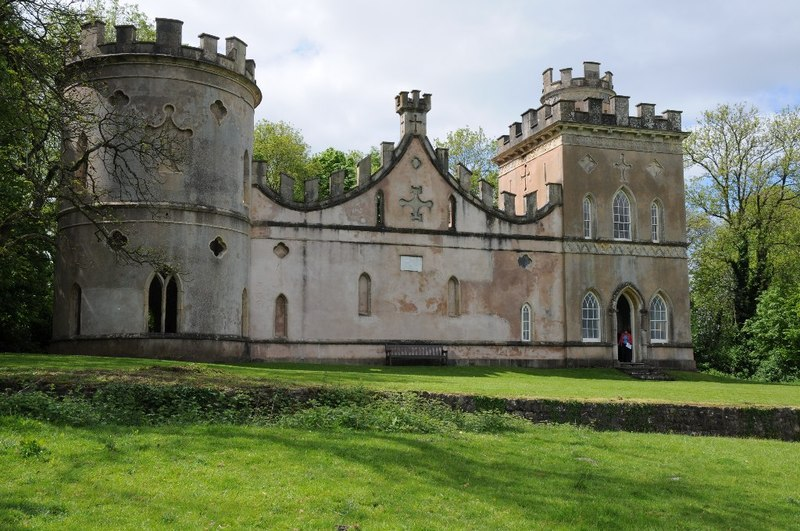
- "the Taj Mahal of Wales"

- Location within Monmouthshire
- 51.7706°N 2.9232°W
- Type: Folly
- Location: Clytha, Monmouthshire

History
- Built: 1790

Site notes
- Architect: John Davenport
- Architectural style: Strawberry Hill Gothick
- Governing body: Landmark Trust

Listed Building – Grade I
- Official name: Clytha Castle
- Designated: 9 January 1956
- Reference no.: 1968

Cadw/ICOMOS Register of Parks and Gardens of Special Historic Interest in Wales
- Official name: Clytha Park
- Designated: 1 February 2022
- Reference no.: PGW(Gt)15(Mon)
- Listing: Grade I

Clytha Castle (Welsh: Castell Cleidda) is a folly near Clytha between Llanarth and Raglan in Monmouthshire, south east Wales. Dating from 1790, the castle was built by William Jones, owner of the Clytha Park estate as a memorial to his wife, Elizabeth, who died in 1787. The castle is an example of the Gothic Revival and comprises three towers, of which two are habitable, and linking, castellated curtain walls. Long attributed to John Nash, recent research has confirmed that the architect was John Davenport of Shrewsbury. The folly has views towards the Sugar Loaf and Skirrid mountains on the easternmost edge of the Brecon Beacons National Park. Described by the architectural historian John Newman as one of the two "outstanding examples of late eighteenth century fanciful Gothic in the county", Clytha Castle is a Grade I listed building.

== Location ==
Clytha Castle is set close to the A40 Abergavenny to Raglan road, originally within the parkland that formed part of the estate of nearby Clytha Park, some four miles west of Raglan. The Monmouthshire antiquarian Sir Joseph Bradney, in his multi-volume A History of Monmouthshire from the Coming of the Normans into Wales down to the Present Time, records that the castle was connected to the park by a carriage drive that crossed the Clytha Gorge via a suspension bridge. (Note: By 1975 the suspension bridge had become derelict and it was demolished.) The setting gives "magnificent views" across the valley to the Skirrid and Sugar Loaf Mountains.

== History and description ==
Clytha Castle is a crenellated stone folly with gothic windows set on a rounded hill, amid chestnut groves, overlooking Clytha Park and the River Usk. It was built in 1790 by William Jones of Clytha Park in memory of his wife, Elizabeth Morgan. William Jones engaged John Davenport, an architect based in Shrewsbury to design the castle, built "for the purpose of relieving a mind sincerely afflicted by the loss of a most excellent wife". A tablet set into the walls of the folly records this dedication. (Note: Elizabeth Morgan is buried in the Church of St Teilo at Llanarth, where an obelisk forms her other monument. John Newman describes it as "entirely covered with her husband William's expressions of woe, in prose and verse".) The castle was for many years believed to have been designed by John Nash, but recent research has confirmed Davenport's authorship.

The folly experts Gwyn Headley and Wim Meulenkamp describe the architectural style deployed at Clytha as "a late fling of Strawberry Hill Gothick” and the building as "the Taj Mahal of Wales". John Newman considers it one of the two "outstanding examples of late eighteenth century fanciful Gothic in the county". (Note: The other outstanding example of Gothic are the gates on the Raglan to Abergavenny road at the entrance to Clytha Park.) Built of rendered rubble stone with Bath stone dressing, the plan is L shaped, with a square, two-storeyed central block, with screen walls and drum towers to either side. The building's proportions, and its landscape setting, contribute to its success as an eyecatcher; "everything is big and simple, to (be) read from a distance." The round tower is roofless and was designed as a shell in order to add symmetry to the facade. John Claudius Loudon, horticulturalist and historian of the Picturesque was not impressed, describing the folly as "gaudy and affectedly common". The Cadw listing record describes Clytha Castle, which it designates a Grade I listed building, as "one of the outstanding 18th century follies of Wales". The garden and park at Clytha, which include the castle, are designated Grade I on the Register of Parks and Gardens of Special Historic Interest in Wales.

Clytha Castle is in the care of the Landmark Trust, which has maintained the building since 1974, and is available to rent.

== Sources ==
- Bradney, Joseph (1992). A History of Monmouthshire: The Hundred of Raglan, Volume 2 Part 1. Academy Books. ISBN 1-873361-15-7.
- Evans, Cyril James Oswald (1953). Monmouthshire: Its History and Topography. Cardiff: William Lewis Printers. OCLC 2415203.
- Headley, Gwyn; Meulenkamp, Wim (1999). Follies, Grottoes and Garden Buildings. London: Aurum Press. ISBN 9781854106254. OCLC 1008038820.
- Jenkins, Simon (2008). Wales: Churches, Houses, Castles. London: Penguin. ISBN 978-0-713-99893-1.
- Keen, Richard; Burgum, Ian (1997). Wales. London: Orion Publishing Group. ISBN 9780753802083.
- Newman, John (2000). Gwent/Monmouthshire. The Buildings of Wales. London: Penguin. ISBN 0-14-071053-1.
- Whittle, Elisabeth (1990). Cadw/Icomos Register of Parks and Gardens of Special Historic Interest in Wales: Clytha Park. Cadw & RCAHMW.
