= Chapel Farmhouse, Llanarth =

Chapel Farmhouse
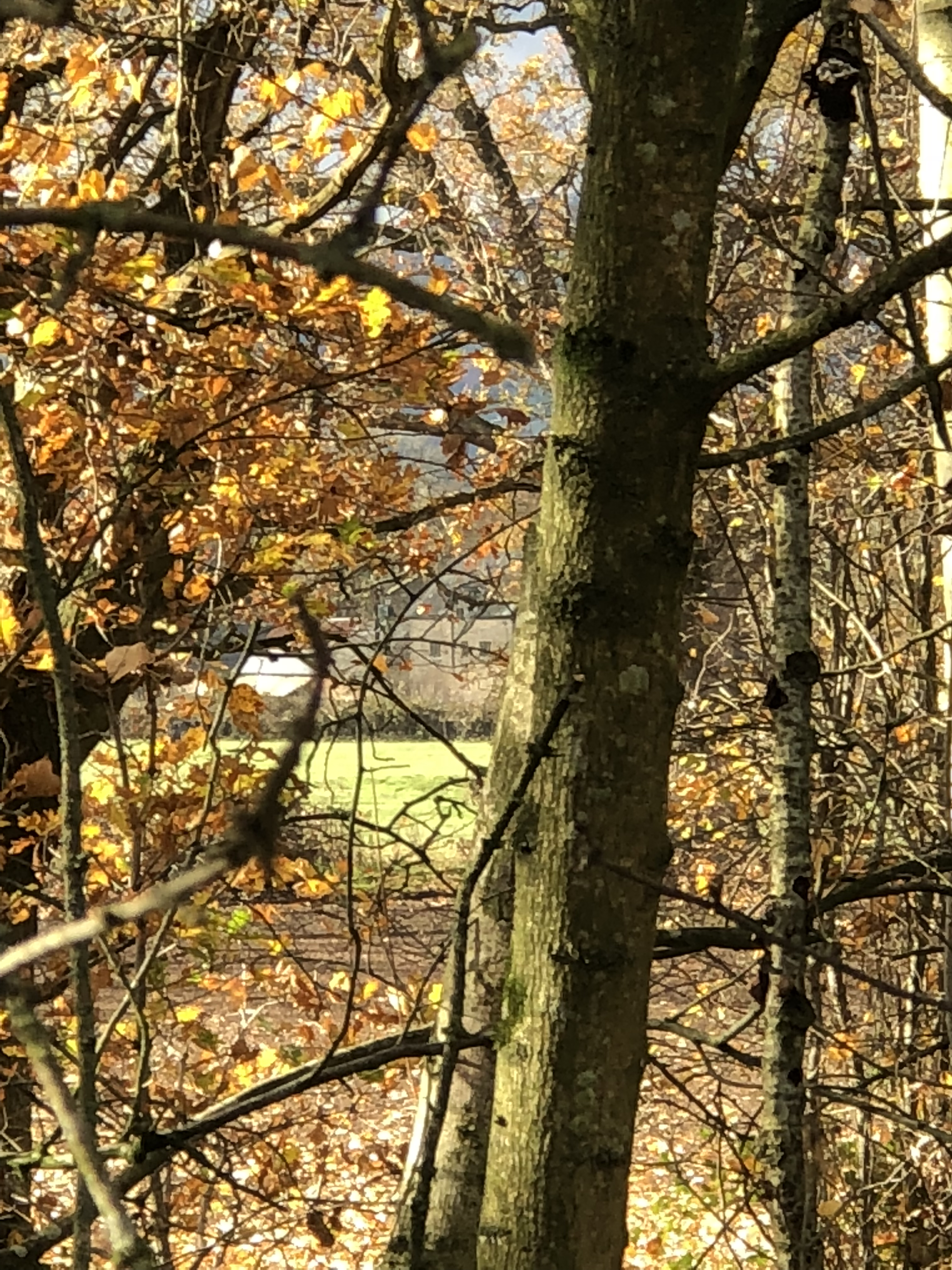
- "an impressively intact 16th century farmhouse"

- Location within Monmouthshire
- 51.7797°N 2.9166°W
- Type: House
- Location: Llanarth, Monmouthshire

History
- Built: 16th and 17th centuries

Site notes
- Architectural style: vernacular
- Governing body: Privately owned

Listed Building – Grade II*
- Official name: Chapel Farmhouse and attached outbuilding
- Designated: 9 January 1956
- Reference no.: 1965

Chapel Farmhouse and its attached outbuilding, Llanarth, Monmouthshire is a house dating from the 16th century. Greatly enlarged in the 17th century, it remains a private house. It is a Grade II* listed building.

== History ==
Cadw notes the "eccentric" relationship" of the two wings of the house and suggests this is evidence that the house was reconstructed from earlier buildings, probably a 14th-century manor house. The architectural historian John Newman notes the "historically" important existence of a raised cruck truss in the hall of the house which he suggests places it as a transitional building between the traditional, single-level, Welsh hall house and later, storeyed, buildings. What stands today represents two construction periods of the late 16th and early 17th centuries, with some 19th-century reconstruction. The National Trust suggests that Chapel Farm may have operated as the home farm for the Clytha Park Estate. Owned by the Jones family from the 18th century, it remains a private residence.

== Architecture and description ==
The house is of stone, to an L-plan, the taller, East, range being of the 17th century and the lower, Southeast, range of the 16th. John Newman describes Chapel farm as "unusually well-preserved". Sir Cyril Fox and Lord Raglan, in their three-volume study Monmouthshire Houses, include detailed sketch plans of the house, together with a chronological interpretation in which they identify three building phases, the medieval, the 1580s and the 1620s. The National Trust notes the "impressive array of buildings, with a fine cart shed range". The farmhouse is a Grade II* listed building, its listing record describing it as "impressively intact".
