= The Pant, Llanvihangel-Ystern-Llewern =

The Pant
- "remarkably unaltered"

- Location within Monmouthshire
- 51.8221°N 2.8379°W
- Type: House
- Location: Llanvihangel-Ystern-Llewern, Monmouthshire
- OS grid reference: SO423140

History
- Built: 16th and 17th centuries

Site notes
- Governing body: Privately owned

Listed Building – Grade II*
- Official name: The Pant including attached former Quaker Meeting House
- Designated: 1 May 1952
- Reference no.: 2057

The Pant, Llanvihangel-Ystern-Llewern, Monmouthshire is a hall-house dating from the 16th century with an attached 17th century Quaker meeting house. It is a Grade II* listed building.

== History ==
The original hall house dates from the mid-16th century. It is a "remarkably unaltered" late-medieval house. The Quaker meeting house was constructed in the 17th century, and the architectural historian John Newman notes the date of 1687 on a beam in the house may refer to the meeting house's construction. Walter Jenkins, an early Quaker, and son of Thomas Jenkins who was the rector at Llanvihangel-ystern-llewern, was born at the house. He was imprisoned for his beliefs at Monmouth and died in 1661. His daughter Elizabeth, mother of Elisha Beadles, married John Beadles and they lived at the Pant in the later 17th century. John Beadles is the likely builder of the meeting house. In the 20th century, the property was owned by Sir Joseph Bradney of Tal-y-coed Court and author of the twelve-volume A History of Monmouthshire from the Coming of the Normans into Wales down to the Present Time.

== Architecture and description ==
The late medieval hall-house dates from the mid-16th century and has cruck-truss end walls which were subsequently rebuilt in brick. It has a roof of Welsh slate and two prominent chimney stacks.

The meeting house is of brick, with two storeys and a basement. The interiors of both houses have been little altered since their construction and The Pant is a Grade II* listed building, its designation record describing it as "a medieval hall-house with Quaker Meeting House retaining original detail of remarkably high quality".
