= Grade II* listed buildings in Blaenau Gwent =

Blaenau Gwent shown within Wales

In the United Kingdom, the term listed building refers to a building or other structure officially designated as being of special architectural, historical, or cultural significance; Grade II* structures are those considered to be "particularly important buildings of more than special interest". Listing was begun by a provision in the Town and Country Planning Act 1947. Once listed, strict limitations are imposed on the modifications allowed to a building's structure or fittings. In Wales, the authority for listing under the Planning (Listed Buildings and Conservation Areas) Act 1990 rests with Cadw.

== Buildings ==
| Name | Location Grid Ref. (Note: Sometimes known as OSGB36, the grid reference is based on the British national grid reference system used by the Ordnance Survey.) Geo-coordinates | Date Listed | Function | Notes | Reference Number | Image |
|---|---|---|---|---|---|---|
| The Town Clock | Tredegar; SO1416308825; 51°46′17″N 3°14′43″W | 25 May 1962 | Clock tower | Very prominently located in the centre of The Circle. | 1861 | See more images |
| SW Roundhouse at Roundhouse Farm | Nantyglo and Blaina; SO1891910187; 51°47′04″N 3°10′37″W | 29 June 1950 | Farm building | Roundhouse Farm is situated on the valley bottom, W of Nantyglo. Farm reached off the end of Waun Ebbw Road. SW tower located some 40 metres away from farmyard. | 1863 | See more images |
| St Illtyd's Church | Llanhilleth; SO2179801954; 51°42′39″N 3°08′00″W | 6 June 1962 | Church | Set in centre of small settlement of St Illtyd, on N side of by-road. Large circular churchyard with remains of medieval churchyard cross some 10 metres N of church. | 1866 | See more images |
| Former boiler house at Dunlop Semtex rubber factory | Brynmawr; SO1906211463; 51°47′45″N 3°10′30″W | 5 August 1986 | Boiler House | Prominently sited on the E side of the A467 on the S edge of Brynmawr, opposite main Dunlop Semtex factory complex (separately listed within Nantyglo and Blaina Community). | 1869 | See more images |
| NE Roundhouse at Roundhouse Farm | Nantyglo and Blaina; SO1901310275; 51°47′07″N 3°10′32″W | 29 June 1950 | Farm building | Roundhouse Farm is situated on the valley bottom, W of Nantyglo. Farm reached off the end of Waun Ebbw Road. NE tower located alongside main entrance to farmyard. | 17086 | See more images |
| Agricultural Range at Roundhouse Farm | Nantyglo and Blaina; SO1895910227; 51°47′05″N 3°10′35″W | 30 July 1996 | Farm building | Roundhouse Farm is situated on the valley bottom, W of Nantyglo. Farm reached off the end of Waun Ebbw Road, with the agricultural range situated S of the early C20 farmhouse. | 17087 | Upload Photo |
| Milgatw | Tredegar; SO1327411668; 51°47′49″N 3°15′32″W | 14 October 1999 | House | Blaen-y-cwm is reached off the Tredegar-Trefil Road, from Nant-y-bwch. Located some 1 km N of Tredegar. Milgatw is located at the end of the no-through road. | 22494 | Upload Photo |
| Sirhowy Ironworks | Tredegar; SO1427810141; 51°47′00″N 3°14′39″W | 14 October 1999 | Ironworks | Graham’s Yard is located off Dukestown Road. Ironworks is set into hillside to E. | 22496 | See more images |
| British Steel Tinplate Works General Office | Ebbw Vale; SO1714709429; 51°46′39″N 3°12′08″W | 29 October 1999 | Works office | Prominently located along Steelworks Road, on E fringe of massive steelworks complex. | 22530 | See more images |
| Furnace Bank | Ebbw Vale; SO1715809728; 51°46′48″N 3°12′08″W | 29 October 1999 | Furnaces | Set back from the E side of Steelworks Road, to rear of factory buildings, and opposite the main entrance to Ebbw Vale Steelworks. | 22531 | Upload Photo |

== See also ==
- Listed buildings in Wales
- Grade II* listed buildings in Powys
- Grade II* listed buildings in Monmouthshire
- Grade II* listed buildings in Torfaen
- Grade II* listed buildings in Caerphilly
- List of Scheduled Monuments in Blaenau Gwent
