= St Teilo's Church, Llanarth =

Coordinates: 51.7938°N 2.9067°W

St Teilo's Church, Llanarth, Monmouthshire
- Church of St Teilo
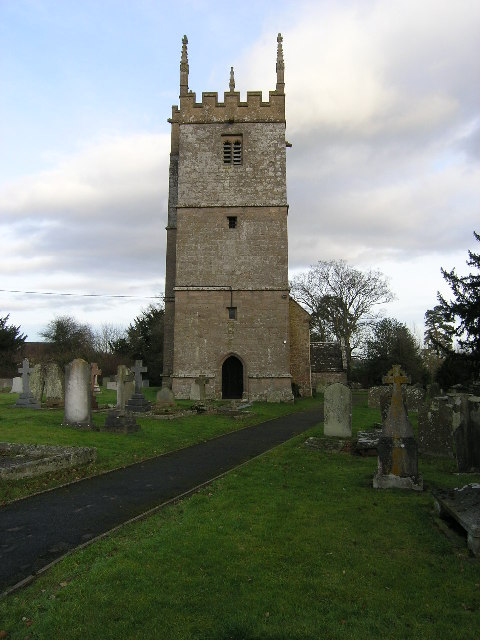
- The entrance and tower

- Location in Monmouthshire
- Location: Llanarth, Monmouthshire
- Country: Wales
- Denomination: Church in Wales

History
- Status: parish church
- Founded: C15th century

Architecture
- Functional status: Redundant
- Heritage designation: Grade II*
- Designated: 9 January 1956
- Architectural type: Church

Administration
- Diocese: Monmouth
- Archdeaconry: Monmouth
- Deanery: Raglan/Usk
- Parish: Llanarth

The Church of St Teilo, Llanarth, Monmouthshire, Wales is a former parish church with its origins in the 15th century. Renovations took place in the 18th, 19th and 20th centuries. It is a Grade II* listed building and is now a redundant church, having closed in 2013.

== History ==
The church is dedicated to Saint Teilo, a 6th-century Bishop of Llandaff. It is predominantly of the 15th century. John Prichard undertook renovations in 1847. Further work was undertaken by Richard Creed in 1884–5, including the reconstruction of the top of the tower. St Teilo's is no longer an active church, the high cost of repairs leading to its closure in 2013. In 2023 the Village Alive Trust received a £10,000 grant for a feasibility study on the conversion of the church into a community centre.

== Architecture and description ==
The church is built of sandstone rubble, in a Decorated style. The interior contains a number of funerary monuments, including an obelisk in white marble, erected in memory of Elizabeth Jones. The monument was raised by her husband, William Jones of Clytha Park, who also built the folly Clytha Castle in her memory.
