= Clytha =

Hamlet and historical area in Wales

Coordinates: 51.785°N 2.912778°W

Clytha: Welsh: Cleidda
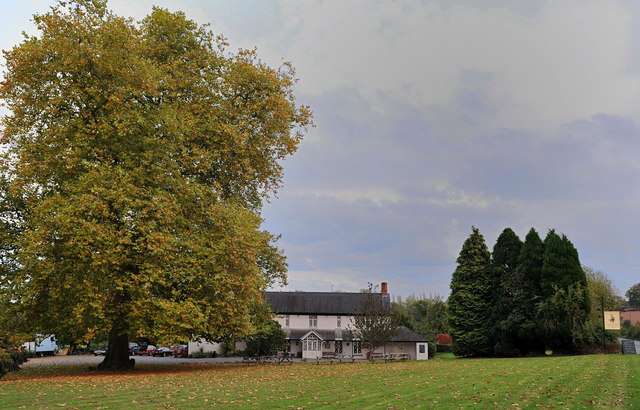
- The Clytha Arms

- Location within Monmouthshire
- Principal area: Monmouthshire
- Preserved county: Gwent
- Country: Wales
- Sovereign state: United Kingdom
- Police: Gwent
- Fire: South Wales
- Ambulance: Welsh
- UK Parliament: Monmouth

Clytha (Welsh: Cleidda) is a hamlet and historical area in Monmouthshire, Wales.

== Overview ==
It lies just off the A40 road, to the south of Llanarth and west of Raglan. It contains Clytha Park and Clytha Castle and Llanarth Estate Office, Ty Gwynt and Pit House. The castle, the park and The Clytha Arms public house, however, lie on the southern side of the A40. The hamlet lies within the parish of Llanarth and covered 1841 acres with a population of 361 people in 1861.

Clytha is home to the first polo club in Wales, the Monmouthshire Polo Club, founded in 1872 by Reginald and Francis Herbert.

Great House, Clytha is a Grade II listed building.

The Clytha Arms, a converted Dower house, holds an annual Cider Festival on May Bank Holidays.
