= Clytha Park =

House in Clytha, Monmouthshire, Wales

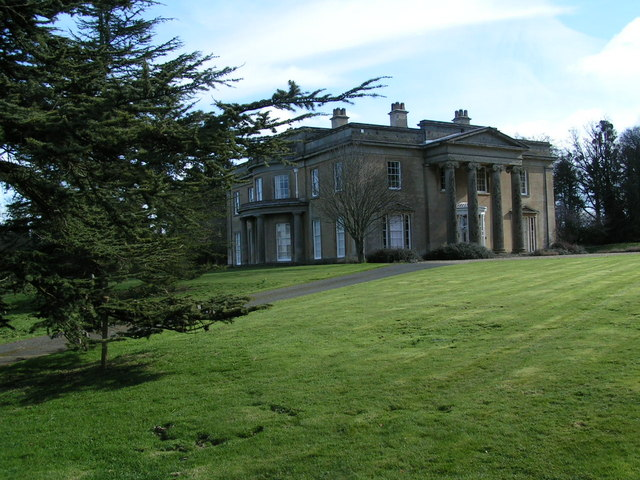
- "one of the best neo-classical houses in Wales"

- Location within Monmouthshire
- 51.7763°N 2.9193°W
- Type: House
- Location: Clytha, Monmouthshire

History
- Built: 1820-8

Site notes
- Architect: Edward Haycock
- Architectural style: Neo-classical
- Governing body: National Trust

Listed Building – Grade I
- Official name: Clytha Park
- Designated: 9 January 1956
- Reference no.: 1941

Listed Building – Grade II*
- Official name: Gateway and railings to Clytha Park
- Designated: 9 January 1956
- Reference no.: 1967

Listed Building – Grade II
- Official name: The Lodge at Clytha Park
- Designated: 15 March 2000
- Reference no.: 23003

Listed Building – Grade II
- Official name: Walled garden at Clytha Park
- Designated: 15 March 2000
- Reference no.: 22998

Cadw/ICOMOS Register of Parks and Gardens of Special Historic Interest in Wales
- Official name: Clytha Park
- Designated: 1 February 2022
- Reference no.: PGW(Gt)15(Mon)
- Listing: Grade I

Clytha Park, Clytha, Monmouthshire, is a 19th-century Neoclassical country house, "the finest early nineteenth century Greek Revival house in the county." The wider estate encompasses Monmouthshire's "two outstanding examples of late eighteenth century Gothic", the gates to the park and Clytha Castle. The owners were the Jones family, later Herbert, of Treowen and Llanarth Court. It is a Grade I listed building.

Although owned by the National Trust, as of April 2021 the house is occupied by tenants and is not open to individuals, but may be visited by "heritage or conservation-based groups" by prior appointment.

The park surrounding the house is listed Grade I on the Cadw/ICOMOS Register of Parks and Gardens of Special Historic Interest in Wales as a “very fine example of a late 18th-century landscape”.

== History ==
The original house on the site, Clytha House, was built by the Berkeley family of Spetchley Park in Worcestershire. It was subsequently purchased by William Jones the Elder, who constructed the gates and Clytha Castle. His son, William Jones the Younger, from 1862 Herbert, razed the Georgian mansion to the ground and replaced it with the Neoclassical Clytha Park. The Monmouthshire antiquarian Sir Joseph Bradney, in his multi-volume A History of Monmouthshire from the Coming of the Normans into Wales down to the Present Time, records that Jones's attempts to change his name to Herbert occasioned a long feud with his near neighbour, Lord Llanover, the Lord Lieutenant of Monmouthshire, who sought to block the change; "A long and acrimonious, and at times highly humorous, correspondence ensued in the newspapers and a debate on the subject took place in the house of commons".

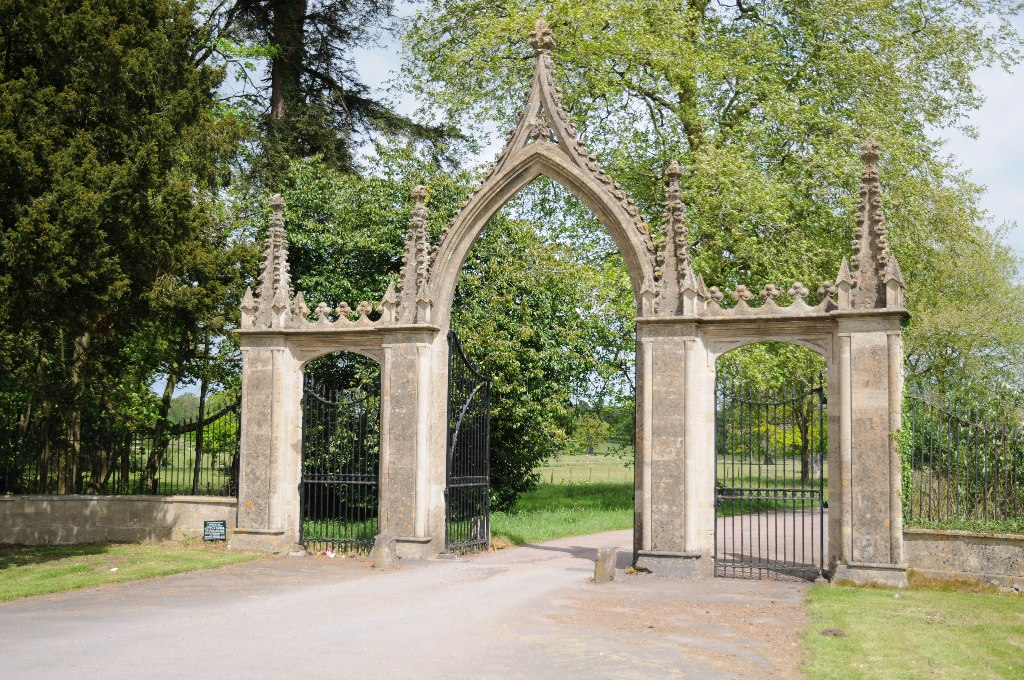
Clytha Park, Monmouthshire - The Gates

Beginning work on his inheritance in 1820, Jones used the Shrewsbury architect, Edward Haycock Snr. In the later 19th century, the house contained the painting, The Deluge by Francis Danby. At the end of the Second World War the estate was inherited as part of the Pontypool Park Estate by Richard Hanbury-Tenison, a former military officer who then pursued a career in the Diplomatic service. In 1955 he married Euphan Wardlaw-Ramsay, and from 1957 with the architect Donald Insall, they undertook the restoration of the wider estate including demolition of the substantial rear service building to leave the present square plan house. In 1972 they donated Clytha to the National Trust in lieu of death duties, although the family retained a leasehold on the house where they still live today.

The Clytha estate encompasses Monmouthshire's "two outstanding examples of late eighteenth century Gothic", the gates to the park and Clytha Castle. Overlooking the house, on a prominent hill, stands the folly of Clytha Castle, constructed by William Jones the Elder in memory of his wife. Long attributed to John Nash, recent documentary discovery has shown that it was designed by John Davenport, who also laid out the grounds, a "well-preserved (example of) a late eighteenth century landscape park". The original canal in the grounds by Davenport was extended in the early 19th century to create the present lake, the spoil from the excavations being used to create a raised platform for the new house. The park was further developed by Henry Avray Tipping in the early 20th century.

On the old Abergavenny-to-Raglan road stand the entrance gates, again reputedly by John Nash, who did undertake work in South Wales. A lodge is set to one side. They are earlier than the house, of 1797. The entry in Mee's The King's England suggests that the gateway came from the ruined mansion of Perth-hir near Rockfield but this is disputed. (Note: Cyril Evans, in his county history, Monmouthshire: Its History and Topography, published in 1953, suggests that the gateway and another doorway which were brought from Perth-Hir, are not those at the main entrance, but are structures in the walled garden at Clytha. This corresponds with Cadw's dating of two doorways in the garden to the Tudor period. John Newman, and Elisabeth Whittle also support this interpretation.) (Note: The Dicamillo Guide records some Jacobean panelling in the dining room at Clytha Park which it suggests was brought from Perth-hir.)

== Architecture and description ==
The architectural historian John Newman considers Clytha, "the finest early nineteenth century Greek Revival house in the county", while John V. Hiling, in his study The Architecture of Wales: From the first to the twenty-first century, describes it as "the most robust and gracious example of the neo-Grec movement in Wales". Peter Smith, in his 1975 (2nd edition 1988) study, Houses of the Welsh Countryside, concurs, calling it "the best of the Greek revival". The building is a square in the Greek Doric style, of ashlar with sandstone dressings. It is of two storeys and has a "fine centr(al) sandstone Ionic tetrastyle portico". The interior is pure Doric, with a circular vestibule leading to a spacious, top-lit, staircase hall.

The house was designated a Grade I listed building on 1 September 1956, the gates have their own Grade II* listing, while the lodge is today listed Grade II. Cadw's listing describes Clytha Park as "one of the best neo-classical houses in Wales". The gardens and park at Clytha are designated Grade I on the Cadw/ICOMOS Register of Parks and Gardens of Special Historic Interest in Wales.

== Sources ==
- Attlee, Helena (2009). The Gardens of Wales. London: Frances Lincoln. ISBN 978-0-7112-2882-5.
- Bradney, Joseph (1992). A History of Monmouthshire: The Hundred of Raglan, Volume 2 Part 1. Academy Books. ISBN 1-873361-15-7.
- Evans, Cyril James Oswald (1953). Monmouthshire: Its History and Topography. Cardiff: William Lewis Printers. OCLC 2415203.
- Hiling, John B. (2018). The Architecture of Wales: From the First to the Twenty-First Centuries. Cardiff: University of Wales Press. ISBN 978-1-786-83285-6.
- Newman, John (2000). Gwent/Monmouthshire. The Buildings of Wales. London: Penguin. ISBN 0-14-071053-1.
- Smith, Peter (1988). Houses of the Welsh Countryside. London: Her Majesty's Stationery Office. ISBN 9-78011-300012-8.
- Tyerman, Hugo; Warner, Sydney (1951). Arthur Mee (ed.). Monmouthshire: A Green and Smiling Land. The King's England. London: Hodder & Stoughton. OCLC 906097367.
- Whittle, Elisabeth (1990). Cadw/Icomos Register of Parks and Gardens of Special Historic Interest in Wales: Clytha Park (PDF). Cadw & RCAHMW.
