= Wern-ddu Farmhouse, Llantilio Pertholey =

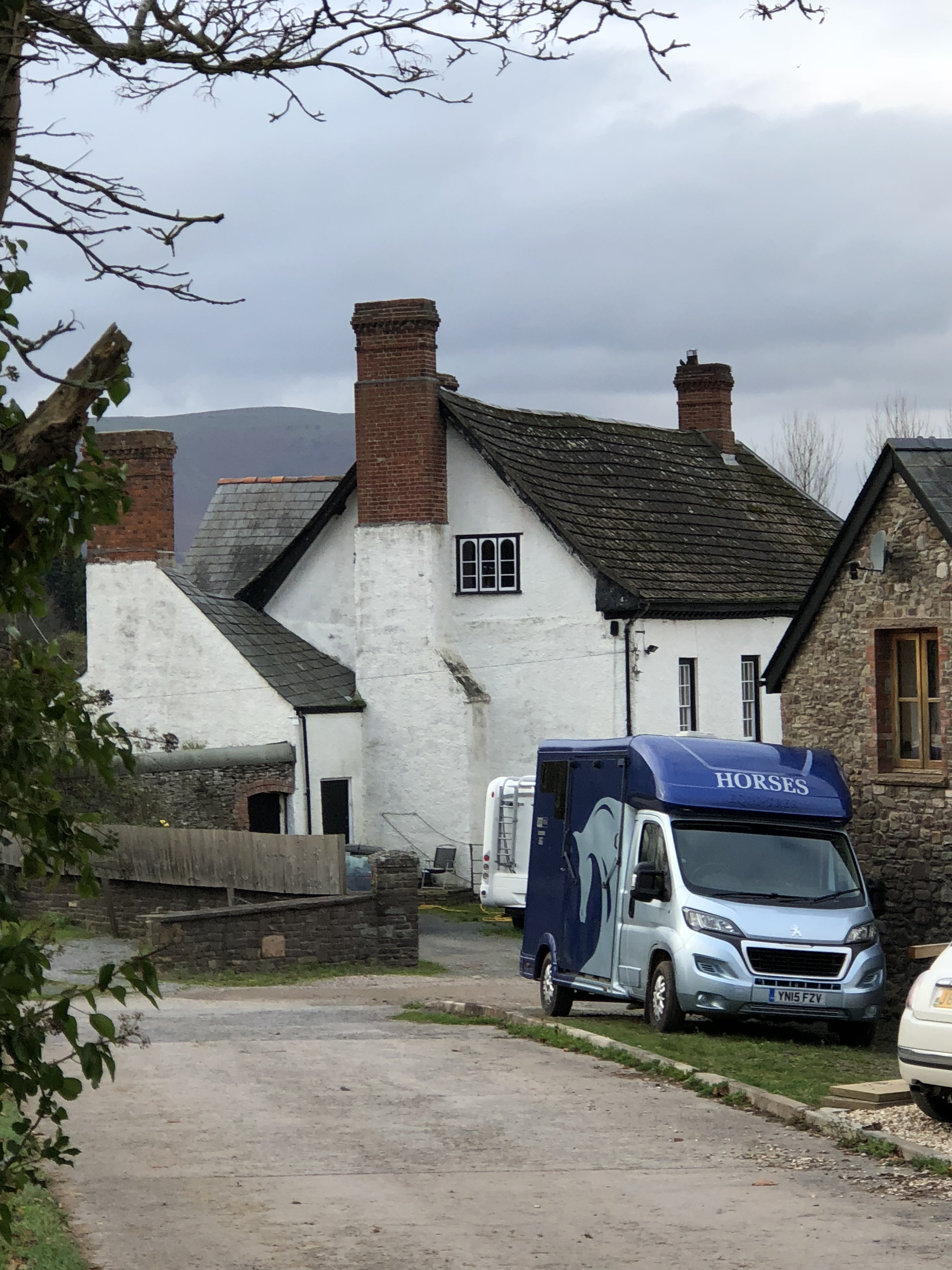
- "a well preserved 17th century house"

- Location within Monmouthshire
- 51.8319°N 2.9871°W
- Type: Farmhouse
- Location: Llantilio Pertholey, Monmouthshire

History
- Built: 17th century

Site notes
- Architectural style: Vernacular

Listed Building – Grade II*
- Official name: Wern-ddu Farmhouse
- Designated: 6 May 1952
- Reference no.: 1927

Wern-ddu farmhouse, Llantilio Pertholey, Monmouthshire is a farmhouse of 17th century origins. It has been significantly altered in the 18th, 19th and 20th centuries and the Monmouthshire antiquarian, Sir Joseph Bradney recorded that it had "suffered so much by continual alterations that it shows but little of its antiquity". It is a Grade II* listed building.

== History ==
Sir Joseph Bradney described Wern-ddu as "in its origins one of the oldest in the county". He ascribed the original building to the Herbert family. Cadw considers the current building to date from the early 17th century, while the architectural historian John Newman places it somewhat later, in the late 17th century. Sir Cyril Fox and Lord Raglan, in the second of their three-volume history of vernacular architecture Monmouthshire Houses, give a date of c.1675. Wern-ddu was reconstructed in the 18th, 19th and 20th centuries and Bradney recorded in the early 20th century that "it shows but little of its antiquity". It remains a private house.

The historical importance of the house was long recognised. The American journalist and diplomat Wirt Sikes, United States consul at Cardiff in the 1870s and 1880s, recorded an encounter between its last hereditary owner, Roger ap Probert, and a stranger, in his Rambles and Studies in Old South Wales, published in 1881. Questioned as to the history of the house, Probert replied; "Werndu (is) a very ancient house. Out of it came the Earls of Pembroke, the Lords Herbert of Cherbury, the Herberts of Coldbrook, the Joneses of Treowen and Llanarth and all the Powells; also, by the female line, came the Dukes of Beaufort".

== Architecture and description ==
John Newman describes the farmhouse as being of a "semi-double-pile plan". It is built of rendered Old Red Sandstone rubble and is of two storeys with attics, and a three-storey stair turret. The roof is of Welsh slate. It contains an important staircase, which Newman considers "a fine piece" and a "coffered wooden ceiling with bold mouldings". It is a Grade II* listed building.
