= Elisha Beadles =

Quaker and writer (1670 -1734)

Elisha Beadles (1670–1734) was a member of the Quaker movement and a translator.

== Early life ==
Beadles was born in 1670. His parents were Elizabeth (née Jenkins) and John Beadles. His mother was the daughter of Quaker Walter Jenkins who had inherited the Pant estate in Llanvihangel-Ystern-Llewern, Monmouthshire and was jailed in Cardiff in 1660 or 1661 for refusing to swear and had died and was buried in 1662. Beadle's mother, Jenkin's only child, inherited Pant. Beadle's father was a Quaker from Kempston, Bedfordshire, England.

== Career ==
He moved to Pontymoile, where he worked as a mercer and apothecary. Beadles was described as "extremely prosperous", having £691 in inventory, when most apothecaries had inventories valued up to £10.

He became involved in the establishment of Quakerism in the area at the turn of the century and attended the first recorded monthly meeting in the area in 1703. He wrote and translated works about the Quaker movement, including documenting for the Meeting for Sufferings in London the manner in which the movement was developing in South Wales in 1720. He created the 1715 translation Y Gyfraith a roddwyd allan o Zion, a Gorchmynion Arglwydd y Bywyd (yr hwn ydyw yr Arglwydd or Nef) gwedi i hysbysu i dynion of his Grandfather Jenkins' English devotional book, The law given forth out of Zion.

== Personal life ==
In 1699, he married Anne Handley. Thought to be connected with other emigrating Welsh Quakers, several of Beadles' children sailed to America in the 1720s and 1730s. Handley was in Philadelphia and died during a voyage to the British Isles, drowning off the Irish coast in December 1728. Richard died in Jamaica in June 1729. Their brother, Elisha, settled in New York and worked as a baker to the government of New York.

Beadles died at about the age of 64 in 1734.
