= Registered historic parks and gardens in Blaenau Gwent =

List of landscapes in county of Wales

Blaenau Gwent shown within Wales

Blaenau Gwent is a county borough in the south-east of Wales. It borders the unitary authority areas of Monmouthshire and Torfaen to the east, Caerphilly to the west and Powys to the north. Its main towns are Abertillery, Brynmawr, Ebbw Vale and Tredegar. It covers an area of 109 km^{2} (42 sq mi) and in 2023 the population was approximately 66,993.

The Cadw/ICOMOS Register of Parks and Gardens of Special Historic Interest in Wales was established in 2002 and given statutory status in 2022. It is administered by Cadw, the historic environment agency of the Welsh Government. It includes just under 400 sites, ranging from gardens of private houses, to cemeteries and public parks. Parks and gardens are listed at one of three grades, matching the grading system used for listed buildings. Grade I is the highest grade, for sites of exceptional interest; Grade II*, the next highest, denotes parks and gardens of more than special interest; while Grade II denotes nationally important sites of special interest.

Blaenau Gwent has only one site on the register, the grounds of Bedwellty House in Tredegar. These are listed at Grade II.

== List of parks and gardens ==
Grade	Criteria
I	Parks and gardens of exceptional interest
II*	Particularly important parks and gardens of more than special interest
II	Parks and gardens of national importance and special interest

List of parks and gardens
Name	Location Grid Ref. (Note: Sometimes known as OSGB36, the grid reference is based on the British national grid reference system used by the Ordnance Survey.) Geo-coordinates	Date Listed	Site type	Description / Notes	Grade	Reference Number	Image
Bedwellty Park	Tredegar; SO 14339 08501; 51°46′07″N 3°14′34″W	1 February 2022	Garden	The Bedwellty estate was bought by the ironmaster Samuel Homfray in 1800. He built the current house, which his son extended while also developing the grounds. It was bought by the Morgans of Tredegar House who gave it to the people of Tredegar as a public park in 1901. The park contains the town's war memorial, a rare listed icehouse and two large blocks of coal, cut to celebrate the Great Exhibition of 1851, and the Festival of Britain in 1951.	II	PGW(Gt)39(BLG)	Bandstand and flowerbeds

== See also ==
- List of scheduled monuments in Blaenau Gwent
- Grade II* listed buildings in Blaenau Gwent
