= Church of St Michael and All Angels, Llanvihangel-Ystern-Llewern =

Coordinates: 51.8213°N 2.8243°W

St Michael and All Angels, Llanvihangel-Ystern-Llewern
- Church of St Michael and All Angels
- "a fine wagon roof and unusual timber-framed belfry"

- Location in Monmouthshire
- Location: Llanvihangel-Ystern-Llewern, Monmouthshire
- Country: Wales
- Denomination: Church in Wales

History
- Status: parish church
- Founded: C15th century

Architecture
- Functional status: Active
- Heritage designation: Grade II*
- Designated: 19 November 1953
- Architectural type: Church

Administration
- Diocese: Monmouth
- Archdeaconry: Monmouth
- Deanery: Monmouth
- Parish: Llanfihangel-ystern-Llewern

Clergy
- Vicar: The Reverend G J R Williams

The Church of St Michael and All Angels, Llanvihangel-Ystern-Llewern, Monmouthshire, Wales, is a parish church with its origins in the 15th century. Renovations took place in the 19th century under the direction of Thomas Henry Wyatt. It is a Grade II* listed building and an active parish church.

== History ==
The church dates from the medieval period but the building fabric cannot be dated with certainty. The nave roof and the windows are late 15th century. An extensive restoration was carried out by T. H. Wyatt in 1874, the belfry, with its timber base, dating from this restoration. Refurbishment of the interior in the early 20th century saw the addition of a stained glass window depicting Saint George and the Dragon by Charles Eamer Kempe, which dates from 1906 to 1907. A tablet in the church commemorates the Monmouthshire historian and antiquarian Sir Joseph Bradney, who lived nearby at Tal-y-coed Court and wrote a 12-volume history of the county, A History of Monmouthshire from the Coming of the Normans into Wales down to the Present Time. St Michael's remains an active parish church.

== Architecture and description ==
The church is built of "all-too friable" Old Red Sandstone rubble. The nave, chancel and belfry are all by Wyatt, the porch being slightly later, of 1895. The nave has an original medieval wagon vault roof. The church is a Grade II* listed building, its listing noting its "fine 15th century wagon roof and unusual 19th century timber-framed belfry".
