= Registered historic parks and gardens in Wrexham County Borough =

List of landscapes in county borough of Wales

Wrexham County Borough shown within Wales

Wrexham County Borough is a county borough in the north-east of Wales. It covers an area of 503.7 km^{2} (194.5 sq mi) and in 2021 the population was approximately 135,100.

The Cadw/ICOMOS Register of Parks and Gardens of Special Historic Interest in Wales was established in 2002 and given statutory status in 2022. It is administered by Cadw, the historic environment agency of the Welsh Government. It includes just under 400 sites, ranging from gardens of private houses, to cemeteries and public parks. Parks and gardens are listed at one of three grades, matching the grading system used for listed buildings. Grade I is the highest grade, for sites of exceptional interest; Grade II*, the next highest, denotes parks and gardens of more than special interest; while Grade II denotes nationally important sites of special interest.

There are 17 registered parks and gardens in Wrexham. Three are listed at grade I, three at grade II*, and eleven at grade II.

== List of parks and gardens ==
| Grade | Criteria |
|---|---|
| I | Parks and gardens of exceptional interest |
| II* | Particularly important parks and gardens of more than special interest |
| II | Parks and gardens of national importance and special interest |

List of parks and gardens
| Name | Location Grid Ref. (Note: Sometimes known as OSGB36, the grid reference is based on the British national grid reference system used by the Ordnance Survey.) Geo-coordinates | Date Listed | Site type | Description / Notes | Grade | Reference Number | Image |
|---|---|---|---|---|---|---|---|
| Argoed Hall | Llangollen Rural; SJ2679941371; 52°57′52″N 3°05′24″W | 1 February 2022 | Garden | Parks and Woodlands Formal terraced garden; informal woodland grounds. The remains of a Victorian garden and extensive woodland grounds laid out with walks on a steep slope above the River Dee and with a lake on the flood plain. | II | PGW(C)42(WRE) | |
| Bettisfield Hall | Maelor South; SJ4617536014; 52°55′07″N 2°48′02″W | 1 February 2022 | Garden | Gardens The part walled and part earthwork remains of a Tudor/Jacobean terraced garden. | II | PGW(C)56(WRE) | Bettisfield Hall Farm, with a house at the centre and a path towards it. |
| Brynkinalt | Chirk; SJ3021838023; 52°56′05″N 3°02′18″W | 1 February 2022 | Park and gardens | Park Large picturesque landscape park; formal and informal pleasure gardens, laid out in the nineteenth century and providing the setting to the house and its gardens. | II* | PGW(C)15(WRE) | Brynkinalt Hall towards its front entrance. |
| Chirk Castle | Glyntraian; SJ2676638102; 52°56′06″N 3°05′23″W | 1 February 2022 | Parks and gardens | Gardens It is registered for its outstanding landscape park, partly designed by William Emes, and its terraced and informal garden which includes remains from the medieval period onwards, all set in a fine elevated position. | I | PGW(C)63(WRE) | Garden footpath at Chirk Castle |
| Erbistock Hall | Erbistock; SJ3500142495; 52°58′32″N 2°58′05″W | 1 February 2022 | Park and gardens | Park and Gardens Park with formal elements; formal, partly terraced, part walled garden probably dating to the early eighteenth century, with well-preserved, very fine yew hedging and topiary of some antiquity. | II | PGW(C)73(WRE) | Erbistock Hall |
| Erddig | Marchwiel; SJ3249648275; 53°01′38″N 3°00′24″W | 1 February 2022 | Park and gardens | Park An early eighteenth century grand formal garden in the Dutch style set within an eighteenth-century park designed by the landscape designer William Emes for Philip Yorke. The park includes an unusual water feature, the cup and saucer, designed by Emes in 1774. The registered park and garden has important group value with the listed house and the many listed estate buildings, parkland features and garden structures on the Erddig estate. | I | PGW(C)62(WRE) | Gardens at Erddig |
| Gredington Park | Hanmer; SJ4448138649; 52°56′31″N 2°49′35″W | 1 February 2022 | Park and gardens | Landscaped park Medium-sized landscape park; informal garden with some formal elements; Japanese garden; and walled kitchen gardens. | II | PGW(C)57(WRE) | Lodge, among trees, at the entrance to a country house |
| Horsley Hall | Gresford; SJ3648055199; 53°05′24″N 2°56′55″W | 1 February 2022 | Garden | Terraced garden Survival of the structure of an extensive Edwardian garden, with some massive rockwork and a few fine ornamental trees. | II | PGW(C)59(WRE) | Lodge, among trees, at the entrance to a country house |
| Iscoyd Park | Bronington; SJ5036642017; 52°58′22″N 2°44′21″W | 1 February 2022 | Park and gardens | Park Small but intact eighteenth-century park with its fine specimen trees. Group value with the Grade II* Listed hall, Iscoyd Park. | II | PGW(C)16(WRE) | Red perimeter wall of Iscoyd Park |
| Pen-y-lan | Ruabon; SJ3281541109; 52°57′46″N 3°00′01″W | 1 February 2022 | Park and gardens | Landscaped park Well-preserved landscape park in an unspoilt rural location. Group value with the listed Pen-y-lan Hall. | II | PGW(C)52(WRE) | engraving of a country house standing in a park |
| Rosehill | Erbistock; SJ3483942872; 52°58′44″N 2°58′14″W | 1 February 2022 | Park and gardens | Landscaped park Late eighteenth to early nineteenth-century landscape park, with formal gardens including the a box-edged Edwardian parterre and a well-preserved walled kitchen garden. Group value with the late Georgian house. | II | PGW(C)72(WRE) | |
| St. Mary's Churchyard, Overton | Overton; SJ3724241848; 52°58′12″N 2°56′05″W | 1 February 2022 | Churchyard | Churchyard Churchyard of St Mary’s Church, surrounded by red sandstone wall. Its ancient yews are one of the Seven Wonders of Wales. | II | PGW(C)8(WRE) | St Mary's Churchyard in Overton and one of its Yew Trees. |
| Trevalyn Hall | Rossett; SJ3641256832; 53°06′17″N 2°57′00″W | 1 February 2022 | Deer park, orchard and formal garden | Parks and gardens Remains of sixteenth- or seventeenth-century deer parks, an embanked orchard, a walled garden and a well-preserved nineteenth-century topiary. Group value with Grade II* Listed Trevalyn Hall and its listed courtyard. | II | PGW(C)26(WRE) | Trevalyn Hall from a nearby field. |
| Trevalyn House | Rossett; SJ3668656528; 53°06′07″N 2°56′45″W | 1 February 2022 | Gardens | Formal garden Nineteenth-century pleasure grounds, with a rockery and some fine mature trees, both coniferous and deciduous, and well-preserved kitchen garden walls. Group value with the Grade II Listed house. | II* | PGW(C)74(WRE) | Trevalyn House |
| Whitehurst | Chirk; SJ2871440043; 52°57′10″N 3°03′40″W | 1 February 2022 | Garden | Garden Seventeenth-century walled garden of Chirk Castle, and was laid out by Sir Thomas Myddleton II (1586-1666) of Chirk Castle as a pleasure garden in about 1651. | II* | PGW(C)11(WRE) | Looking to Bryn-yr-Eos houses, with Whitehurst gardens in the distance. |
| Wrexham Cemetery | Offa, Wrexham; SJ3252149631; 53°02′22″N 3°00′23″W | 1 February 2022 | Garden cemetery | Gardens Victorian walled garden cemetery, group value with the listed cemetery chapel, lodge, gates, gate piers and railings. | II | PGW(C)67(WRE) | Tombstones in Wrexham Cemetery |
| Wynnstay | Ruabon; SJ3079942637; 52°58′35″N 3°01′51″W | 1 February 2022 | Park and gardens | Landscaped park Nineteenth-century landscape park, informal garden and terrace garden, attached to the estate mansion and situated on high ground near Ruabon, extending down to the River Dee. | I | PGW(C)64(WRE) | Hills near Wynnstay and its lake |

== See also ==
- List of scheduled monuments in Wrexham County Borough
- Grade I listed buildings in Wrexham County Borough
- Grade II* listed buildings in Wrexham County Borough
