= Llanarth Court =

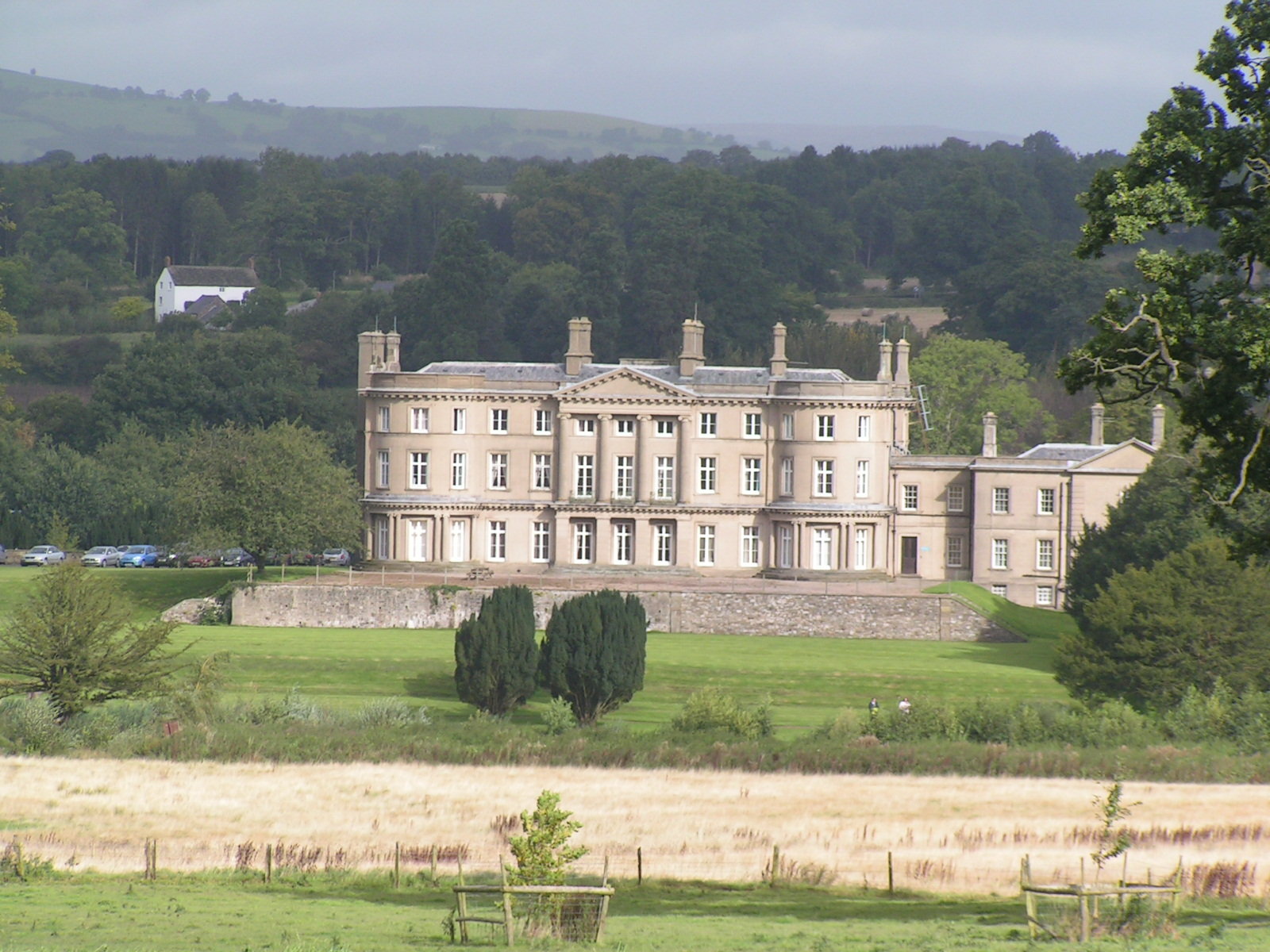
- "A monster Neo-classical house"

- Location within Monmouthshire
- 51.7894°N 2.8995°W
- Type: House
- Location: Llanarth, Monmouthshire

History
- Built: 1771 and rebuilt 1849-51

Site notes
- Architect(s): W. and E. Habershon (rebuilding)
- Architectural style: Neo-classical
- Governing body: Priory Group

Listed Building – Grade II*
- Official name: Llanarth Court
- Designated: 6 May 1952
- Reference no.: 1925

Listed Building – Grade II
- Official name: Gatehouse at Llanarth Court
- Designated: 3 January 1995
- Reference no.: 15661

Listed Building – Grade II
- Official name: Gates and Piers to former north drive to Llanarth Court
- Designated: 15 March 2000
- Reference no.: 22994

Cadw/ICOMOS Register of Parks and Gardens of Special Historic Interest in Wales
- Official name: Llanarth Court
- Designated: 1 February 2022
- Reference no.: PGW(Gt)13(Mon)
- Listing: Grade II

Llanarth Court is a late-18th-century country house with substantial 19th-century alterations in Llanarth, Monmouthshire, Wales. The court was built for the Jones family of Treowen and was subsequently the home of Ivor Herbert, 1st Baron Treowen, whose family still owns much of the Llanarth estate, although not the court itself. The court is a Grade II* listed building and is now a private hospital. The gardens are included on the Cadw/ICOMOS Register of Parks and Gardens of Special Historic Interest in Wales.

== History ==
The first house recorded on the property goes back to the early medieval period and was called Hendre obaith, Home of the Old Faith. (Note: Joseph Bradney, in his multi-volume study A History of Monmouthshire from the Coming of the Normans into Wales down to the Present Time, translates Hendre-obaith as "the old home of hope". He goes on to record the descent of the Joneses of Llanarth Court back to Gwilym ap Jenkyn of Wern-duu who died in 1377.) It came into the possession of ancestors of the Jones family well before 1469. In the late 16th and early 17th centuries, it was the home of Philip Jones, merchant and member of parliament for Monmouth Boroughs. His family subsequently rebuilt the house as Llanarth Court in the seventeenth century.

The current house was originally built around 1770 for John Jones. It was remodelled 1849–51 by Edward Habershon and his brother, W. G. Habershon, in an Italianate style. Lord Treowen, the ennobled descendant of the Joneses, died in 1933 and, his only son having predeceased him, (Note: Lord Treowen's son, Elydir John Bernard Herbert, was killed shortly after fighting at the Third Battle of Gaza, in December 1917. His parents built a small hamlet, Tre Elydir, on their adjoining Llanover estate, in his memory.) the court was inherited by his daughter, the Hon. Fflorens Roch, who gave it to the Roman Catholic Church in 1948. The church passed the court to the Dominican Order which ran a school there, Blackfriars School, until 1967. The Benedictine Order then took over the building, operating a preparatory school for Belmont Abbey School. The school closed in 1986 and the court was sold to AMI Healthcare for conversion into a private hospital. The hospital is currently run by the Priory Group and caters for patients with mental illness or intellectual disabilities. A fire at the court in late April 2020 saw no loss of life, but the destruction of a modern ward. The court itself was undamaged.

== Description ==
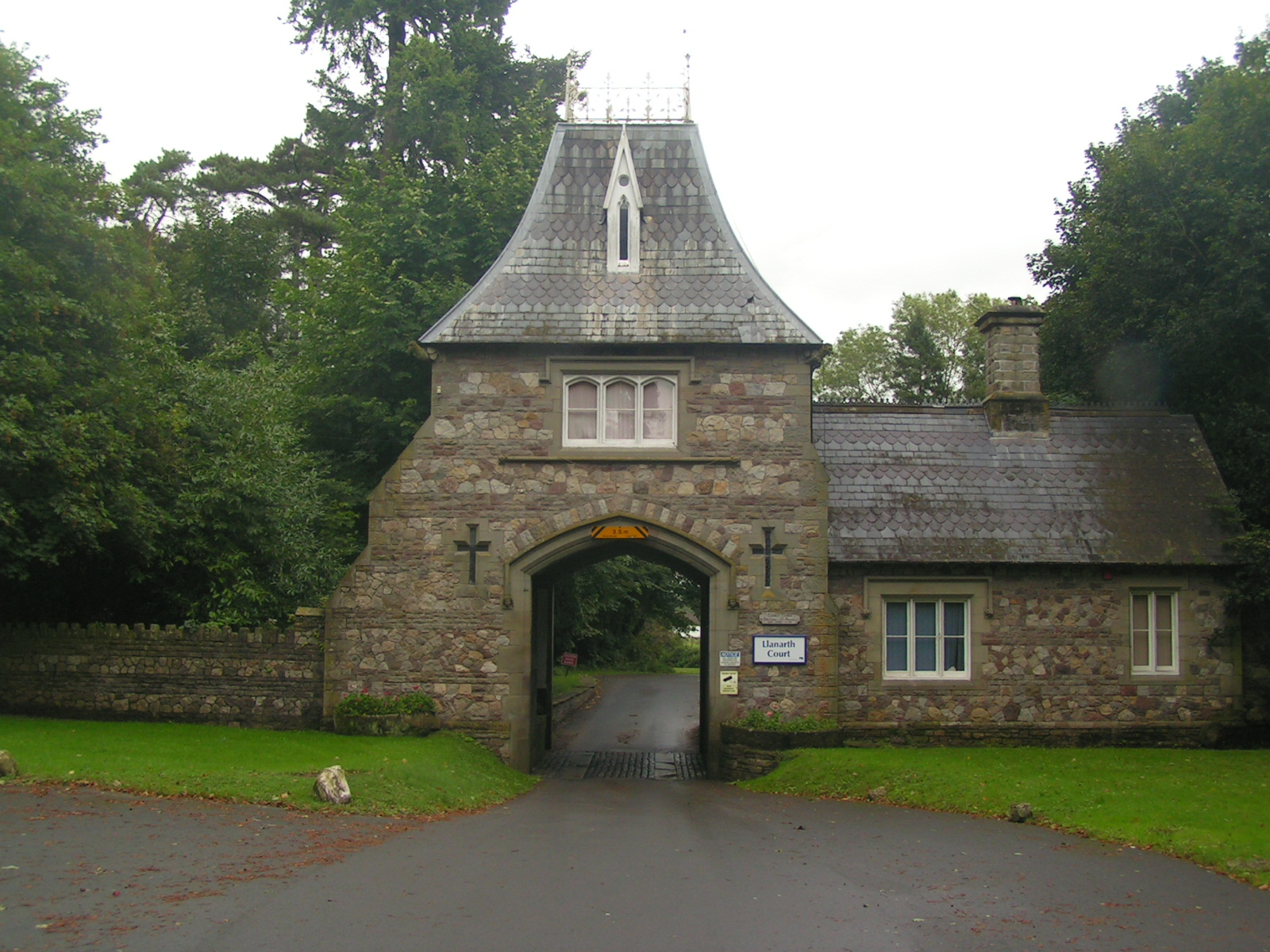
The gatehouse on the southwest drive

The architectural historian John Newman describes the court as a "monster Neo-classical house", consisting of a three-storey, double pile block of thirteen bays. The entrance porch, reputedly modelled on the temple at Paestum, has been removed. The Habershons' work included the rendering and much classical decoration. The interior has been modernised and institutionalised and contains "little of either the later eighteenth or the mid-nineteenth centuries". The Monmouthshire author and artist Fred Hando, recording a visit to the court in the 1960s, noted the presence of two pictures by Tiepolo, The Healing at the Pool of Siloam and The Woman taken in Adultery. The latter is now in the collection of Amgueddfa Cymru – Museum Wales. The court used to contain the original hall screen from Treowen, but, writing in 1999, Newman stated that the screen "is likely to be returned thither", a view which echoed that of Hando, writing 30 years earlier; "The oak screen dated 1627 was transferred from Treowen where, in my opinion, it would be more happily housed".

The gardens surrounding the court are a "well preserved early 19th century landscape park". It is possible that the landscape gardeners Samuel Lapidge and John Claudius Loudon were involved in its design. Developments after World War II significantly altered the landscape and many features have been lost, including the kitchen garden dating from the 19th century, and the lake, which is now silted-up. The gardens are listed at Grade II on the Cadw/ICOMOS Register of Parks and Gardens of Special Historic Interest in Wales. The Church of St Mary and St Michael, originally the private chapel for the court, stands in the grounds and has its own Grade II* Listing. The gatehouse to the southwest of the court, and the gates and gate piers to the north have their own Grade II listings.

== Sources ==
- Bradney, Joseph Alfred (1992a) [1906]. The Hundred of Abergavenny, second part. A History of Monmouthshire from the Coming of the Normans into Wales down to the Present Time Volume 1, Part 2b. Academy Books. ISBN 9781873361139. OCLC 60103879.
- Hando, Fred (1964). Here and There in Monmouthshire. Newport: R.H.Johns Ltd. OCLC 30295639.
- Monmouthshire, County Council (2013). Llanarth Conservation Area Appraisal & Management Proposals (PDF). Forum Heritage Services.
- Newman, John (2000). Gwent/Monmouthshire. The Buildings of Wales. Penguin. ISBN 0-14-071053-1.
