= Treowen =

17th-century house in Wales

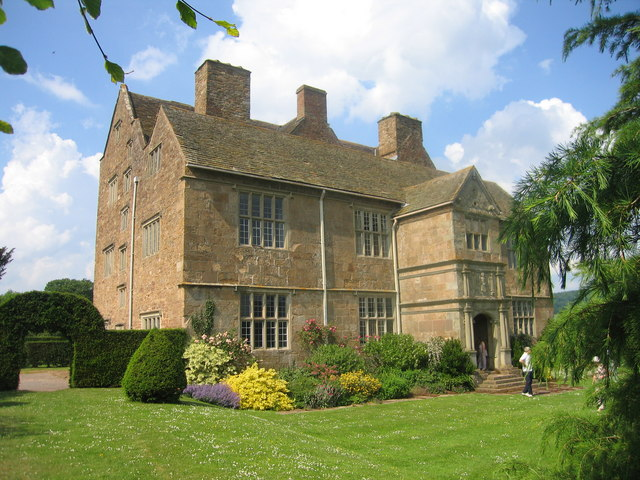
- "a very magnificent building"

- Location within Monmouthshire
- 51.796°N 2.7822°W
- Type: House
- Location: Dingestow, Monmouthshire, Wales

History
- Built: 1615-1627
- Built for: William Jones

Site notes
- Architectural style: Vernacular
- Governing body: Privately owned

Listed Building – Grade I
- Official name: Tre-Owen
- Designated: 1 May 1952
- Reference no.: 2065

Cadw/ICOMOS Register of Parks and Gardens of Special Historic Interest in Wales
- Official name: Treowen
- Designated: 1 February 2022
- Reference no.: PGW(Gt)22(Mon)
- Listing: Grade II

Treowen (or Tre-owen) is an early 17th-century house in Monmouthshire, Wales, regarded as "the most important gentry house (of its date) in the county". It is located in open countryside within the parish of Wonastow, about ½ mile (1 km) north-east of the village of Dingestow, and 3 miles (4.8 km) south-west of Monmouth. After being used as a farmhouse for three centuries, Treowen now operates as a conference and functions venue and holds the annual Wye Valley Chamber Music Festival. It is a Grade I listed building, and its gardens are designated Grade II on the Cadw/ICOMOS Register of Parks and Gardens of Special Historic Interest in Wales.

== History ==
There is something very moving about the distant view of Treowen, rising suddenly, high and lonely, out of the fields. It has no park, for it has been a farm since the 17th century, but the lack of elaborate setting suits its character. It is not a sophisticated building but strong, massive and generous. The depredations of time and fallen fortune have removed a good deal, but nothing has been added: everything that is there is genuine, unaltered work of its age. - Mark Girouard, 1960

The house was built in about 1623–27 for William Jones, on the site of a 15th-century building. Jones was briefly Member of Parliament for Monmouthshire in 1614, and was High Sheriff of Monmouthshire in 1615. He later inherited a fortune from his uncle, a trader in London.

The Jones family moved out of the house in the 1670s, and let it out as a farmhouse. The building itself remained largely unchanged except for the removal of the top storey of the front half of the building in the 18th century. The house was sold to the sitting tenants in 1945, and continued to be used as a farmhouse until 1993. In 1960, the architectural historian Mark Girouard described the house in an article in Country Life (see quote box). The grounds of the house contain the remains of what is said to be a Tudor garden, including a rectangular earthwork on the north side of the house, a walkway and ornamental fishponds.

The house is now used as a centre for conferences and holidays, and as a venue for weddings and other functions. It has also been used in the filming of TV programmes, including Doctor Who. Treowen is home to the annual Wye Valley Chamber Music Festival, held annually in January and July.

== Architecture and description ==
The architectural historian John Newman considers Treowen the "most important 17th century gentry house" in Monmouthshire. It is constructed to a double-pile plan and built of Old Red Sandstone, with caramel-coloured ashlar blocks and green Bridgend sandstone dressings. The house was very large by local standards of the time, and commanded extensive views. Newman wrote that "as originally built, the height of the house must have been as daunting as the sheer repetitiveness of its design". The originally austere façade was altered early in its history by the addition of a porch, with a "classical frontispiece of distressing crudity", and the Jones shield.

Inside the house, the ground floor rooms rise to a height of 17 feet (5.2 m). There is an oak panelled room with plaster ceiling and Jacobean fireplace, and a great staircase of 72 stairs, the earliest datable open-well staircase in Monmouthshire. This great, or banqueting, hall originally held "a handsomely-carved screen" but the Monmouthshire antiquarian Joseph Bradney, in his multi-volume A History of Monmouthshire from the Coming of the Normans into Wales down to the Present Time, records that the screen was moved to Llanarth Court, another Herbert property, in 1898. Newman, writing in 2000, stated that the screen "is likely to be returned", a view which echoed that of Fred Hando who, writing 30 years earlier, stated; "the oak screen dated 1627 was transferred from Treowen where, in my opinion, it would be more happily housed".

In his study, Houses of the Welsh Countryside, (published 1975, second edition 1988), Peter Smith concludes Treowen "is indeed a very magnificent building". Tyerman and Warner, in Arthur Mee's multi-volume study The King's England, describe it as "one of the finest houses in all Monmouthshire". Treowen is a Grade I listed building. The gardens, which contain remnants of the original Tudor terracing, are designated Grade II on the Cadw/ICOMOS Register of Parks and Gardens of Special Historic Interest in Wales.

== Sources ==
- Bradney, Joseph (1991). A History of Monmouthshire: The Hundred of Skenfrith, Volume 1 Part 1. Academy Books. ISBN 1873361092. OCLC 669714197.
- Hando, Fred (1964). Here and There in Monmouthshire. Newport: R.H.Johns Ltd. OCLC 30295639.
- Newman, John (2000). Gwent/Monmouthshire. The Buildings of Wales. London: Penguin. ISBN 0-14-071053-1.
- Smith, Peter (1988). Houses of the Welsh Countryside. London: Her Majesty's Stationery Office. ISBN 9-78011-300012-8.
- Tyerman, Hugo; Warner, Sydney (1951). Arthur Mee (ed.). Monmouthshire. The King's England. London: Hodder and Staughton. OCLC 764861.
