= Upper Red House, Llanvihangel-Ystern-Llewern =

Upper Red House
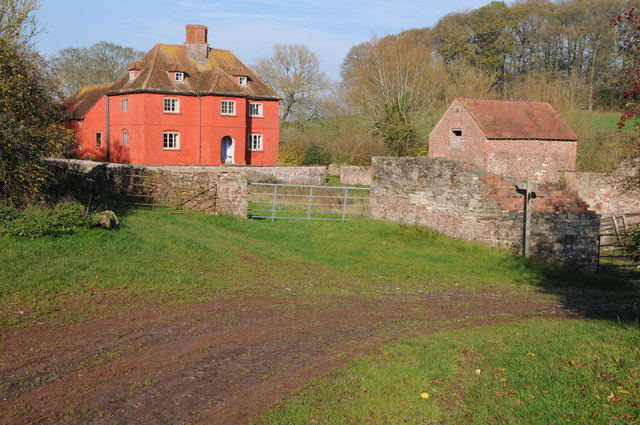
- Upper Red House

- Location within Monmouthshire
- 51.8132°N 2.8312°W
- Type: Farmhouse
- Location: Llanvihangel-Ystern-Llewern, Monmouthshire, Wales

History
- Built: Late 17th century

Site notes
- Architectural style: Vernacular
- Governing body: Private

Listed Building – Grade II*
- Official name: Upper Red House
- Designated: 9 April 1991
- Reference no.: 2855

Upper Red House is a farmhouse in Llanvihangel-Ystern-Llewern, Monmouthshire, Wales, dating from the late 17th century. Located about one kilometre south-west of the parish church, the building remains little altered since its construction, although it underwent restoration during the 20th and 21st centuries. It is designated a Grade II* listed building.

== History and description ==
The architectural historian John Newman, in his Gwent/Monmouthshire volume of the Pevsner Buildings of Wales series, describes the house as having two storeys and three bays, beneath a hipped roof. He characterises the style as "Renaissance", with a centrally positioned chimney stack, a feature considered "rare" in Monmouthshire.

The building is constructed of English bond brick, colour-washed in red. It is designated a Grade II* listed building by Cadw. The Royal Commission on the Ancient and Historical Monuments of Wales (RCAHMW) maintains an extensive photographic archive of the house.
