= Registered historic parks and gardens in Torfaen =

List of buildings in county borough of Wales

Torfaen shown within Wales

Torfaen is a county borough in south-east Wales. It covers an area of 126 km^{2} (49 sq mi). In 2021 the population was approximately 92,300.

The Cadw/ICOMOS Register of Parks and Gardens of Special Historic Interest in Wales was established in 2002 and given statutory status in 2022. It is administered by Cadw, the historic environment agency of the Welsh Government. Elisabeth Whittle described Cadw as having a "somewhat special and guiding role" in the preservation of historic parks and gardens, since they are "an integral part of Welsh archaeological and architectural heritage". The register includes just under 400 sites, ranging from gardens of private houses, to cemeteries and public parks. Parks and gardens are listed at one of three grades, matching the grading system used for listed buildings. Grade I is the highest grade, for sites of exceptional interest; Grade II*, the next highest, denotes parks and gardens of great quality; while Grade II denotes sites of special interest.

There are two registered parks and gardens in Torfaen County Borough, Pontypool Park and Llantarnam Abbey. The former is listed at Grade II* and the latter at Grade II.

== Key ==
Grade	Criteria
I	Parks and gardens of exceptional interest
II*	Parks and gardens of great quality
II	Parks and gardens of special interest

== List of parks and gardens ==
List of parks and gardens
Name	Location Grid Ref. (Note: Sometimes known as OSGB36, the grid reference is based on the British national grid reference system used by the Ordnance Survey.) Geo-coordinates	Date Listed	Description / Notes	Grade	Reference Number	Image
Pontypool Park	Pontypool; SO283010; 51°42′14″N 3°02′20″W	1 February 2022	Park and country house garden	II*	PGW(Gt)26(TOR)	A corner of parkland with trees
Llantarnam Abbey	Llantarnam; ST311929; 51°37′51″N 2°59′46″W	1 February 2022	Country house garden	II	PGW(Gt)25(TOR)	a large stone building set in a park

== See also ==
- List of scheduled monuments in Torfaen
- Grade I listed buildings in Torfaen
- Grade II* listed buildings in Torfaen

== Sources ==
- Whittle, Elisabeth (1992). The Historic Gardens of Wales. Cardiff: CADW. ISBN 9780117015784.
