= Dewstow House =

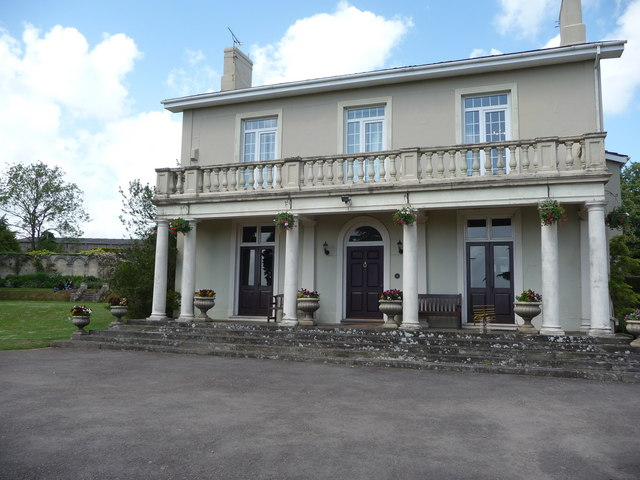

- Location within Wales
- 51.5958°N 2.7683°W
- Type: House
- Location: Caerwent, Monmouthshire

History
- Built: C.1800

Site notes
- Architectural style: Georgian
- Governing body: Privately owned

Cadw/ICOMOS Register of Parks and Gardens of Special Historic Interest in Wales
- Official name: Dewstow House Garden
- Designated: 1 February 2022
- Reference no.: PGW(Gt)44(Mon)
- Listing: Grade I

Listed Building – Grade II
- Official name: Dewstow House
- Designated: 28 October 1976
- Reference no.: 23039

Listed Building – Grade II*
- Official name: Grotto to the SE of the house
- Designated: 29 March 2000
- Reference no.: 23059

Listed Building – Grade II*
- Official name: Terrace, wall, grotto and underground garden to the NW of the house
- Designated: 29 March 2000
- Reference no.: 23060

Listed Building – Grade II*
- Official name: Grotto, underground garden and bridge to the W of the house
- Designated: 29 March 2000
- Reference no.: 23061

Dewstow House, Caldicot, Monmouthshire, Wales, is an early nineteenth century villa in a Neoclassical style. The house is notable as the site of "one of the strangest gardens in Wales." The building itself is plain; described by architectural writer John Newman as a "simple three-bay villa", it has extensive views over the Severn Estuary. The house is a Grade II listed building, while the garden is listed at the highest grade, Grade I, on the Cadw/ICOMOS Register of Parks and Gardens of Special Historic Interest in Wales.

== History and description ==
Dewstow House is a simple, two-storey villa. It is notable for its "network of very rare and unusual underground gardens" constructed in the late nineteenth and early twentieth centuries. Comprising "underground passages and top-light chambers with artificial rock-work and stalactites," the garden structures have three separate Grade II* listings as a result of their importance.

After the death of the garden's creator, Harry Oakley, in 1940, the gardens were gradually abandoned. In the 1960s, during the construction of the M4 motorway and the Severn Bridge, soil from these sites was used to fill in the grottoes and pools. The gardens were rediscovered, excavated and restored at the beginning of the twenty first century and were opened to the public. At the end of the 2024 season, the owners announced that Dewstow would be permanently closed. The gardens They are registered Grade I on the Cadw/ICOMOS Register of Parks and Gardens of Special Historic Interest in Wales.

== Gallery ==
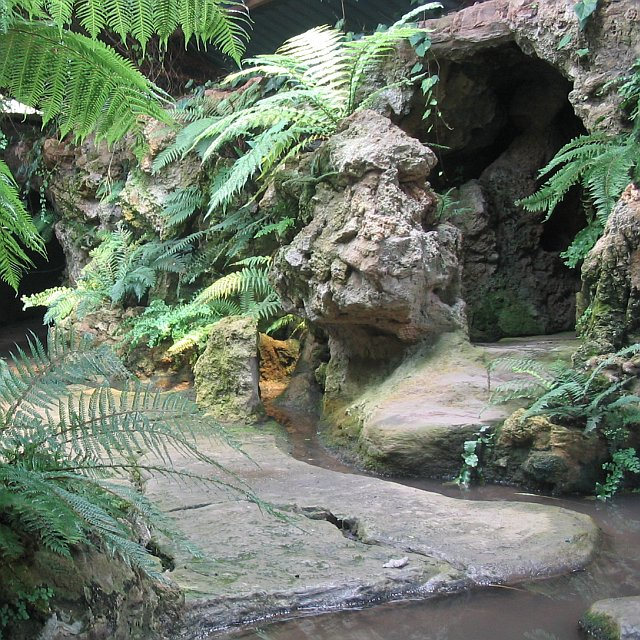

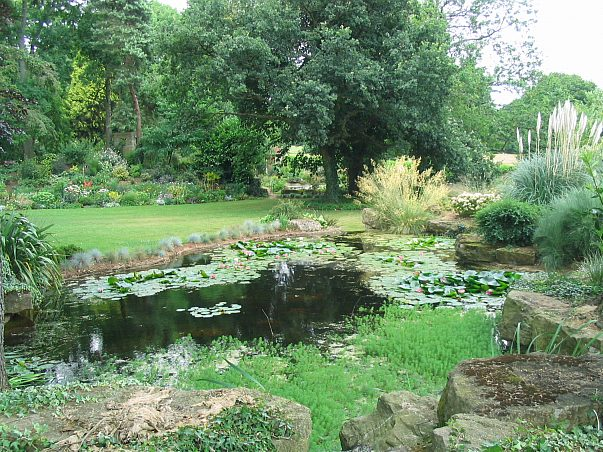

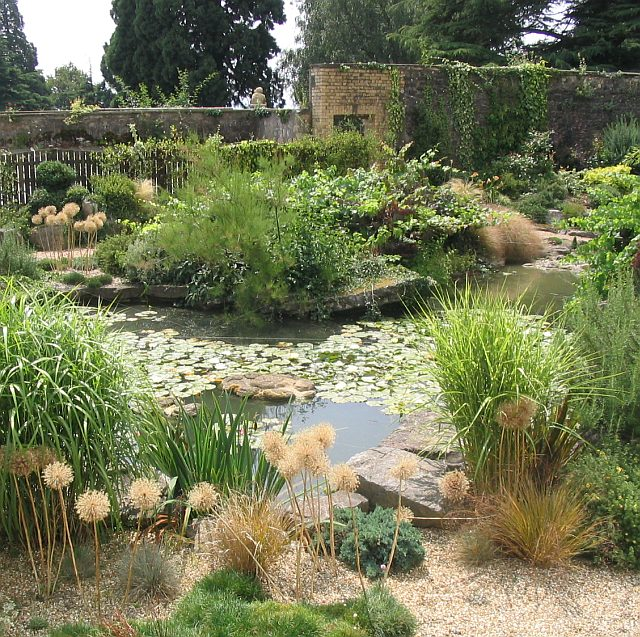

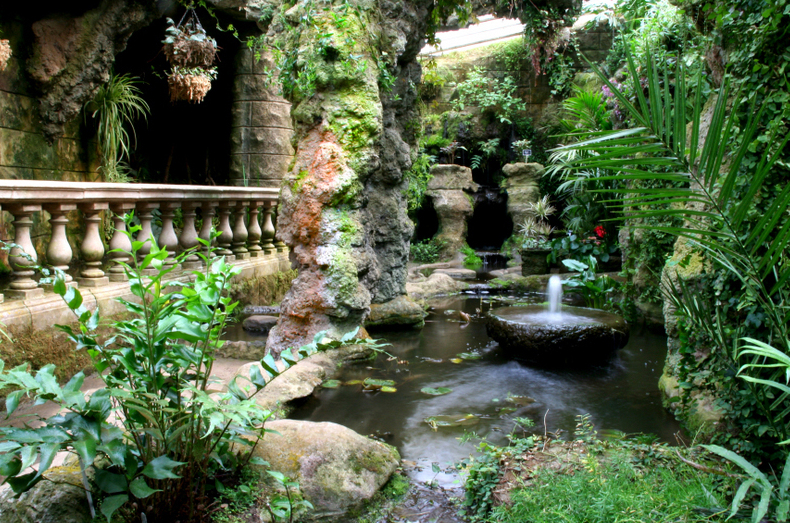

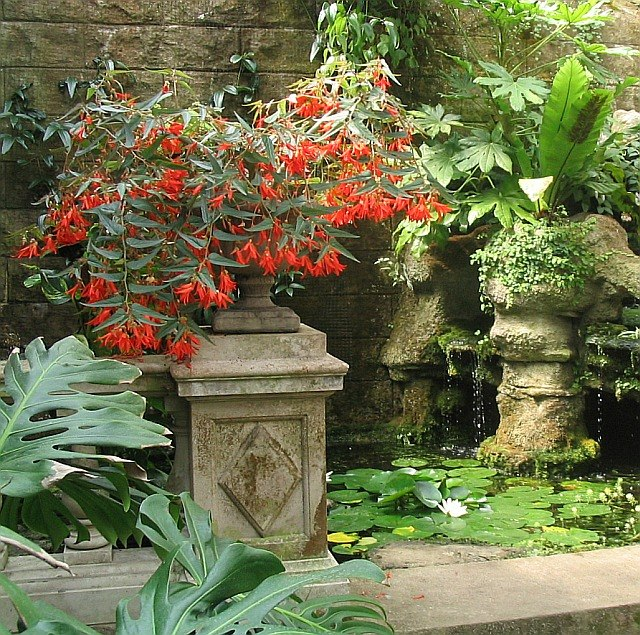

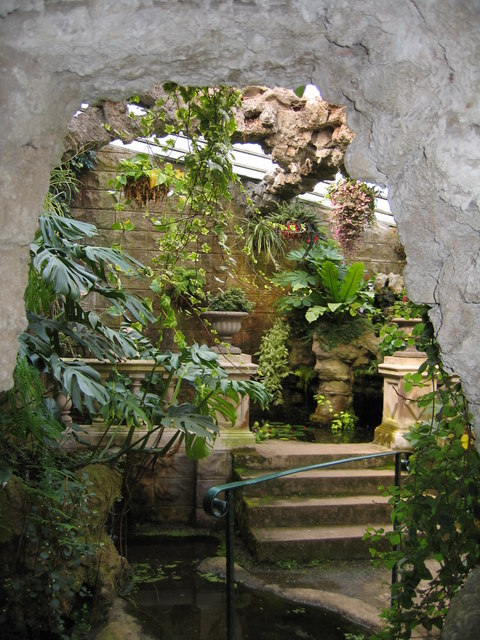

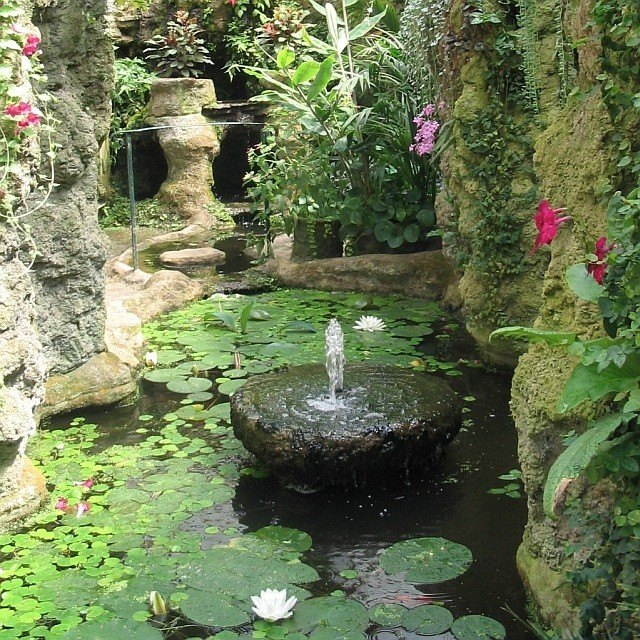

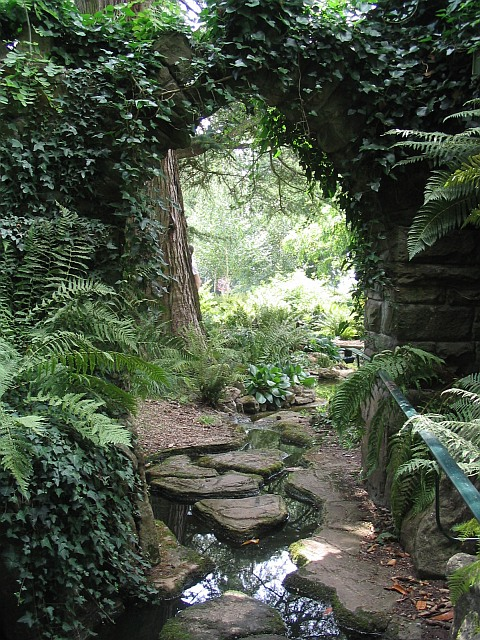

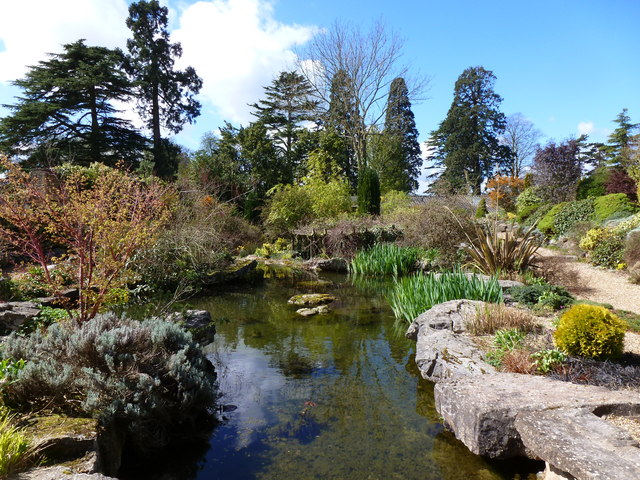

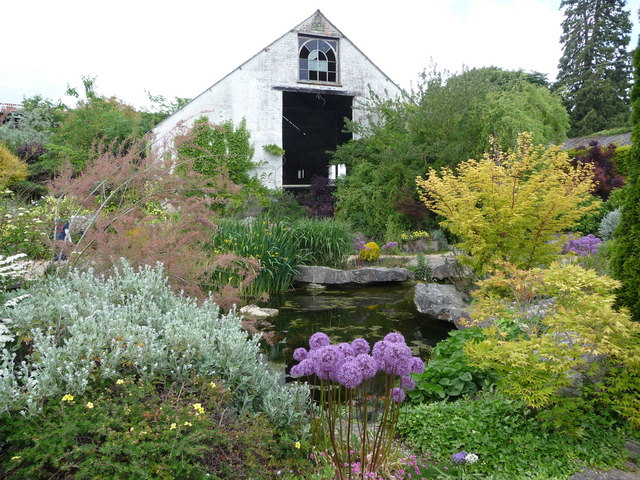
