= Tal-y-coed Court =

Tal-y-Coed Court
- The gatehouse to Tal-y-coed Court

- Location within Monmouthshire
- 51.8325°N 2.84126°W
- Type: House
- Location: Llanvihangel-Ystern-Llewern, Monmouthshire

History
- Built: 1881

Site notes
- Architect: F. R. Kempson
- Architectural style: British Queen Anne Revival
- Governing body: Privately owned

Listed Building – Grade II*
- Official name: Tal-y-coed Court
- Designated: 6 January 1988
- Reference no.: 2787

Cadw/ICOMOS Register of Parks and Gardens of Special Historic Interest in Wales
- Official name: Talycoed Court
- Designated: 1 February 2022
- Reference no.: PGW(Gt)52(Mon)
- Listing: Grade II*

Listed Building – Grade II
- Official name: Former Stables & Clock House
- Designated: 6 January 1988
- Reference no.: 2788

Listed Building – Grade II
- Official name: Lodge at Main Entrance to Tal-y-coed Court
- Designated: 6 January 1988
- Reference no.: 2790

Listed Building – Grade II
- Official name: Gatepiers, Piers and Walls at Main Entrance to Tal-y-coed Court
- Designated: 27 October 2000
- Reference no.: 24324

Tal-y-coed Court,, Llanvihangel-Ystern-Llewern, Monmouthshire, Wales, is a Victorian country house. Constructed in 1881–1883, it was built for the Monmouthshire antiquarian Joseph Bradney, author of A History of Monmouthshire from the Coming of the Normans into Wales down to the Present Time. A Grade II* listed building, the house is a "fine historicist essay in the Queen Anne Style, one of the earliest examples in Wales." Its gardens and park are designated Grade II on the Cadw/ICOMOS Register of Parks and Gardens of Special Historic Interest in Wales.

== History ==
Colonel Sir Joseph Alfred Bradney, FSA, BA, JP, DL was a soldier who acquired the estate at Tal-y-Coed through purchase and inheritance. In 1881, aged 22, he commissioned F. R. Kempson to build the house on the site of Llanvihangel Hall, which had been part of the estate of Crawshay Bailey. The house cost £10,000, reflecting Bradney's status as High Sheriff of Monmouthshire.

The court, and its stables, are now sub-divided into a number of private residences. The stables and clock tower are designated Grade II, as is the lodge at the entrance to the court. A project is underway (2019) to restore an elaborate horse trough constructed for Bradney on the road from Llantilio Crossenny to Monmouth. The trough also has a Grade II listing. The court's parkland is recorded as a "small late 19th century park and terraced garden".

== Description ==
The house is in a Queen Anne style, which John Newman describes as "not at all what one would expect in South Wales at that date." It is constructed of red brick with ashlar dressings and a brick plinth. Of five bays, it has a large, hipped roof with "lofty dormer windows and high chimneystacks." The interior is "virtually intact and (...) of exceptionally high quality". The gardens and park, laid out by Bradney in the late 19th century, are designated Grade II on the Cadw/ICOMOS Register of Parks and Gardens of Special Historic Interest in Wales.

== Sources ==
- Newman, John (1995). Gwent/Monmouthshire. The Buildings of Wales. London, UK: Penguin. ISBN 0-14-071053-1.
