= Milgatw =

Farmhouse in Blaenau Gwent, Wales

- Location within Blaenau Gwent
- 51.7969°N 3.259°W
- Type: Farmhouse
- Location: Blaen-y-cwm, Tredegar, Blaenau Gwent

History
- Built: 16th and 17th centuries

Site notes
- Architectural style: Vernacular
- Owner: Privately owned

Listed Building – Grade II*
- Official name: Milgatw Farmhouse
- Designated: 14 October 1999
- Reference no.: 22494

Listed Building – Grade II
- Official name: Agricultural range at Milgatw
- Designated: 14 October 1999
- Reference no.: 22495

Milgatw Farmhouse is situated at Blaen-y-cwm, north of Tredegar in Blaenau Gwent, Wales. Dating mainly from the 16th and 17th centuries, it is thought to have earlier, medieval, origins. The farmhouse is a Grade II* listed building. As of 2025, it is in a state of some dereliction. An adjacent range of agricultural buildings is later, of the mid-19th century, and has its own Grade II listing.

== History and description ==
Milgatw dates mainly from the 16th and 17th centuries, although both Cadw and the Royal Commission on the Ancient and Historical Monuments of Wales consider the building has medieval origins. It comprises a long, low, two-storey main structure, joined to a cow-shed. The building material is local rubble stone, under a modern corrugated iron roof, although traces of the original thatching are still visible. There are two chimneys, one of which supports a small staircase to the upper floor. At the time of the Cadw survey in 1999 the condition of the building was "deteriorating". The RCAHMW Coflein photographic survey indicates the state of dilapidation.

Milgatw has historic importance as a rare survival of a north Monmouthshire upland farmhouse in what was later a heavily industrialised part of the South Wales Valleys. For this reason, it is a Grade II* listed building. The adjacent agricultural range is listed at Grade II.
