= Nantyglo Round Towers =

Coordinates: 51.78525°N 3.17546°W

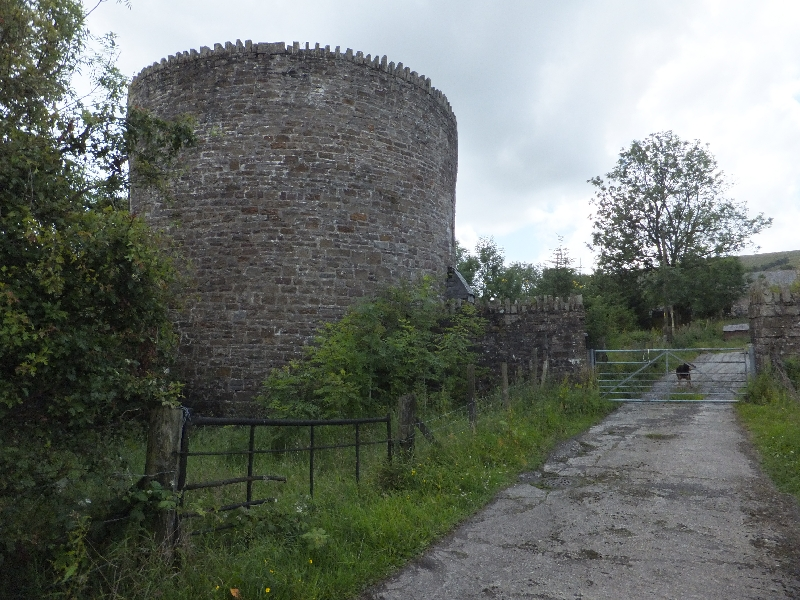
Round tower at Nantyglo

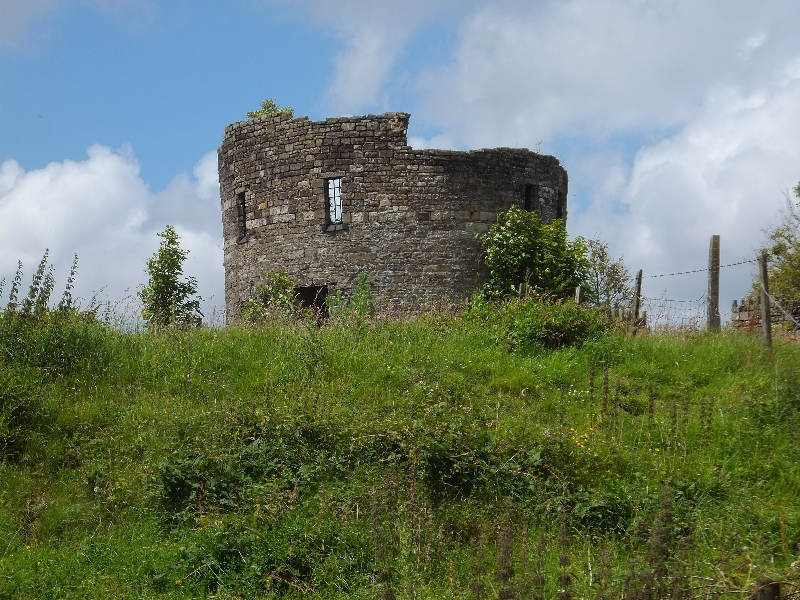
the ruin

Nantyglo Round Towers are located at Roundhouse Farm, Nantyglo, near Brynmawr in the borough of Blaenau Gwent in the South Wales Valleys. The two fortified towers were constructed in the early 19th century as places of retreat by the ironmaster Joseph Bailey, after a riot was caused by his brother's threat to cut wages. They are believed to some of the last privately built defensive fortifications in Britain. One of the towers remains intact today whilst the other is in ruins having been partly demolished to salvage scrap iron in the 1940s.

== History ==
Bailey built the towers after 1816 when some of his workers rioted when his brother, Crawshay Bailey, threatened to cut their wages. Wanting a defensible retreat in case it happened again, Joseph built them at the north-east and south-west corners of a sandstone wall that surrounds Roundhouse Farm, near his mansion Nantyglo House or Ty Mawr. All of the fittings of the towers were made from cast iron and were one of the earliest surviving uses of structural cast iron in Britain. The south-west tower was originally one storey higher than the two-storey north-east tower and served as a residence until the 1930s. The tower was partially demolished during the 1940s to extract the cast iron. The towers were restored in 1986–93 by the Gwent County Council and several other governmental bodies.

== Description ==
The ground floor of the south-west tower is mostly intact, but the walls of the first storey are substantially ruined and the entire second storey is missing as are the cast iron roof, roof trusses and floor joists. These latter have been cut where they join the outer wall. The floors are missing in the north-east tower, but their joists remain and are substantially intact. The roof is intact with its wedge-shaped iron plates. One roof truss had sheared by 2003, but was being supported by interior scaffolding.

Neither is open to the public though they can be viewed from nearby.
