= Llanvihangel-Ystern-Llewern =

Coordinates: 51.821226°N 2.824012°W

Llanvihangel-Ystern-Llewern: Welsh: Llanfihangel Ystum Llewern
- Church of St Michael

- Location within Monmouthshire
- OS grid reference: SO432139
- Community: Whitecastle
- Principal area: Monmouthshire
- Preserved county: Gwent
- Country: Wales
- Sovereign state: United Kingdom
- Post town: MONMOUTH
- Postcode district: NP25
- Dialling code: 01600
- Police: Gwent
- Fire: South Wales
- Ambulance: Welsh
- UK Parliament: Monmouth

Llanvihangel-Ystern-Llewern (Welsh: Llanfihangel Ystum Llewern) is a village in the community of Whitecastle, in Monmouthshire, south east Wales. It is located between Abergavenny and Monmouth and north of Raglan. The River Trothy passes close by.

== History and amenities ==
Joseph Bradney, the antiquarian and author of A History of Monmouthshire from the Coming of the Normans into Wales down to the Present Time, acquired the nearby estate of Tal-y-coed Court, partly by inheritance and partly through purchase, where he settled at an early age. A Latin tablet in St Michael's Church in the village records his achievements. Bradney was also the owner of The Pant in the village, a late-medieval house, with an attached Quaker Meeting House.

The Offa's Dyke Path long distance footpath passes through the village. The village has a parish church dedicated to St. Michael.
