= Llanarth, Monmouthshire =

Llanarth
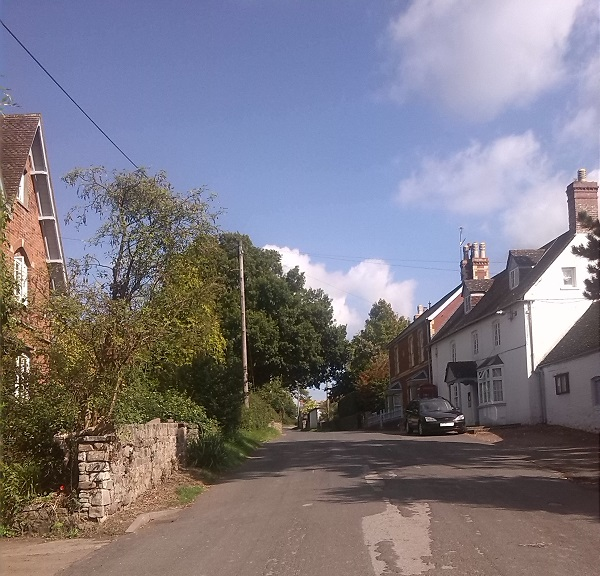
- The main road leading through Llanarth

- Location within Monmouthshire
- Population: 892 (2011)
- OS grid reference: SO375109
- Principal area: Monmouthshire
- Preserved county: Gwent
- Country: Wales
- Sovereign state: United Kingdom
- Post town: USK
- Postcode district: NP15
- Dialling code: 01873
- Police: Gwent
- Fire: South Wales
- Ambulance: Welsh
- UK Parliament: Monmouth
- List of places UK Wales Monmouthshire 51.794°N 2.907°W Map of the community

Llanarth is a privately owned estate village and community within a conservation area in the Welsh county of Monmouthshire. Llanarth is roughly six miles (10 km) east of Abergavenny and four miles (6 km) west of Raglan.

== History ==
One of the earliest mentions of the village is in the Book of Llandaff, written in 1125 CE, where it is rendered with the spelling "Llangarth". The village's name translates as either "church on the ridge of the hill” or possibly “church with a garth (yard)”. Both attest to the presence of a chapel with resident priest (Llan).

Settlement within the area potentially dates back to the 6th century CE. The Book of Llandaff states that the king of Gwent - Iddon son of Ynyr Gwent, gave his mansion of "Llangarth" to Teilo, who was the Bishop of Llandaff between 512 and 566. In 880 a Bishop by the name of Nudd was resident within Llanarth.

The Church of St Teilo in the village stands on the foundation of an older, previous church. In 1891 this church was restored, and for over a century catered to Anglican worshippers. Just over a century later, in 2013, the church was declared redundant, owing to the unsustainable cost of necessary repairs.

The Llanarth estate and its forestry are notable for their numerous coast redwood and giant redwood conifer specimens, which were likely planted in the 19th century following sapling transportation from California.

== Facilities ==
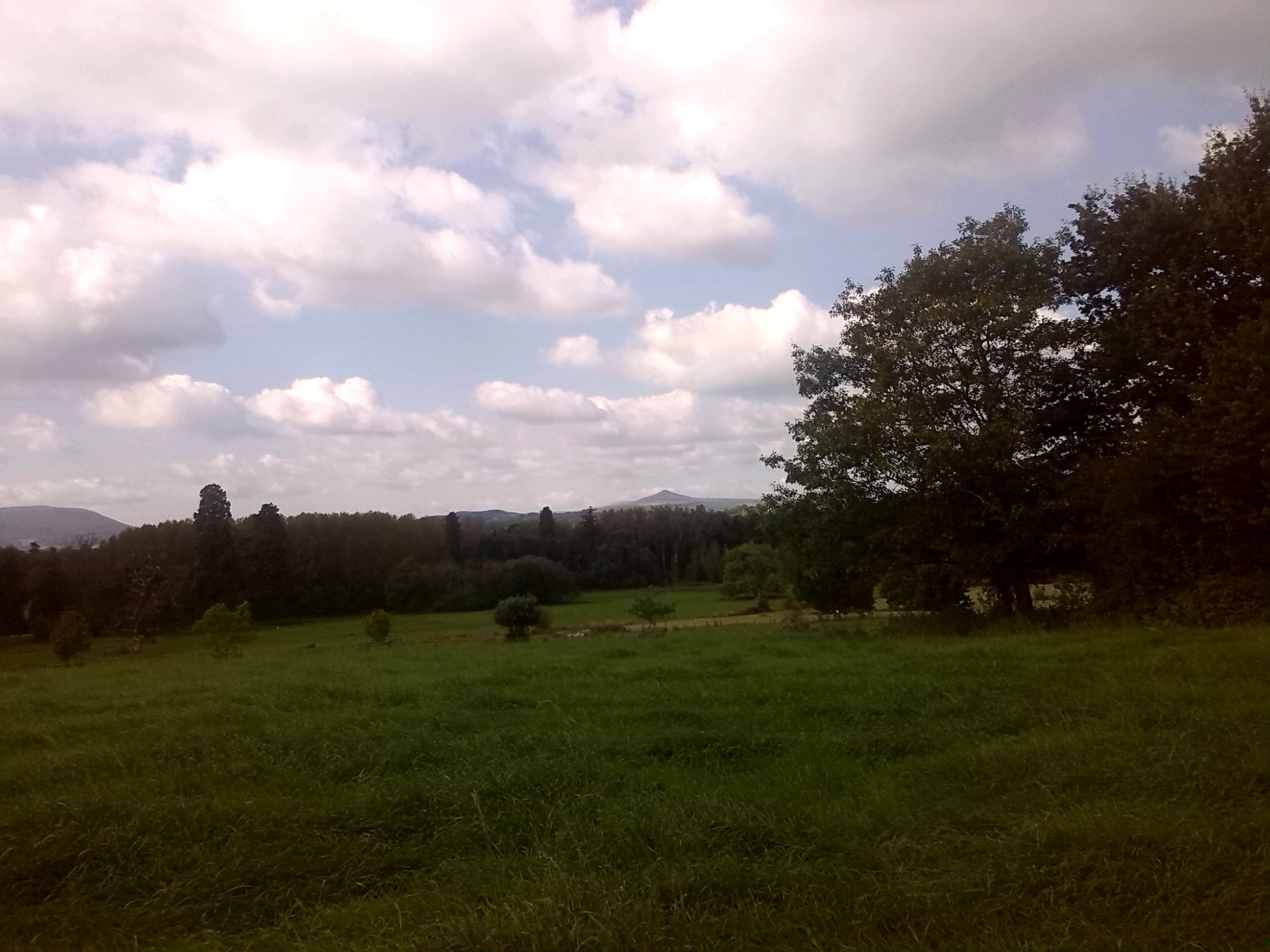
Fields surrounding Llanarth estate; to the left are four giant redwoods, with the Sugar Loaf mountain visible in the centre

Llanarth is surrounded by farmland and forestry which is managed by the Trustees of Llanarth Estate. Within the estate's forestry and land holdings are designated riding bridleways and routes that any horseback rider may use for a nominal fee.

Within the village there is a village hall and sports club with a well-equipped cricket and football pitch, a sports pavilion and a children's play area. Llanarth has a Roman Catholic church, the Church of St Mary and St Michael located within the grounds of Llanarth Court . Primary education is available in Raglan, about three miles away, and secondary education is available in Abergavenny or Monmouth.

Llanarth Court (grid reference SO380105) is also in the vicinity of Llanarth village. Once a private country house of a branch of the Herbert family and home to Ivor Herbert, 1st Baron Treowen, then a fee-paying private boys' school, it is now a private hospital.

== Notable people ==
- Sarah Bill, the mother of Australian prime minister Alfred Deakin, born on a farm in the parish of Llanarth
