= Cadw/ICOMOS Register of Parks and Gardens of Special Historic Interest in Wales =

Heritage register in Wales

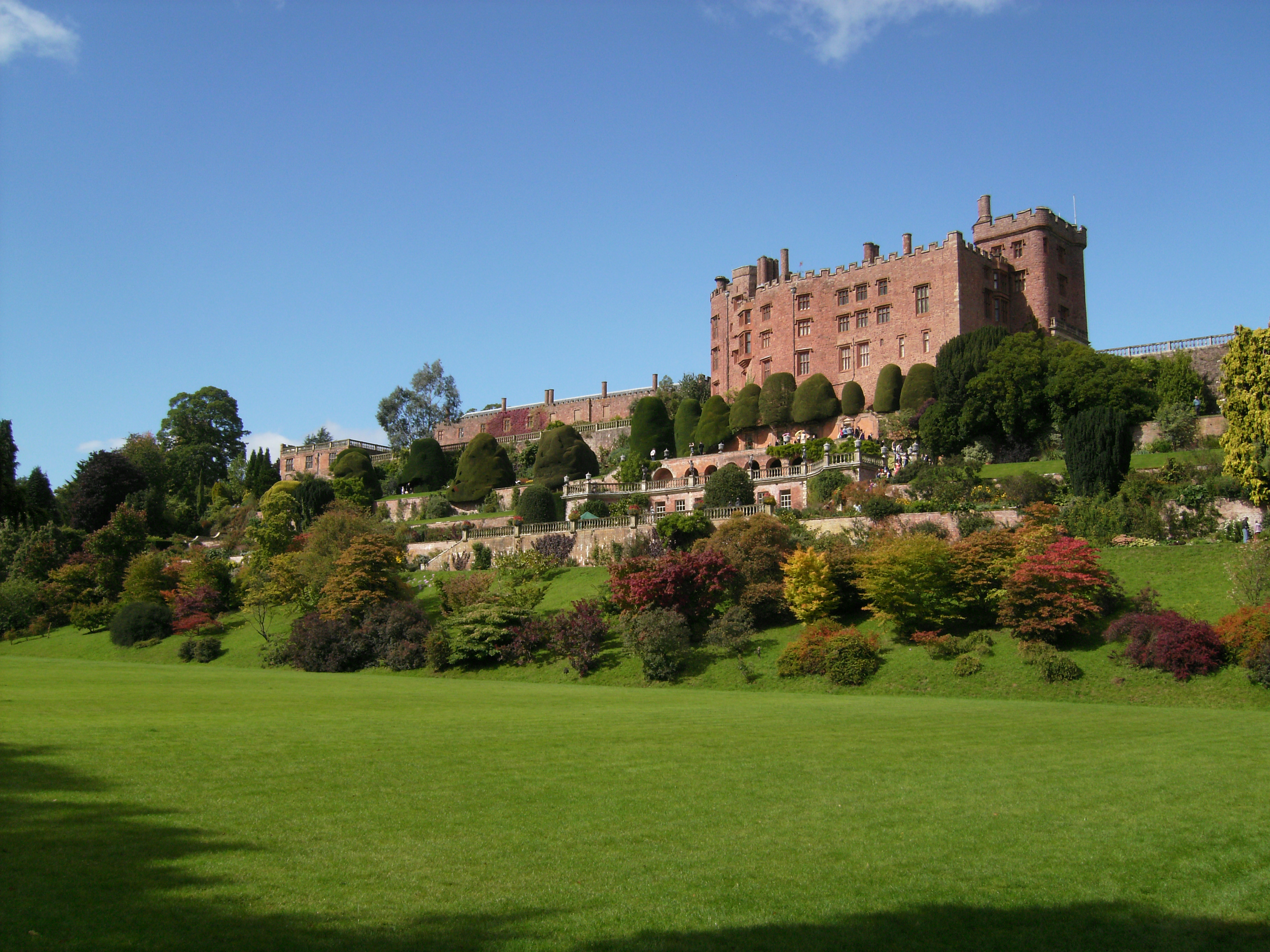
The gardens of Powis Castle are included on the Register

The Cadw/ICOMOS Register of Parks and Gardens of Special Historic Interest in Wales is a heritage register of significant historic parks and gardens in Wales. It is maintained by Cadw, the historic environment service of the Welsh Government and was given statutory status in 2022.

== The Register ==
In 1992, when Elisabeth Whittle described Cadw as having a "somewhat special and guiding role" in the preservation of historic parks and gardens, since they are "an integral part of Welsh archaeological and architectural heritage", a collaboration between Cadw and the International Council on Monuments and Sites (ICOMOS) was working to compile the Register of Landscapes, Parks, and Gardens of Special Historic Interest in Wales. Part 1 of this, the Register of Parks and Gardens of Special Historic Interest in Wales, was published in six volumes between 1994 and 2002, each covering a particular area of Wales, and with an additional volume published in 2007. (Note: Parts 2.1 and 2.2 are the Register of Landscapes of Historic Interest in Wales.)

The register of parks and gardens was given statutory status in 2022 and is administered by Cadw, the historic environment agency of the Welsh Government. The register includes just under 400 sites, ranging from gardens of private houses, to cemeteries and public parks. Parks and gardens are listed at one of three grades, matching the grading system used for listed buildings. Grade I is the highest grade, for sites of exceptional interest; Grade II*, the next highest, denotes parks and gardens of great quality; and Grade II denotes sites of special interest.

== Grade I listed sites ==
The following list includes all registered sites listed at Grade I.

Name	Grid ref. (Note: Sometimes known as OSGB36, the grid reference is based on the British national grid reference system used by the Ordnance Survey. • "Guide to National Grid". Ordnance Survey. Archived from the original on 27 October 2007. • "Get-a-map". Ordnance Survey. Archived from the original on 29 June 2011.)	Principal area	Historic county	Ref. no. (Note: Assigned by Cadw)	Ref.
Bodnant	SH7999772244	Conwy	Denbighshire	PGW(Gd)5(CON)	
Bodysgallen	SH7989079243	Conwy	Caernarfonshire	PGW(Gd)7(CON)	
Cardiff Castle and Bute Park	ST1757077368	Cardiff	Glamorgan	PGW(Gm)22(CDF)	
Chirk Castle	SJ2711438207	Wrexham	Denbighshire	PGW(C)63(WRE)	
Clyne Castle and Clyne Gardens	SS6129591086	Swansea	Glamorgan	PGW(Gm)47(SWA)	
Clytha Park and Clytha Castle	SO3648308959	Monmouthshire	Monmouthshire	PGW(Gt)15(MON)	
Dewstow House	ST4660088900	Monmouthshire	Monmouthshire	PGW(Gt)44(MON)	
Dyffryn	ST0949172493	Vale of Glamorgan	Glamorgan	PGW(Gm)32(GLA)	
Erddig	SJ3279148447	Wrexham	Denbighshire	PGW(C)62(WRE)	
Ffynone	SN2420038600	Pembrokeshire	Pembrokeshire	PGW(Dy)18(PEM)	
Gloddaeth (St. David's College)	SH8022480654	Conwy	Caernarfonshire	PGW(Gd)6(CON)	
Glynllifon	SH4581855073	Gwynedd	Caernarfonshire	PGW(Gd)39(GWY)	
Gregynog	SO0851197303	Powys	Montgomeryshire	PGW(Po)33(POW)	
Gwydir	SH7976760371	Conwy	Caernarfonshire	PGW(Gd)4(CON)	
Hafod	SN7580073300	Ceredigion	Cardiganshire	PGW(Dy)50(CER)	
Haverfordwest Priory	SM9570015200	Pembrokeshire	Pembrokeshire	PGW(Dy)62(PEM)	
Hawarden Castle	SJ3199965211	Flintshire	Flintshire	PGW(C)55(FLT)	
Leeswood Hall	SJ2543361528	Flintshire	Flintshire	PGW(C)47(FLT)	
Leighton Hall	SJ2441404691	Powys	Montgomeryshire	PGW(Po)34(POW)	
Llanfihangel Court	SO3256620539	Monmouthshire	Monmouthshire	PGW(Gt)14(MON)	
Margam Park	SS8088686078	Neath Port Talbot	Glamorgan	PGW(Gm)52(NEP)	
Penrice Castle	SS4982887916	Swansea	Glamorgan	PGW(Gm)68(SWA)	
Piercefield Park	ST5234496023	Monmouthshire	Monmouthshire	PGW(Gt)40(MON)	
Plas Brondanw	SH6162342267	Gwynedd	Merionethshire	PGW(Gd)30(GWY)	
Plas Dinefwr	SN6144022530	Carmarthenshire	Carmarthenshire	PGW(Dy)12(CAM)	
Plas Newydd	SH5202169570	Anglesey	Anglesey	PGW(Gd)48(ANG)	
Powis Castle Garden	SJ2159706343	Powys	Montgomeryshire	PGW(Po)35(POW)	
Raglan Castle	SO4146108308	Monmouthshire	Monmouthshire	PGW(Gt)42(MON)	
Roath Park	ST1839780584	Cardiff	Glamorgan	PGW(Gm)24(CDF)	
Singleton Abbey and Sketty Hall (including Singleton Park)	SS6284291687	Swansea	Glamorgan	PGW(Gm)56(SWA)	
St Donat's Castle	SS9339168164	Vale of Glamorgan	Glamorgan	PGW(Gm)30(GLA)	
St Fagan's Castle	ST1156877209	Cardiff	Glamorgan	PGW(Gm)31(CDF)	
Stackpole Court	SR9750096000	Pembrokeshire	Pembrokeshire	PGW(Dy)44(PEM)	
Stanage Park	SO3315271832	Powys	Radnorshire	PGW(Po)24(POW)	
Vaynol	SH5357169310	Gwynedd	Caernarfonshire	PGW(Gd)52(GWY)	
Vaynor Park	SJ1748700186	Powys	Montgomeryshire	PGW(Po)32(POW)	
Wynnstay	SJ3056542194	Wrexham	Denbighshire	PGW(C)64(WRE)	

== Parks and gardens by principal area ==
List of principal areas and number of sites in each
Principal area	Number of sites			
Principal area	Grade I	Grade II*	Grade II	Total
Anglesey	1	5	3	9
Blaenau Gwent	0	0	1	1
Bridgend	0	1	5	6
Caerphilly	0	0	5	5
Cardiff	3	5	10	18
Carmarthenshire	1	4	14	19
Ceredigion	1	2	9	12
Conwy	4	4	15	23
Denbighshire	0	5	22	27
Flintshire	2	6	16	24
Gwynedd	3	10	19	32
Merthyr Tydfil	0	2	1	3
Monmouthshire	5	9	34	48
Neath Port Talbot	1	1	4	6
Newport	0	1	9	10
Pembrokeshire	3	8	24	35
Powys	5	16	30	51
Rhondda Cynon Taf	0	2	3	5
Swansea	3	0	11	14
Torfaen	0	1	1	2
Vale of Glamorgan	2	4	12	18
Wrexham	3	3	11	17
Total	37	89	259	385

Source: Cadw

== Other parts of the United Kingdom ==
Separate registers of parks, gardens and designed landscapes are maintained in the other countries of the United Kingdom:

- The Register of Historic Parks and Gardens of Special Historic Interest in England is maintained by English Heritage
- The Inventory of Gardens and Designed Landscapes in Scotland is maintained by Historic Environment Scotland
- The Register of Parks, Gardens and Demesnes of Special Historic Interest is maintained by the Northern Ireland Environment Agency

== Documents ==
Cadw/ICOMOS, Register of Landscapes, Parks and Gardens of Special Historic Interest in Wales, Part 1:

- Parks and Gardens — Gwent. (1994)
- Parks and Gardens — Clwyd (1995)
- Parks and Gardens — Conwy, Gwynedd & the Isle of Anglesey (1998)
- Parks and Gardens — Powys (1999)
- Parks and Gardens — Glamorgan (2000)
- Parks and Gardens — Carmarthenshire, Ceredigion & Pembrokeshire (2002)
- Parks and Gardens — Additional and Revised Entries (2007)
