= Joseph Bradney =

British soldier, historian and archaeologist

Joseph Alfred Bradney
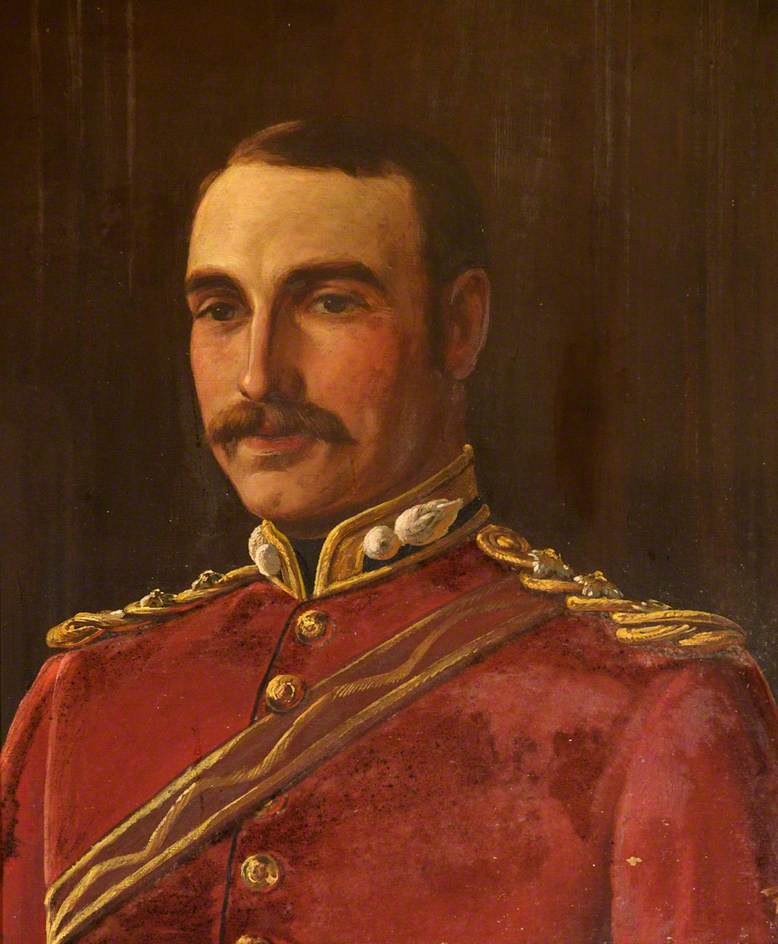
- Bradney as a lieutenant of the Royal Monmouthshire Royal Engineers Militia in 1885.
- Born: 11 January 1859; Greet, Tenbury Wells, Shropshire, England
- Died: 21 July 1933 (aged 74); Monmouth, Monmouthshire, Wales
- Military career
- Allegiance: United Kingdom
- Branch: British Army
- Service years: 1882–1918 (36 years)
- Rank: Colonel
- Commands: 2nd Battalion, Monmouthshire Regiment (1892–1912)
- Conflicts: World War I, France 1917–1918

Colonel Sir Joseph Alfred Bradney, CB DL JP FSA (11 January 1859 – 21 July 1933) was a British soldier, historian and antiquarian. He was best known for his A History of Monmouthshire from the Coming of the Normans into Wales down to the Present Time which comprises four volumes, each one of which comprises two parts.

== Life ==
Joseph Bradney was born at Greet, Tenbury Wells, Shropshire, and educated at Harrow (Note: At Harrow, two of Bradney's near contemporaries were Stanley Baldwin and Winston Churchill.) and Trinity College, Cambridge. He acquired, partly by inheritance and partly purchase, Tal-y-coed Court, (Note: The Tal-y-coed estate was inherited from his mother, Elizabeth, daughter of Sir John Hopkins, of Ty Isha, Llanvihangel-Ystern-Llewern, Monmouthshire's only Lord Mayor of London.) an estate at Talycoed, Llanvihangel-Ystern-Llewern, near Monmouth, where he settled at an early age. He entered the army, serving as captain of the Royal Monmouth Royal Engineers Militia from 1882 to 1892, and lieutenant-colonel commanding the 2nd Battalion, Monmouthshire Regiment from 1892 to 1912. In the Territorial Force Reserve from 1912 to 1919, he served in France in 1917–18, despite being 57 years old. (Note: Bradney's youngest son, Walter, was killed at Peronne during the German Spring Offensive in early 1918.) In contravention of the King's Regulations, Bradney kept a diary throughout his period of active service. (Note: Bradney's diary records his distress at his wife Rosa's mental breakdown which saw her confined to a mental hospital, Roehampton Priory, in late 1917; "poor Rosa. She was as full of delusions as ever"; and his dismay at the death of his youngest son; "feel most depressed and full of sorrow".)

Bradney was High Sheriff of Monmouthshire in 1889, Deputy lieutenant of the county, and a county councillor from 1898 to 1924, (Note: Other sources suggest that he served until 1928.) serving as Chairman in 1921. He was also a governor and on the Council of the National Library of Wales and the National Museum of Wales. He was a member of the Royal Commission on the Ancient and Historical Monuments of Wales, and was awarded an honorary doctorate of laws from the University of Wales. He was appointed a Companion of the Bath in 1911, and knighted in 1924.

He wrote extensively on the history of Monmouthshire, his major work being A History of Monmouthshire from the Coming of the Normans into Wales down to the Present Time, published in twelve volumes between 1904 and 1933. A final volume, drawing on his notes, was published posthumously. The books have been described as a "monumental survey, extensively illustrated and containing dozens of pedigrees, [which remains] a basic reference work essential for the serious study of local history or genealogy in Monmouthshire." He shared an interest in vulgar limericks with the antiquarian Egerton Phillimore though Bradney's letters to Phillimore were often written in Latin.

He was married twice, first to Rosa Jenkins (d. 1927), with whom he had three sons and two daughters, and then to Florence Prothero. A Latin tablet in the Church of St Michael and All Angels, Llanvihangel-Ystern-Llewern records his achievements.

== Works ==
- Genealogical memoranda relating to the families of Hopkins of Llanfihangel Ystern Llewern, Co. Monmouth, and Probyn of Newland, Co. Gloucester, 1889
- A History of Monmouthshire: From the coming of the Normans into Wales down to the present time, 4 vols, London: Mitchell, Hughes and Clarke, 1904-1933
- (ed.) The diary of Walter Powell of Llantilio Crossenny in the county of Monmouth, gentleman 1603-1654, 1907
- (ed.) Llyfr Baglan : or The book of Baglan, by John Williams, London: Mitchell, Hughes and Clarke, 1910
- A History of the Free Grammar School in the Parish of Llantilio-Crosseny in the County of Monmouh, 1924

== A History of Monmouthshire ==
Bradney's History comprised twelve volumes, divided by the traditional administrative areas of Hundreds. The work covered six of the seven hundreds of Monmouthshire.

- Volume I Part 1, The Hundred of Skenfrith, (1904) OCLC 896129125
- Volume I Part 2, The Hundred of Abergavenny, (1906), OCLC 895940655
- Volume II Part 1, The Hundred of Raglan, (1911), OCLC 895940653
- Volume II Part 2, The Hundred of Trelech, (1913), OCLC 895939552
- Volume III Part 1, The Hundred of Usk, (1921) OCLC 502610834
- Volume III Part 2, The Hundred of Usk, (1923), OCLC 502610826
- Volume IV Part 1, The Hundred of Caldicot, (1929), OCLC 896116356
- Volume IV Part 2 The Hundred of Caldicot, (1932), OCLC 502610829
- Four volumes consisting of a List of Subscribers, Addenda and Corrigenda, and Indices of Names and Places.

Between 1991 and 1993, the history was reprinted by Academy Books, and subsequently the Merton Priory Press, as an 80% sized facsimile. The work was arranged slightly differently to the original history. The indices were included in their respective Parts and a fifth volume, which covers the last Hundred of Newport, was compiled from Bradney's manuscripts by medieval historian Dr Madeleine Gray. The re-ordered works were:

- Volume 1 Part 1, The Hundred of Skenfrith, (1991) ISBN 1873361092
- Volume 1 Part 2a, The Hundred of Abergavenny, (1992), ISBN 9781873361122
- Volume 1 Part 2b, The Hundred of Abergavenny, (1992), ISBN 9781873361139
- Volume 2 Part 1, The Hundred of Raglan, (1992) ISBN 9781873361153
- Volume 2 Part 2, The Hundred of Trelech, (1992), ISBN 9781873361160
- Volume 3 Part 1, The Hundred of Usk, (1993), ISBN 9781873361177
- Volume 3 Part 2, The Hundred of Usk, (1993), ISBN 9780952000938
- Volume 4 Part 1, The Hundred of Caldicot, (1994), ISBN 9781873361160
- Volume 4 Part 2 The Hundred of Caldicot, (1994), ISBN 9780952000952
- Volume 5 The Hundred of Newport, (1993).

Volume 5 contains an Introduction by Dr Gray which includes a biography of Bradney, her response to the criticism of his History of Monmouthshire by local historian Canon E.T. Davies (Note: Published as Davies 1986) and her critique of Bradney's writings.

== Sources ==
- Collins, William James Townsend (1945). Monmouthshire Writers: A Literary History and Anthology. Newport: R. H. Johns Ltd. OCLC 236089162.
- Deneire, T.&B. (2019). Nights in Flanders. Joseph Alfred Bradney, Latin Poet of the Great War. S.L.: Self-published book. ISBN 9781794740488.
- Davies, Ebenezer Thomas (1986). Bradney's "History of Monmouthshire": An Assessment. Abergavenny, Monmouthshire: Regional Publications. ISBN 0906570212. OCLC 17776795.
- Evans, Cyril James Oswald (1953). Monmouthshire: Its History and Topography. Cardiff: William Lewis Printers. OCLC 2415203.
- Bradney, Joseph (1993). Madeleine Gray (ed.). The Hundred of Newport. A History of Monmouthshire from the Coming of the Normans into Wales down to the Present Time. Vol. 5. London: Academy Books. ISBN 9780950867670. OCLC 29008842.
- Newman, John (2000). Gwent/Monmouthshire. The Buildings of Wales. London: Penguin. ISBN 0-14-071053-1.
- Rimmer, David (2013). "The County Histories of Monmouthshire and Gwent" (PDF). The Monmouthshire Antiquary (XXIX). Monmouthshire Antiquarian Society: 103–116.
- — (2015). "Colonel Bradney: a Monmouthshire soldier's Great War" (PDF). The Monmouthshire Antiquary (XXXI). Monmouthshire Antiquarian Society: 103–124.
