= Melin Bompren =

Building re-erected at St Fagans National Museum of History, Cardiff, Wales

Coordinates: 51°29′12″N 3°16′33″W

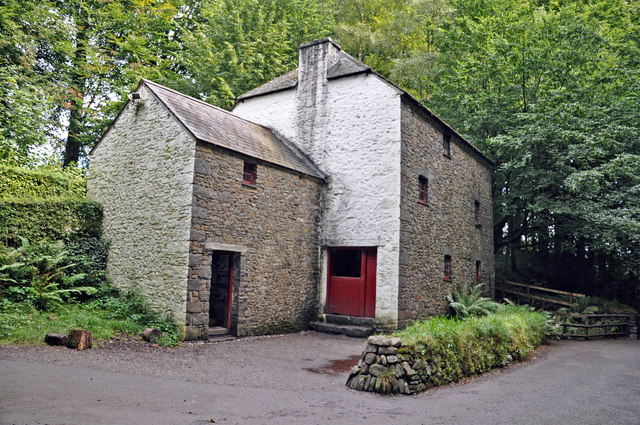
Melin Bompren in its present location at St Fagans

Melin Bompren (English: "Woodenbridge Mill") is a water-powered corn mill, originally located at Cross Inn, Cardiganshire, Wales, but now at the St Fagans National History Museum, Cardiff.

The mill was built in 1853 to grind corn into flour. It also has a kiln attached, which was used for drying oats when the mill was in its original location.

The mill went out of use in 1957. In 1970 a decision was made to move it to St Fagans, where it opened to the public in 1977.

The name of the mill originates in the Welsh language as "Woodenbridge mill", "Bompren" is a development on "Bont Pren" which means "Wooden Bridge".

The mill is sometimes occupied by a skilled miller, who operates the grinding mill and explains its workings to visitors.

== Bibliography ==
- Welsh Folk Museum, Melin Bompren Corn Mill: At the Welsh Folk Museum, St Fagans, Cardiff (1977). ISBN 978-0854850426
