= Vulcan Hotel =

The term Vulcan Hotel can refer to:

- The Vulcan, Cardiff
- The Vulcan Hotel (Saint Bathans), located in Saint Bathans, New Zealand
