= St Fagans National Museum of History =

Open-air museum near Cardiff, Wales

- Sain Ffagan: Amgueddfa Werin Cymru
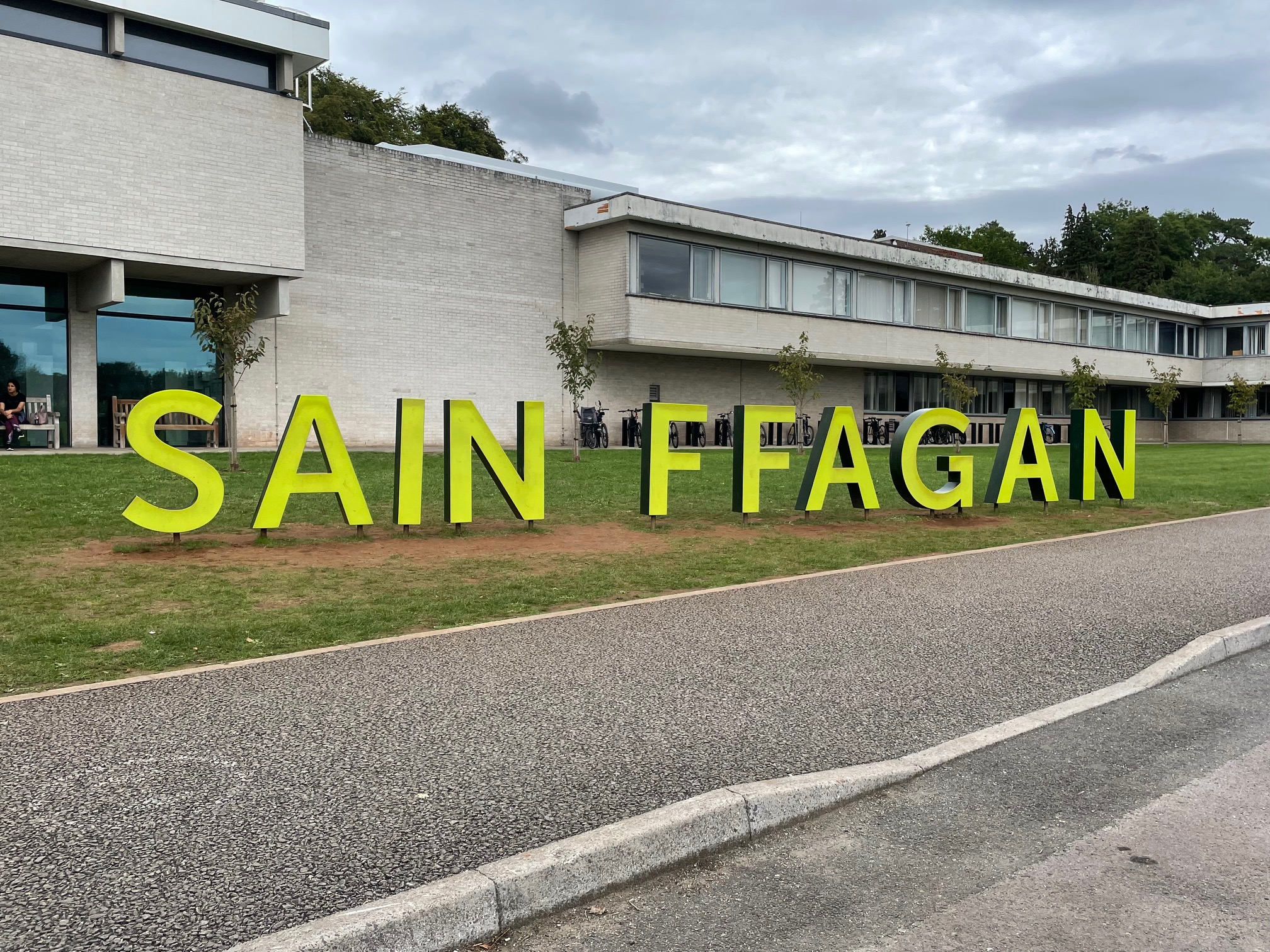
- The administration offices in the background

- Location in Cardiff, Wales
- Former name: St Fagans National History Museum
- Established: 1948
- Location: St Fagans, Cardiff, Wales
- Coordinates: 51.4869°N 3.2725°W
- Visitors: 570,207 (2025)
- Website: museum.wales/stfagans

St Fagans National Museum of History (/ˈfæɡənz/ FAG-ənz; Welsh: Sain Ffagan: Amgueddfa Werin Cymru), commonly referred to as St Fagans after the village where it is located, is an open-air museum in St Fagans, Cardiff, Wales, chronicling the historical lifestyle, culture, and architecture of the Welsh people. The museum is part of the wider network of Amgueddfa Cymru – Museum Wales.

It consists of more than forty re-erected buildings from various locations in Wales, and is set in the grounds of St Fagans Castle, a Grade I listed Elizabethan manor house. In 2011 Which? magazine named the museum the United Kingdom's favourite visitor attraction.

A six-year, £30-million revamp was completed in 2018 and the museum was named the Art Fund Museum of the Year in 2019.

== History ==
The museum was founded in 1946 following the donation of the castle and lands by the Earl of Plymouth. It opened its doors to the public in July 1948, under the name of the Welsh Folk Museum. The museum's name in Welsh (also meaning "Welsh Folk Museum") has remained unchanged since that date, whereas the English title was revised to Museum of Welsh Life, thereafter St Fagans National History Museum, and again to its current title.

The brainchild of Iorwerth Peate, the museum was modelled on Skansen, the outdoor museum of vernacular Swedish architecture in Stockholm. Most structures re-erected in Skansen were built of wood and are thus easily taken apart and reassembled, but a comparable museum in Wales was going to be more ambitious, as much of the vernacular architecture of Wales is made of masonry.

=== 2017 refurbishment ===
A redeveloped main reception building was opened in July 2017. The six-year, £30-million redevelopment of the site, which was funded by a number of sources, notably the Welsh Government and the National Lottery, was completed in October 2018.

The £30-million redevelopment project provided many benefits, including three new galleries showcasing Wales’ history, improvements to buildings such as the Iron Age farmstead, Bryn Eryr, and Medieval Prince's court and Llys Llywelyn, as well as a refurbished main entrance building and a new restaurant, play area and learning spaces. One of the new buildings, the Gweithdy ('workshop'), features Stone Age tools and stick chairs.

In June 2019, St Fagans was named UK's Museum of the Year 2019 by the Art Fund, which commended the facility's "exceptional imagination, innovation and achievement".

== Buildings and exhibits ==
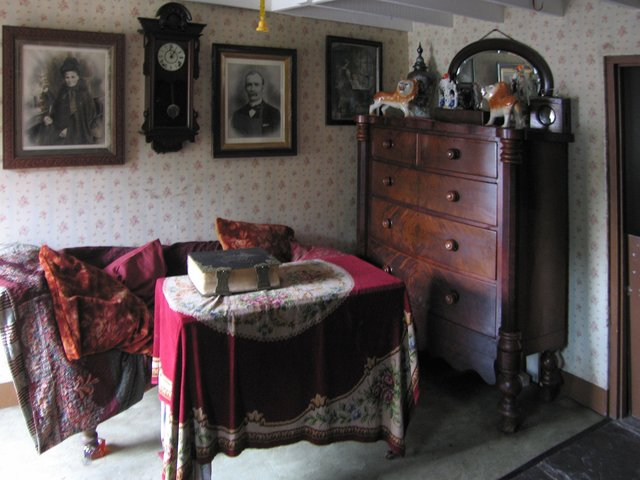
Interior of late 19th century terraced house (Rhyd-y-Car ironworkers' cottages)

The museum comprises more than forty buildings representing the architecture of Wales, including a nonconformist chapel (in this case, Unitarian), a village schoolhouse, a toll road tollbooth (below), a cockpit (below), a pigsty (below), and a tannery (below).

The museum holds displays of traditional crafts, with a working blacksmith forge, a pottery, a weaver, a miller, and a clog maker. It also includes two working water mills: one flour mill and one wool mill. Part of the site includes a small working farm which concentrates on preserving local Welsh native breeds of livestock. Produce from the museum's bakery and flour mill is available for sale.

The medieval parish church of Saint Teilo, formerly at Llandeilo Tal-y-bont in west Glamorgan (restored to its pre-Reformation state), was opened in October 2007 by the Archbishop of Canterbury, Rowan Williams, and still serves as a place of worship for Christmas, Easter, and Harvest Thanksgiving. A Tudor merchant's house from Haverfordwest was opened in 2012. A relocation of the historic Vulcan public house from Newtown in Cardiff to St Fagans was completed in May 2024.

Although the museum was intended to preserve aspects of Welsh rural life, it now includes several buildings that depict the industrial working life that succeeded it, that being almost extinct in Wales. There is a row of workers' cottages, depicting furnishing from 1800 to 1985, from Rhyd-y-car near Merthyr Tydfil (below), as well as the pristine Oakdale Workmen's Institute. A post-war prefabricated bungalow (below) represents later domestic lifestyles.

From 1996 to 2012, the museum hosted the Everyman Summer Theatre Festival when it re-located from Dyffryn Gardens. This festival, which includes a Shakespeare play, a musical, and a children's show, has become part of the Welsh theatrical calendar since its founding at Dyffryn in 1983.

Scenes from the Doctor Who episodes "Human Nature" and "The Family of Blood" were filmed at the museum.

Based on archaeological findings, a reconstruction of Llys Rhosyr, a thirteenth-century court of the princes of Gwynedd, was completed and opened to the public in October 2018. Called Llys Llewelyn ('Llewelyn's Court'), it was opened with the intention that schoolchildren would be able to stay in the buildings overnight, from spring 2019.

The Gweithdy ('Workshop'), a sustainable building designed by Feilden Clegg Bradley Studios, was first opened in July 2017; a café was later added. The new gallery was opened in October 2018, housing improved facilities for visitors while supporting the study of collections and hosting demonstrations and workshops by traditional craftsmen.

=== List of structures ===
Image	Name	Date	Re-erected	Original site	County (historic)	Unitary Authority (modern)	Listing
	Main entrance and administration offices (Dale Owen of Percy Thomas Partnership architects).	1968–74	—	St Fagans	Glamorgan	Cardiff	Grade II
	St Teilo's Church	c. 1100–c. 1520 (present form: c. 1520)	2007	Llandeilo Tal-y-bont, near Pontarddulais	Glamorgan	Swansea	—
	Boathouse and nethouse		(Reconstruction)				—
	Cilewent farmhouse	begun 1470 (present form: 1734)	1959	Cwmdauddwr	Radnorshire	Powys	Grade II
	Clogmaker's workshop	—	—	Ysgeifiog, near St Davids	Pembrokeshire	Pembrokeshire	—
	Tudor Merchant's House	16th century	2012	Haverfordwest	Pembrokeshire	Pembrokeshire	—
	Hendre'r Ywydd Uchaf farmhouse	1508	1962	Llangynhafal, near Llandyrnog	Denbighshire	Denbighshire	Grade II
	Y Garreg Fawr farmhouse	1544	1984	Waunfawr	Caernarfonshire	Gwynedd	
	Stryt Lydan barn	c. 1550	1951	Penley	Flintshire	Wrexham	Grade II
	St Fagans Castle	1580	—	St Fagans	Glamorgan	Cardiff	Grade I
	Dovecote	18th century	—	St Fagans	Glamorgan	Cardiff	Grade II
	Hendre Wen barn	c. 1600	1982	Llanrwst	Denbighshire	Conwy	—
	Hawk and Buckle Inn cockpit (Denbigh Cockpit)	17th century	1970	Denbigh	Denbighshire	Denbighshire	Grade II
	Kennixton Farmhouse	1610	1955	Llangennith	Glamorgan	Swansea	Grade II
	Lead cistern in east forecourt of St Fagans Castle	1620	—	St Fagans	Glamorgan	Cardiff	Grade II*
	Abernodwydd farmhouse	1678	1955	Llangadfan	Montgomeryshire	Powys	Grade II
	Llawr-y-glyn Smithy	18th century	1972	Llawryglyn	Montgomeryshire	Powys	Grade II
	Rhaeadr Tannery	late 18th century	1968	Rhayader	Montgomeryshire	Powys	Grade II
	Esgair Moel woollen mill	1760	1952	Llanwrtyd	Brecknockshire	Powys	Grade II
	Llainfadyn Cottage	1762	1962	Rhostryfan	Caernarfonshire	Gwynedd	Grade II
	Nant Wallter cottage	c. 1770	1993	Taliaris, near Llandeilo	Carmarthenshire	Carmarthenshire	—
	Southgate tollhouse (Penparcau Tollhouse)	1772	1968	Penparcau, Aberystwyth	Cardiganshire	Ceredigion	Grade II
	Pen Rhiw Unitarian chapel (Capel Pen Rhiw)	1777	1956	Dre-fach Felindre	Carmarthenshire	Carmarthenshire	Grade II
	Cae Adda byre	18th–19th century	2003	Waunfawr	Caernarfonshire	Gwynedd	—
	Pigsty	c. 1800	1977	Hendre Ifan Prosser	Glamorgan	Rhondda Cynon Taf	—
	Rhyd-y-Car ironworkers' cottages	c. 1800	1986	Rhyd-y-Car, Merthyr Tydfil	Glamorgan	Merthyr Tydfil	—
	Llwyn-yr-Eos farmhouse	begun 1820	—	St Fagans	Glamorgan	Cardiff	Grade II
	Gorse mill	after 1842	1983	Dôl-wen	Denbighshire	Denbighshire	—
	Melin Bompren corn mill	begun 1852	1977	Cross Inn	Carmarthenshire	Ceredigion	—
	Maentwrog Hayshed	1870	1977	Maentwrog	Merionethshire	Gwynedd	—
	Summer House	c. 1880	1988	Bute Park, Cardiff	Glamorgan	Cardiff	—
	Gwalia Stores	1880	1991	Ogmore Vale	Glamorgan	Bridgend	—
	Maestir School	in use 1880–1916	1984	Maestir, near Lampeter	Cardiganshire	Ceredigion	—
	Ty'n Rhos Sawmill	1892	1994	Tŷ'n Rhos, near Llanddewi Brefi	Cardiganshire	Ceredigion	—
	Tailor's shop	1896 (extended 1920s)	1992	Cross Inn	Cardiganshire	Ceredigion	—
	Ewenny Pottery	c. 1900	1988	Ewenny	Glamorgan	Vale of Glamorgan	—
	Ewenny Kiln	c. 1800	1988	Ewenny	Glamorgan	Vale of Glamorgan	—
	Derwen bakehouse	1900	1987	Thespian Street, Aberystwyth	Cardiganshire	Ceredigion	—
	Urinal	c. 1901–10	1978	Llandrindod railway station	Radnorshire	Powys	—
	Oakdale Workmen's Institute	1916	1995	Oakdale	Monmouthshire	Caerphilly	—
	Saddler's workshop	1926	1986	St Clears	Carmarthenshire	Carmarthenshire	—
	Blaenwaun Post Office	1936	1992	Blaenwaun, near Whitland	Carmarthenshire	Carmarthenshire	—
	Newbridge War Memorial	1936	1996	Caetwmpyn Park, Newbridge	Monmouthshire	Caerphilly	—
	Anderson air raid shelter	c. 1939–45					—
	Prefab bungalow	1948	1998	Gabalfa, Cardiff	Glamorgan	Cardiff	—
	House for the Future/ Ty Gwyrdd	2000	—	St Fagans	Glamorgan	Cardiff	
	Bryn Eryr Iron Age roundhouses		2015 (Reconstruction)		Anglesey	Anglesey	—
	Gweithdy	2016 (opened 2018)	—	St Fagans	Glamorgan	Cardiff	—
	Llys Llewelyn, 13th century royal court	1200s	2016–18 (Reconstruction)	Rhosyr	Anglesey	Anglesey	—
	The Vulcan Hotel	1853	2012-2024	Adamsdown, Cardiff	Glamorgan	Cardiff	—

=== Minor exhibits ===
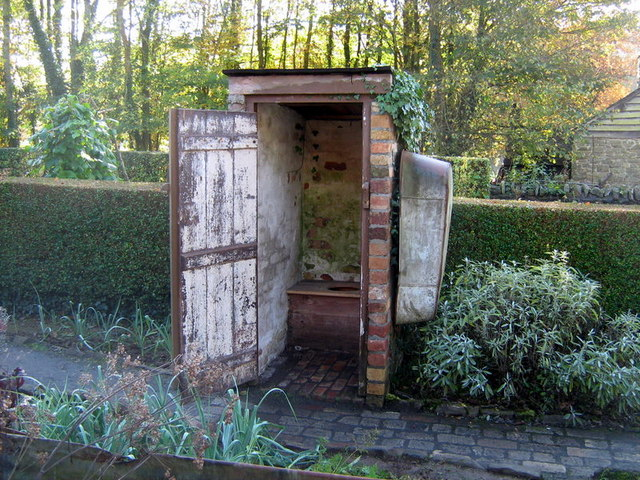
Tŷ-Bach (Little House). Toilet in the garden of Rhyd-y-Car ironworkers' cottages

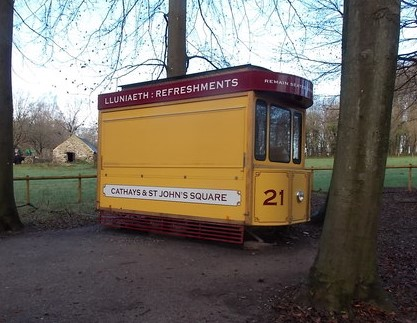
A Cardiff refreshment kiosk

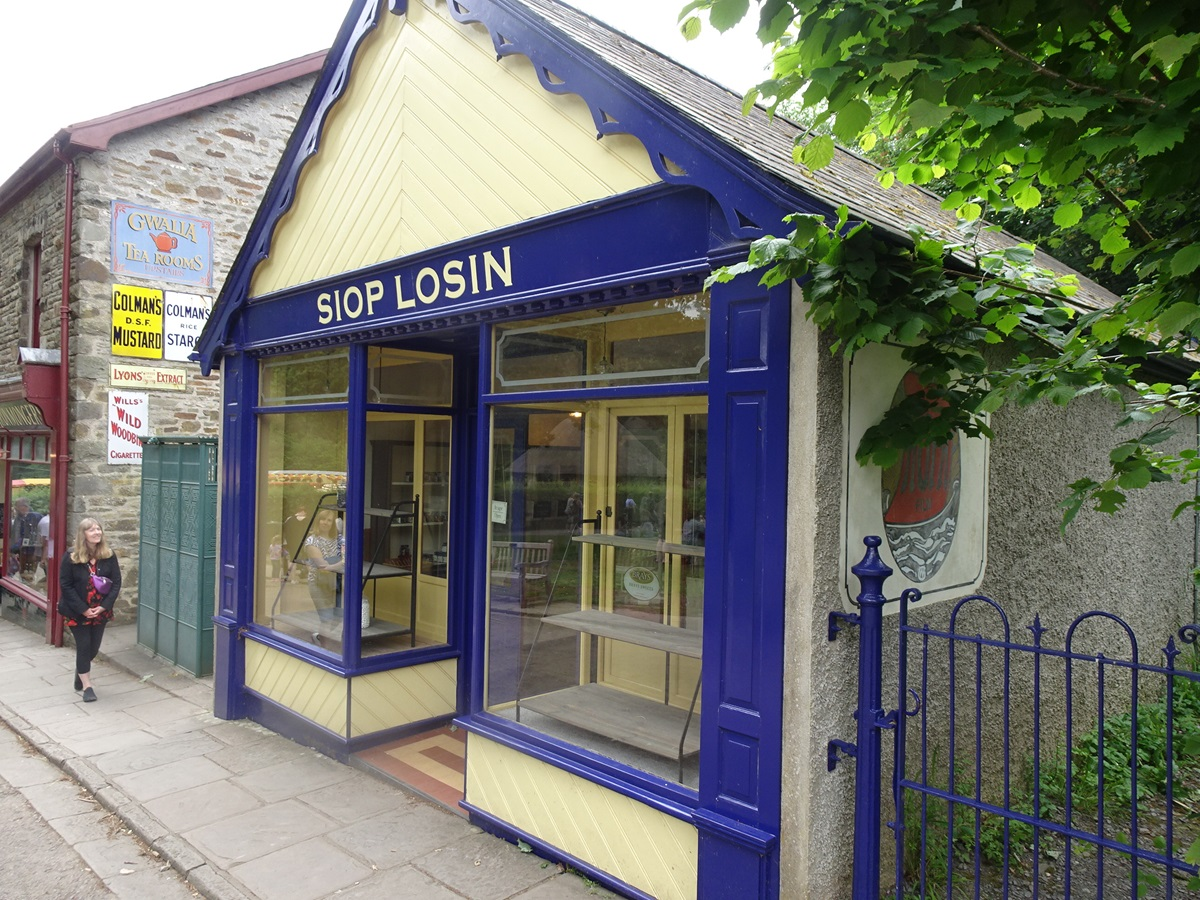
Siop Losin (sweet shop), previously Moss-Vernon's Portrait Studio

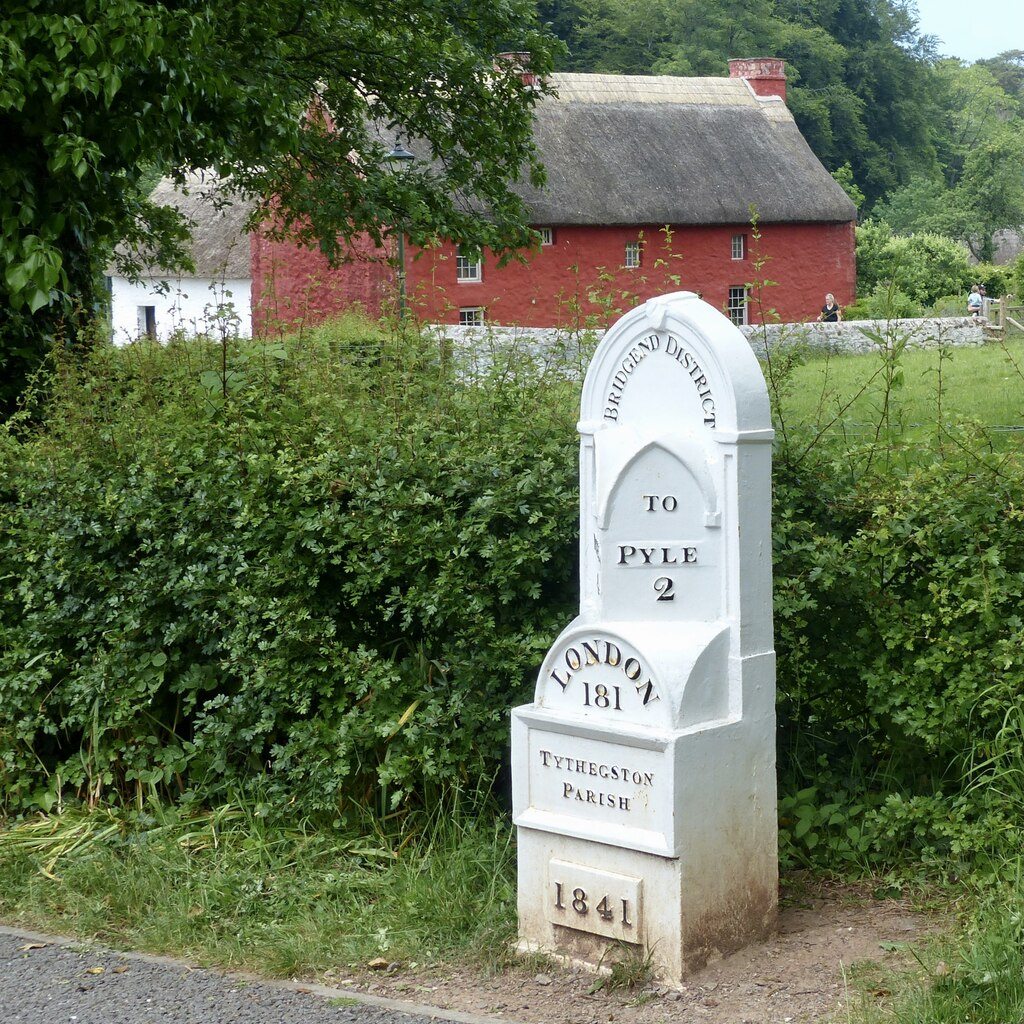
Mile post from Bridgend

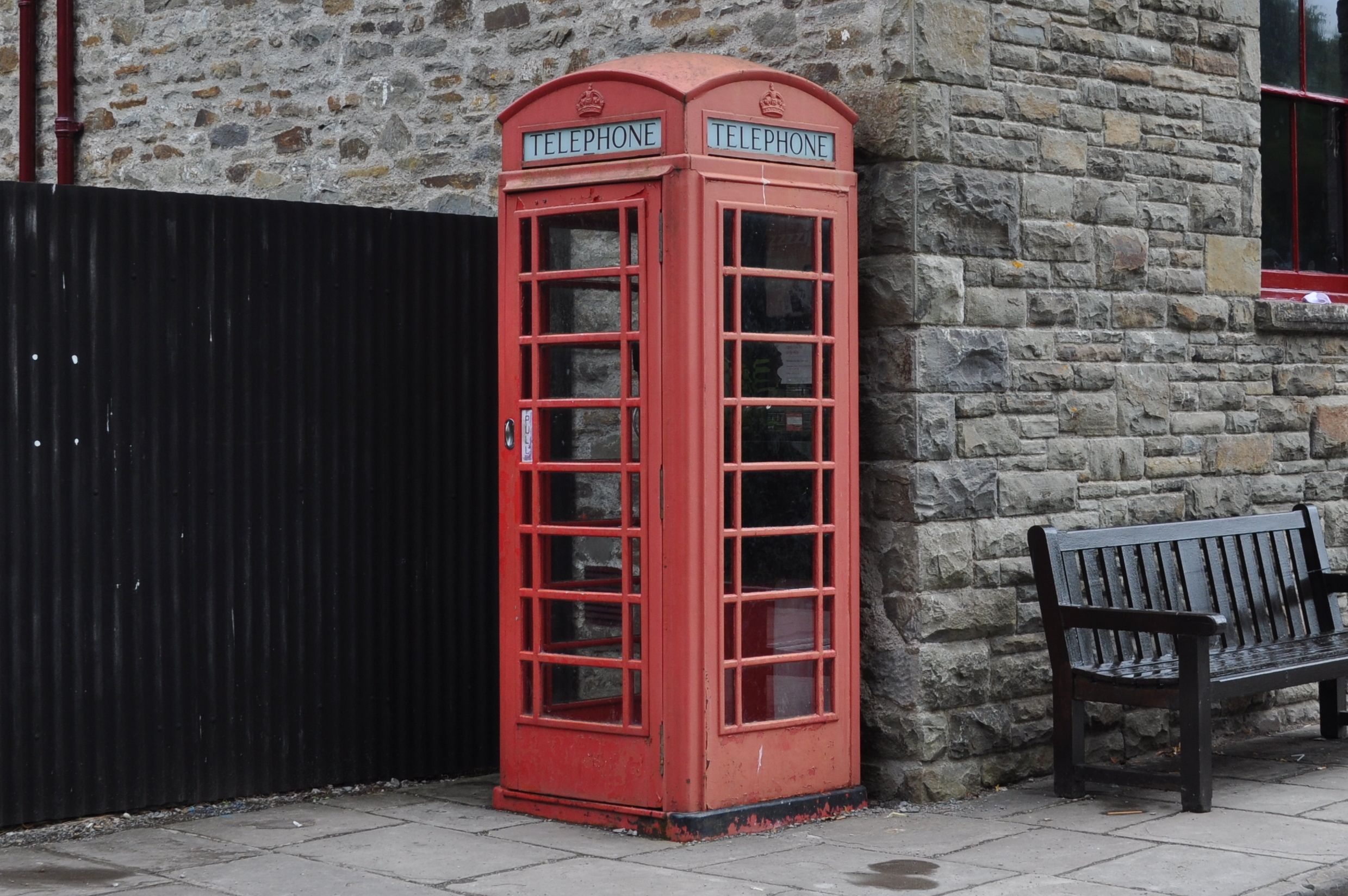
Red telephone box

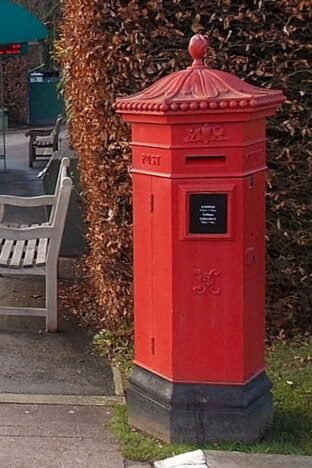
Victorian pillarbox

== St Fagans National Museum of History years ==
- St Fagans In January 2011 (January 2011)

== Future developments ==
- The rebuilding of the Victorian police station from Taff's Well, Rhondda Cynon Taf.
- In 2012 it was announced that Raglan railway station would be rebuilt at the museum.

== See also ==
- Avoncroft Museum of Historic Buildings – Bromsgrove, England
- Beamish Museum – County Durham, England
- Black Country Living Museum - Dudley, England
- Blists Hill Victorian Town - Ironbridge, Telford, Shropshire
- Summerlee Heritage Park – Coatbridge, North Lanarkshire, Scotland
