= Gwalia Stores =

Building re-erected at St Fagans National History Museum, Cardiff, Wales

Coordinates: 51°29′16″N 3°16′40″W

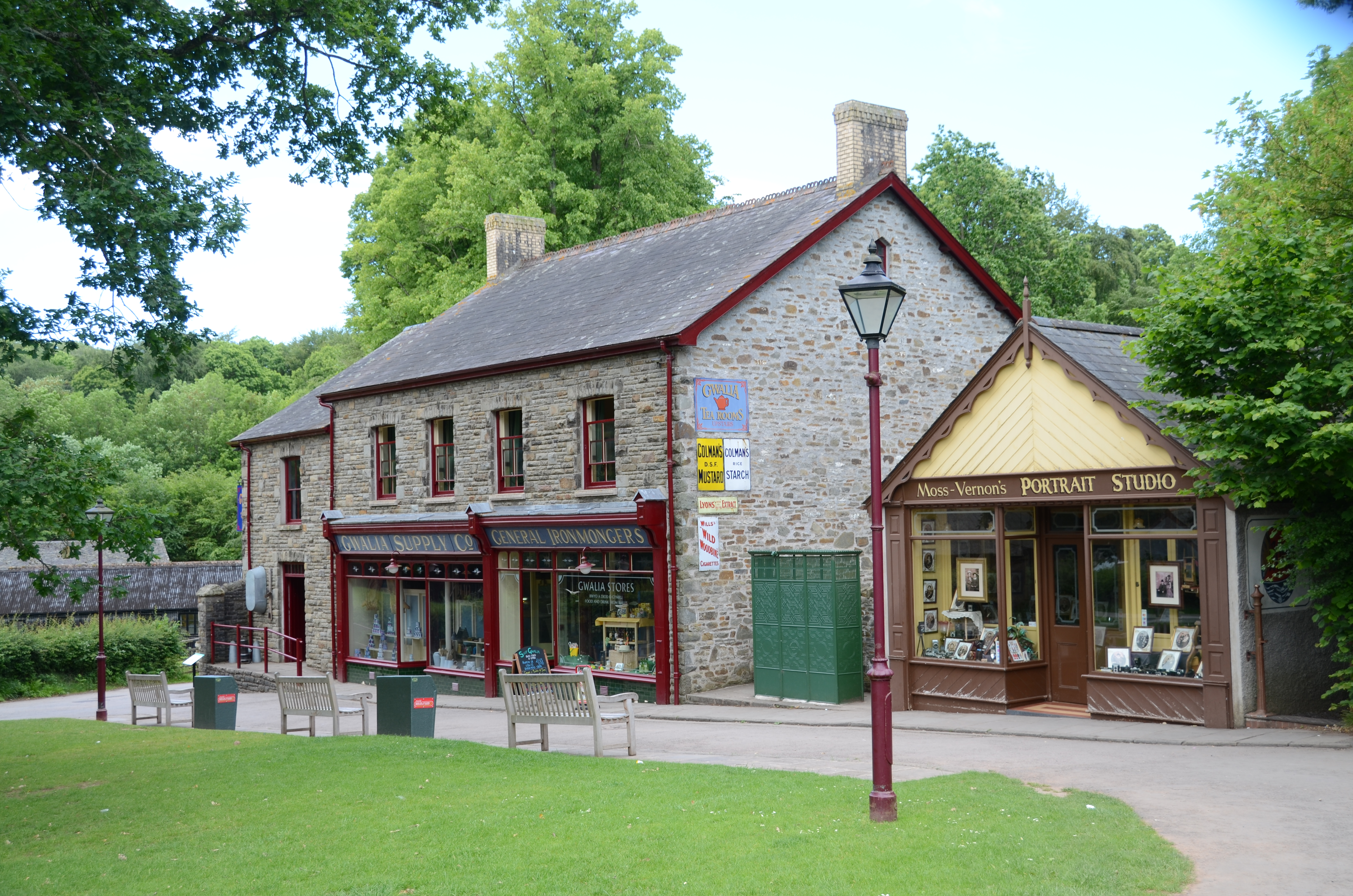
Gwalia Stores in its present location at St Fagans

Gwalia Stores is a retail premises originally built at Ogmore Vale, Glamorgan, in 1880 and currently located at St Fagans National History Museum, Cardiff, Wales.

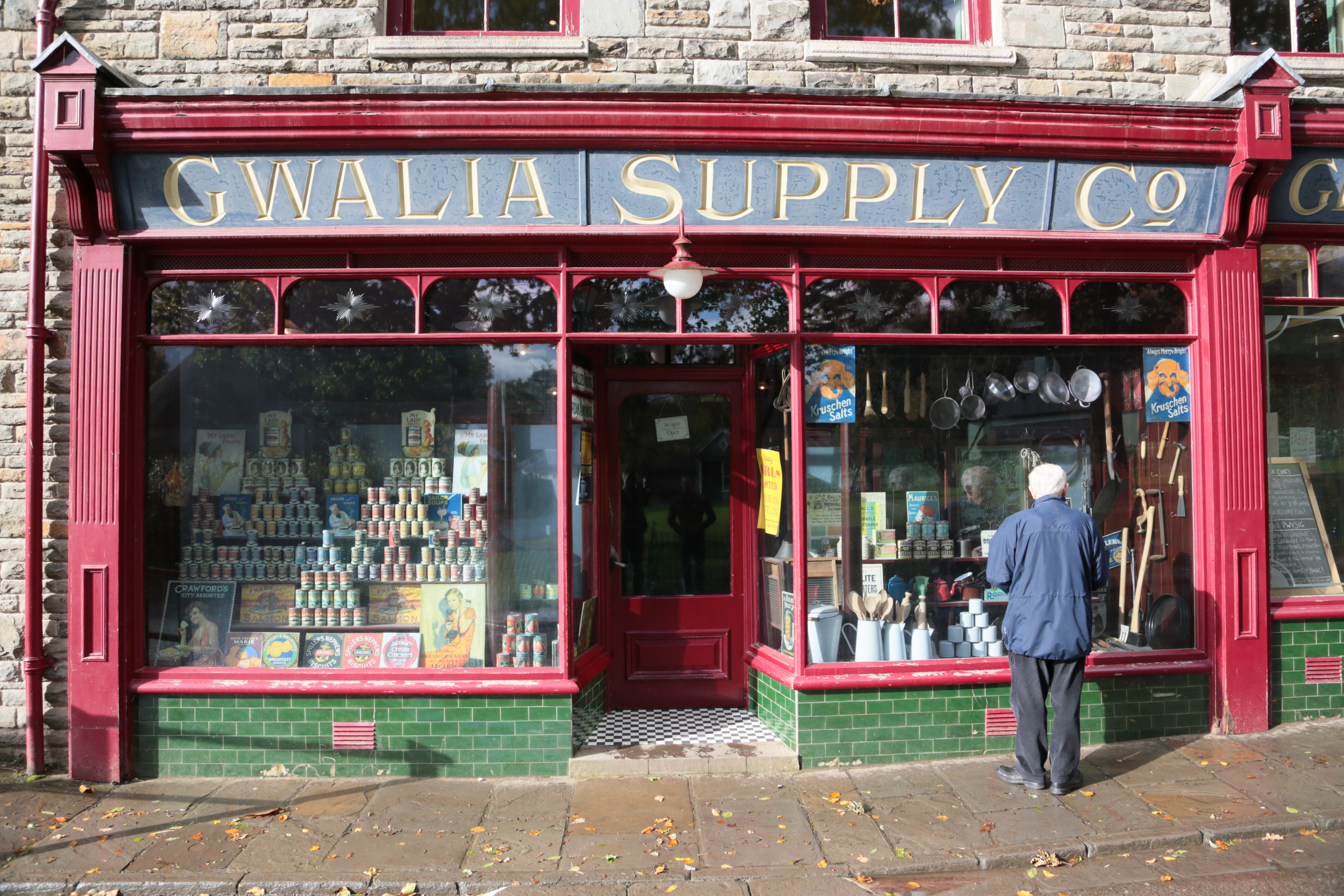
The shop front of Gwalia Stores

The stores were a family business, run by William Llewellyn and his family. By 1916 the departments included bakery, ironmongery, grocery, men's outfitters, pharmacy and animal feeds. Some of the stores' employees also lodged on the premises. "Gwalia Stores" was a popular name for grocery stores in Wales during the early 20th century, and other shops with the same or similar names, unconnected to the one at St Fagans, can still be found.

The stores closed for business in Ogmore Vale in 1973 and reopened at St Fagans in 1991. Part of the shop is still a retail premises; the rest of the ground floor is set up as it would have been during the 1920s. The first floor contains a tearoom.
