= Esgair Moel =

Building re-erected at St Fagans National Museum of History, Cardiff, Wales

Coordinates: 51.4887°N 3.2708°W

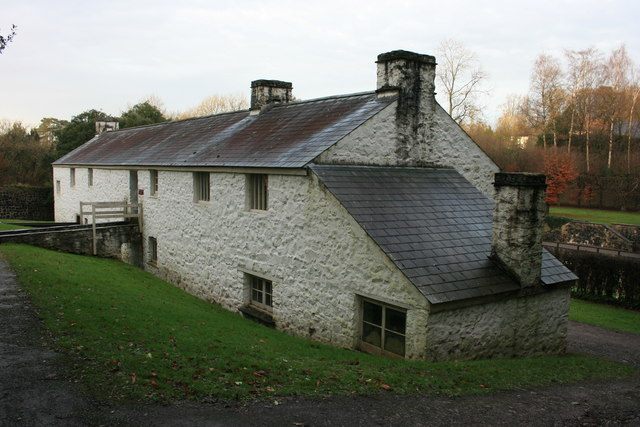
Esgair Moel Woollen Mill in its present location

Esgair Moel is a woollen mill, originally built in the early 18th century and now reconstructed at St Fagans National Museum of History in Cardiff, Wales. It was the second historic building to be erected at the museum.

The mill was built in around 1760, close to a farm of the same name near the small town of Llanwrtyd in Powys. After being enlarged during the 19th century, when the spinning jack, made by John Davies of Llanbrynmair in about 1830 and thought to be the only one of its age and kind still in use, was installed, along with carding engines purchased from a mill in Yorkshire. The mill eventually closed down in 1947 and was relocated and rebuilt at St Fagans in 1952.

All the processes from dyeing of fleece to finishing of fabric, can be carried out within the building, which still produces woollen shawls and blankets for sale. The two handlooms, dating from the mid-18th century, were converted to be used with a flying shuttle. The water wheel is located on the ground floor and is fed by water pumped from a pool below, originally built in 1904 as a swimming pool for the Earl of Plymouth, who owned St Fagans at the time.
