= Hendre'r-ywydd Uchaf Farmhouse =

Building re-erected at St Fagans National Museum of History, Cardiff, Wales

Coordinates: 51.4871°N 3.2767°W

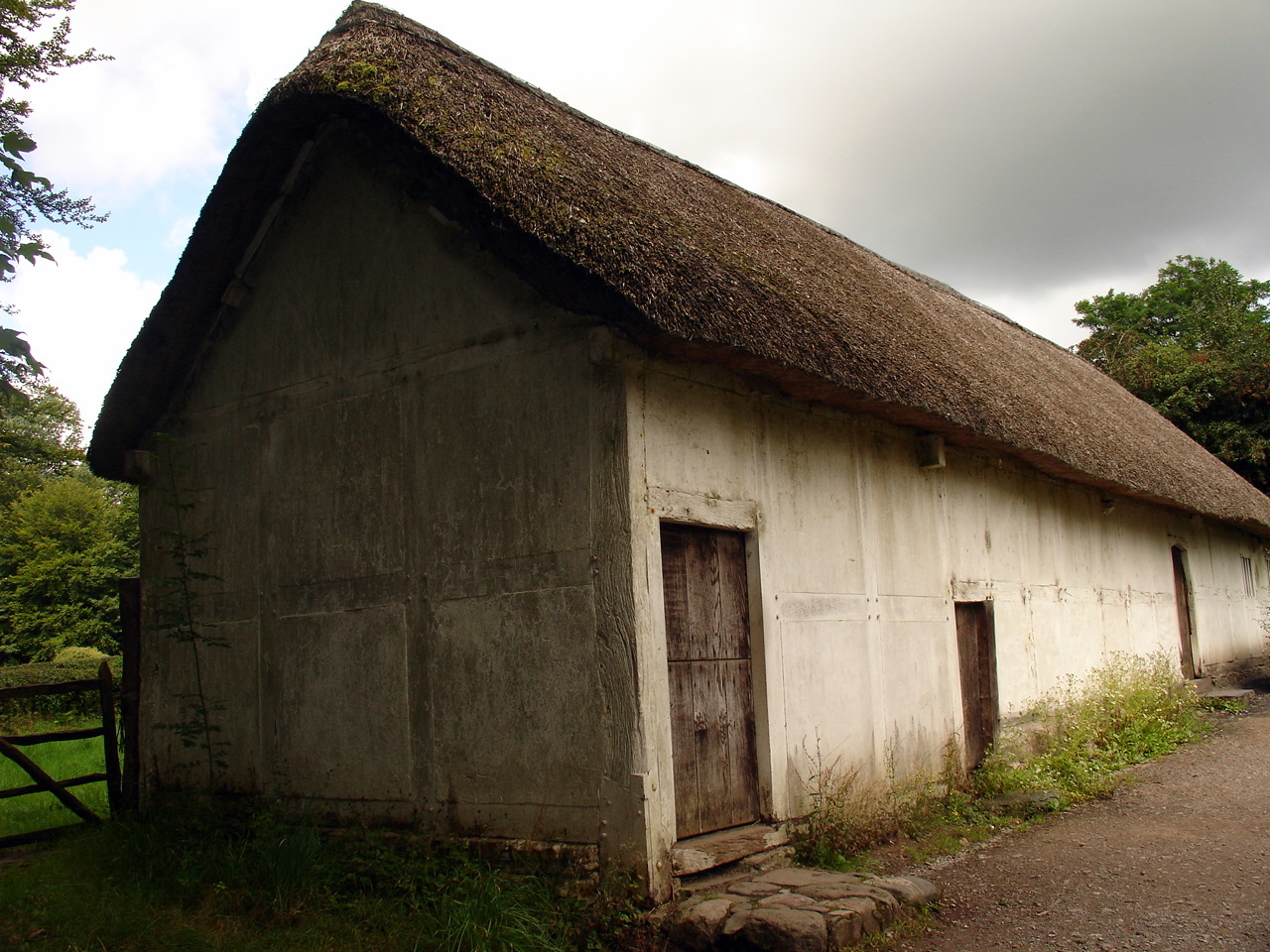
Hendre'r Ywydd Uchaf farmhouse

Hendre'r Ywydd Uchaf is an early 16th-century cruck house, originally constructed near Llangynhafal, Denbighshire, and now located at St Fagans National History Museum in Cardiff, Wales. One of the interior wooden beams has been dated to the year 1508, using dendrochronology. The house has five bays, two of which would have been used for livestock, and an open hearth. It was designated a Grade II listed building on 10 June 1977.

The walls of the house are timber-framed with oak stakes bound together by a wattle-and-daub construction. The roof is thatched with wheat straw. There is an earth floor and unglazed windows.

The house was moved to St Fagans in 1956 and opened to the public in 1962, becoming the seventh building to be reconstructed on the site.
