= Denbigh Cockpit =

Building re-erected at St Fagans National Museum of History, Cardiff, Wales

Cockpit
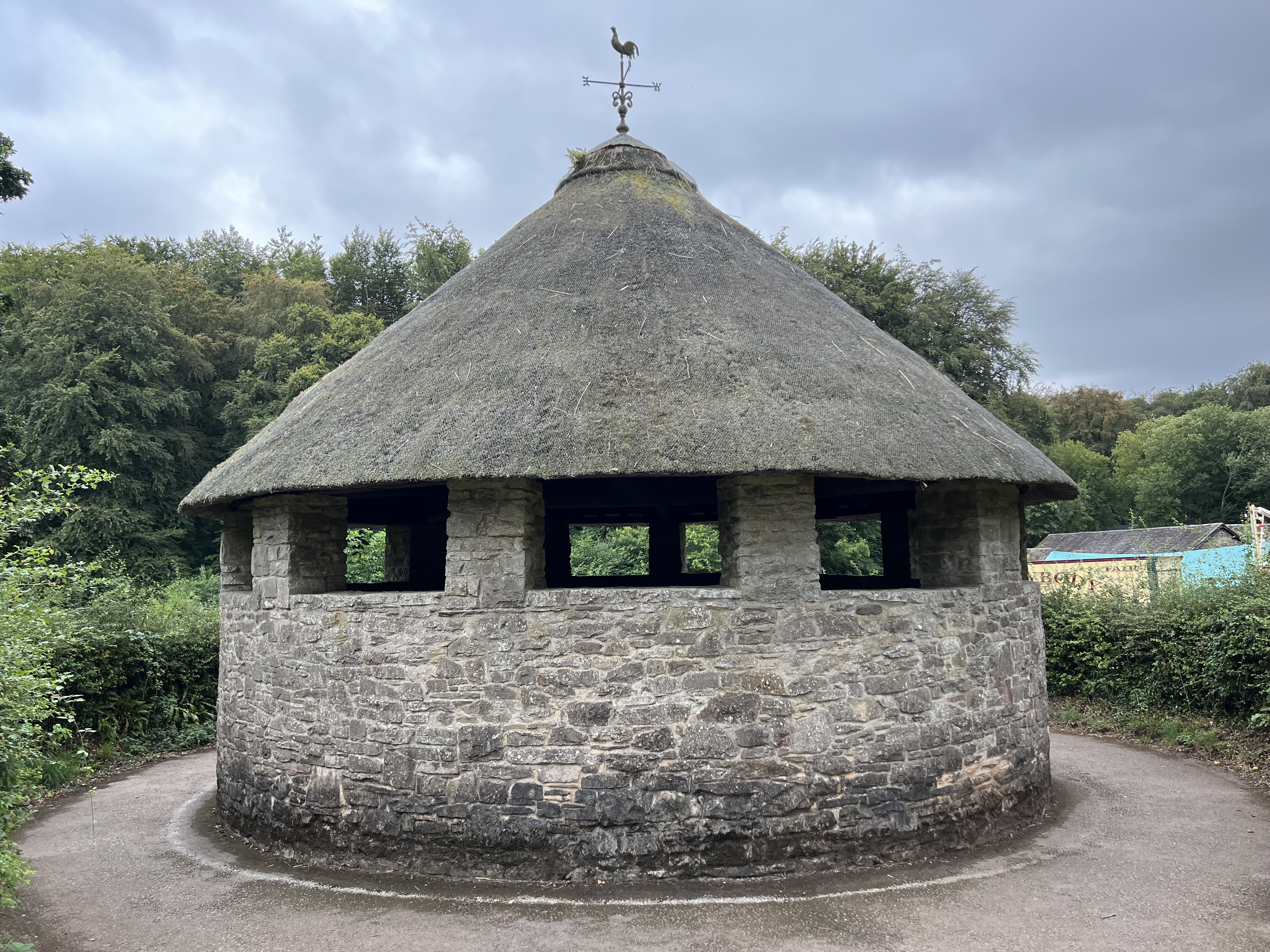
- Location: St Fagans National Museum of History, Cardiff
- Coordinates: 51.4876°N 3.27736°W
- Built: Late 17th century
- Rebuilt: 1965

Listed Building – Grade II
- Official name: Denbigh Cockpit
- Designated: 10 June 1977
- Reference no.: 13856

Denbigh Cockpit is a reconstructed building at St Fagans National Museum of History in Cardiff, the capital of Wales. The cockpit formerly stood in the yard of the Hawk and Buckle Inn at Vale Street, Denbigh, and is thought to date from the late seventeenth century. It is a Grade II listed building.

Cockfighting became illegal in Britain in 1849, and the cockpit was used for other purposes over the years, such as a garage. In 1911, it was visited by members of the Royal Commission on the Ancient and Historical Monuments and Constructions in Wales and Monmouthshire, and note that it was "preserved with much care". By 1965, it was in a poor state of repair, leading to the decision to relocate it to St Fagans. The cockpit was opened to the public at St Fagans in 1970.
