= Kennixton Farmhouse =

Building re-erected at St Fagans National Museum of History, Cardiff, Wales

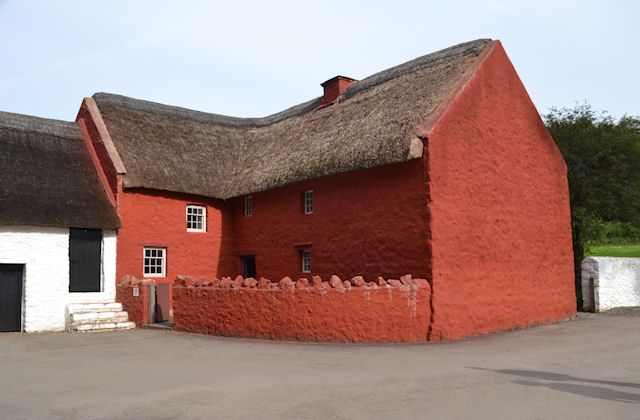
- Kennixton Farmhouse in 2012 after the farm buildings were added
- Interactive map of Kennixton Farmhouse
- 51.4871°N 3.2749°W
- Location: St Fagans National History Museum, Cardiff

History
- Built: 1610, 1680 and c. 1750
- Rebuilt: 1952

Listed Building – Grade II
- Official name: Kennixton Farmhouse
- Designated: 10 June 1977
- Reference no.: 13850

Kennixton Farmhouse is a 17th-century farmhouse originally built at Kennexstone, Llangennith, Gower, and currently located at St Fagans National History Museum, Cardiff, Wales. It is a Grade II listed building.

The house was built around 1610, and extended over a period. Inside can be seen an example of a box-bed or "cupboard bed" and a sleeping platform over the fireplace, typical of houses in the Gower peninsula at this period. Its exterior walls are painted a bright red; the original pigment included ox blood and lime and may have been intended as a kind of charm against witches. Another theory is that it simply showed that the family were rich enough to be able to afford this type of pigment.

The main living room or "kitchen" is an addition, dating from around 1680, as is the wooden staircase and sleeping area above it. The walls of the dining room (originally the only ground-floor room) are painted with a stencilled decoration of a type which pre-dates the general use of wallpaper. This room was used as the interior of Captain Blamey's cottage in the filming of the BBC's 2015 drama series, Poldark.

The farmhouse was donated to the museum (then called the Welsh Folk Museum) in 1951 by its then owner, Mr J B Rogers. It was one of the first properties to be rebuilt at the museum, which opened in 1948, and finance for carrying out the work was provided by the profits from the 1951 Festival of Britain. The farm buildings (the barn and calves cotts) that originally stood by the house were not originally, but were added when they were donated to the museum in the early 2000s and relocated to St Fagans.

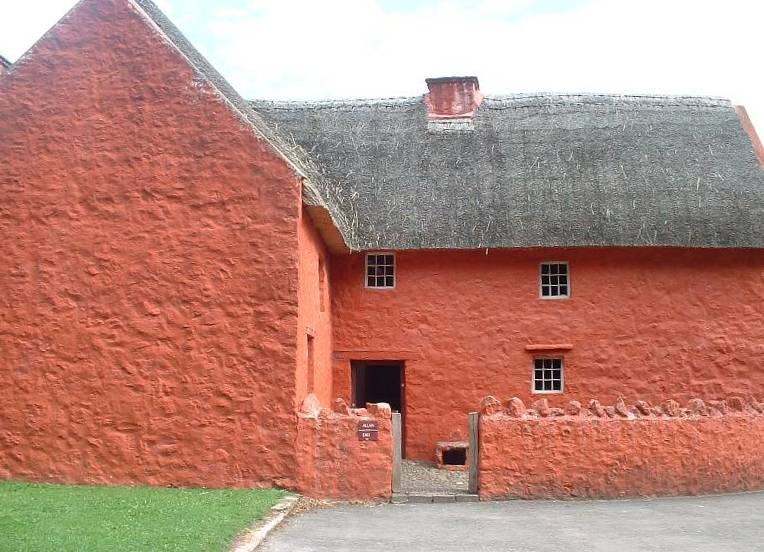
Kennixton Farmhouse in 2007, before the farm buildings were added

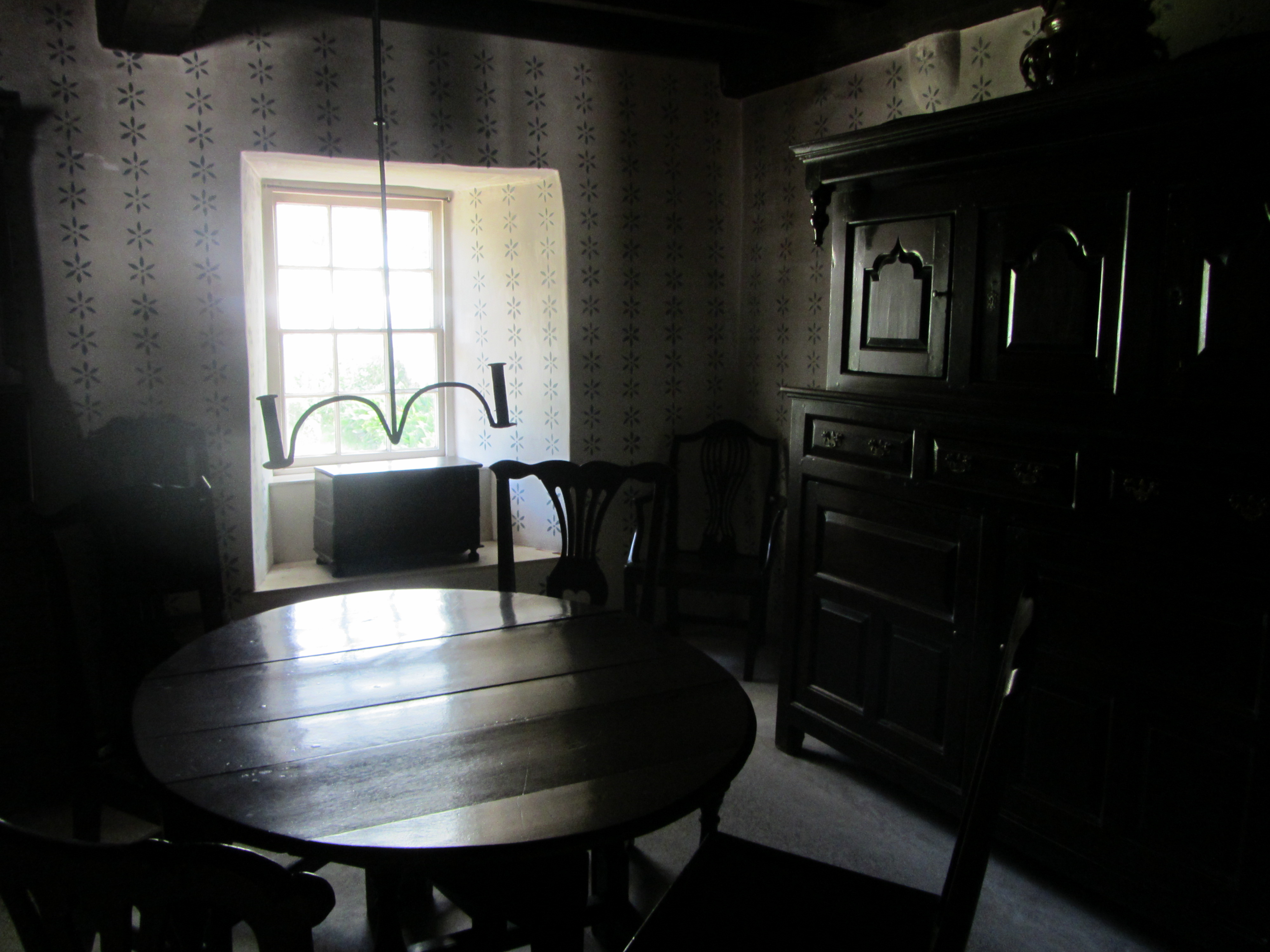
Interior of Kennixton Farmhouse showing stencilled wall decoration

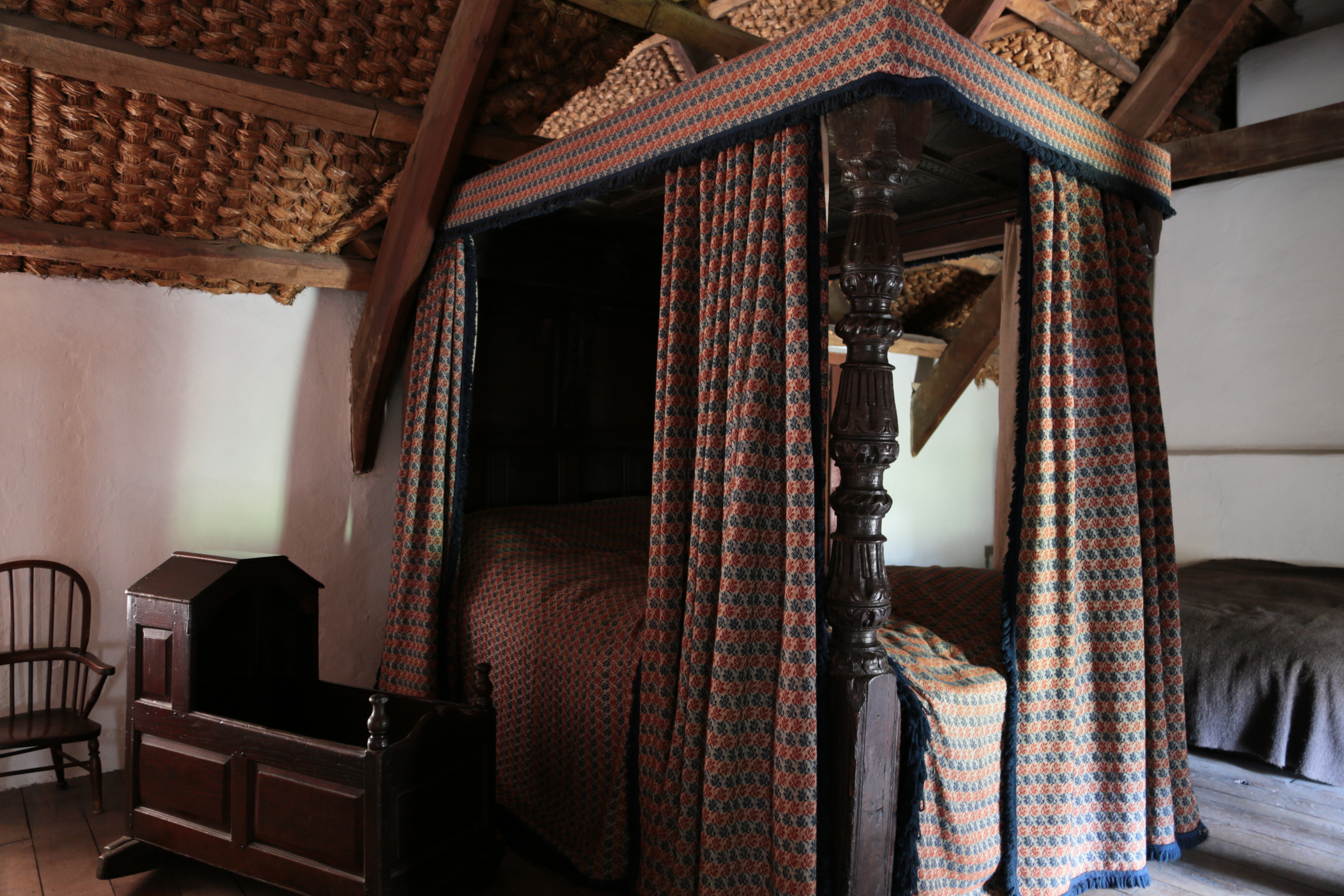
Four-poster bed and cot (left)

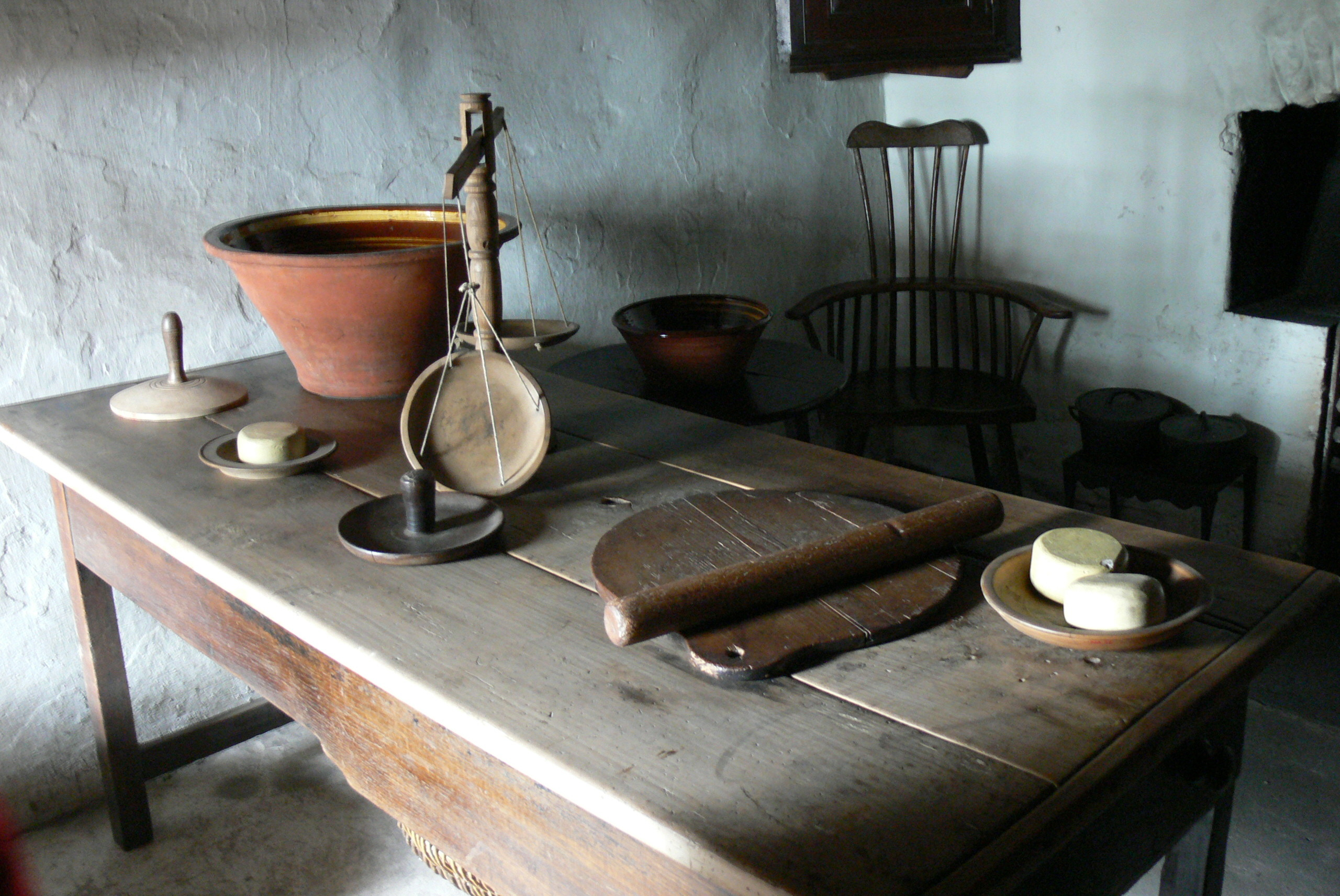
Kitchen table
