= Iorwerth Peate =

Welsh writer; founder of the St Fagans National Museum of History

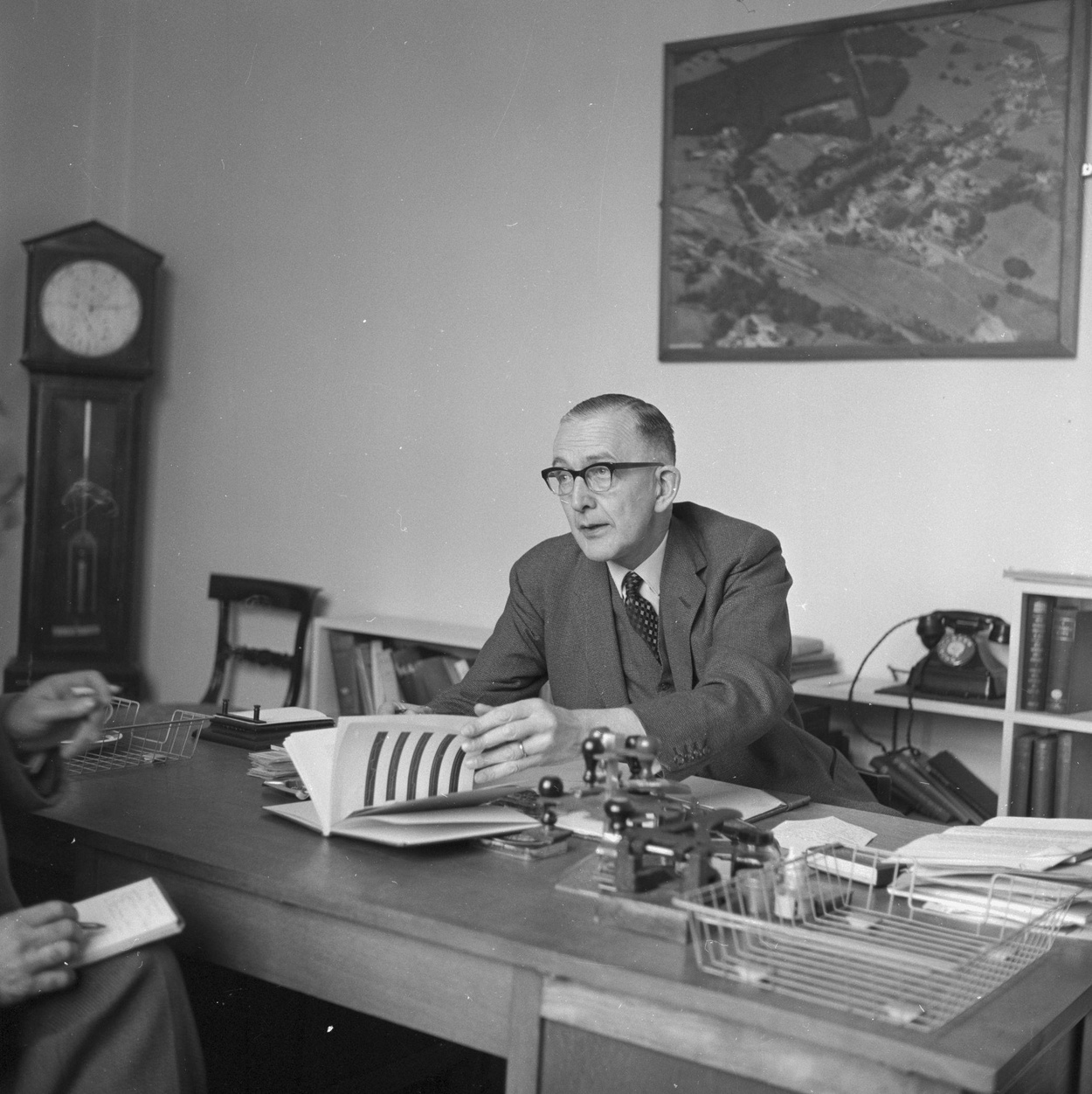
Iorwerth C. Peate at the Welsh Folk Museum in 1962

Iorwerth Cyfeiliog Peate (27 February 1901 – 19 October 1982) was a Welsh poet and scholar, best known as the founder, along with Cyril Fox, of St Fagans National Museum of History.

Iorwerth Cyfeiliog Peate was born on 27 February 1901 in Llanbrynmair, Montgomeryshire, the son of George Howard and Elizabeth Peate (née Thomas). His father and grandfather were carpenters. He attended Llanbryn-Mair Elementary School and Machynlleth Grammar School, and in 1918 entered the University College of Wales, Aberystwyth (now Aberystwyth University).

Peate's interest in folk studies and anthropology was kindled when studying Colonial History and Geography at Aberystwyth under professor Herbert John Fleure and writer T. Gwynn Jones. Peate received an M.A. in 1924 for a dissertation on the anthropology, dialect and folklore of the people living in the Dyfi valley. While studying at Aberystwyth, Peate won university prizes for his poetry and for his participation in the eisteddfod.

Peate began his career by lecturing in rural Ceredigion and Meirioneth, before being appointed in 1927 to catalogue the National Museum of Wales' folk collections.

Inspired by the open-air museums of Scandinavia, Peate had a vision of recreating this style of attraction for Welsh life and culture. His initial attempts were challenged by those outside and inside the academic world. Work on the museum commenced in 1946, in the grounds of St Fagans Castle on the outskirts of Cardiff donated by the Earl of Plymouth. The museum opened in 1948 as the Welsh Folk Museum, and it is now the St Fagans National Museum of History. Peate was Keeper-in-Charge (later Curator) of the museum from its opening until 1971.

Peate published work on the study of folk life in both English and Welsh, and wrote a regular review column for the Welsh-language newspaper Y Cymro. He was a pacifist who registered as a conscientious objector in 1941 and believed in a monoglot Welsh-speaking Wales.

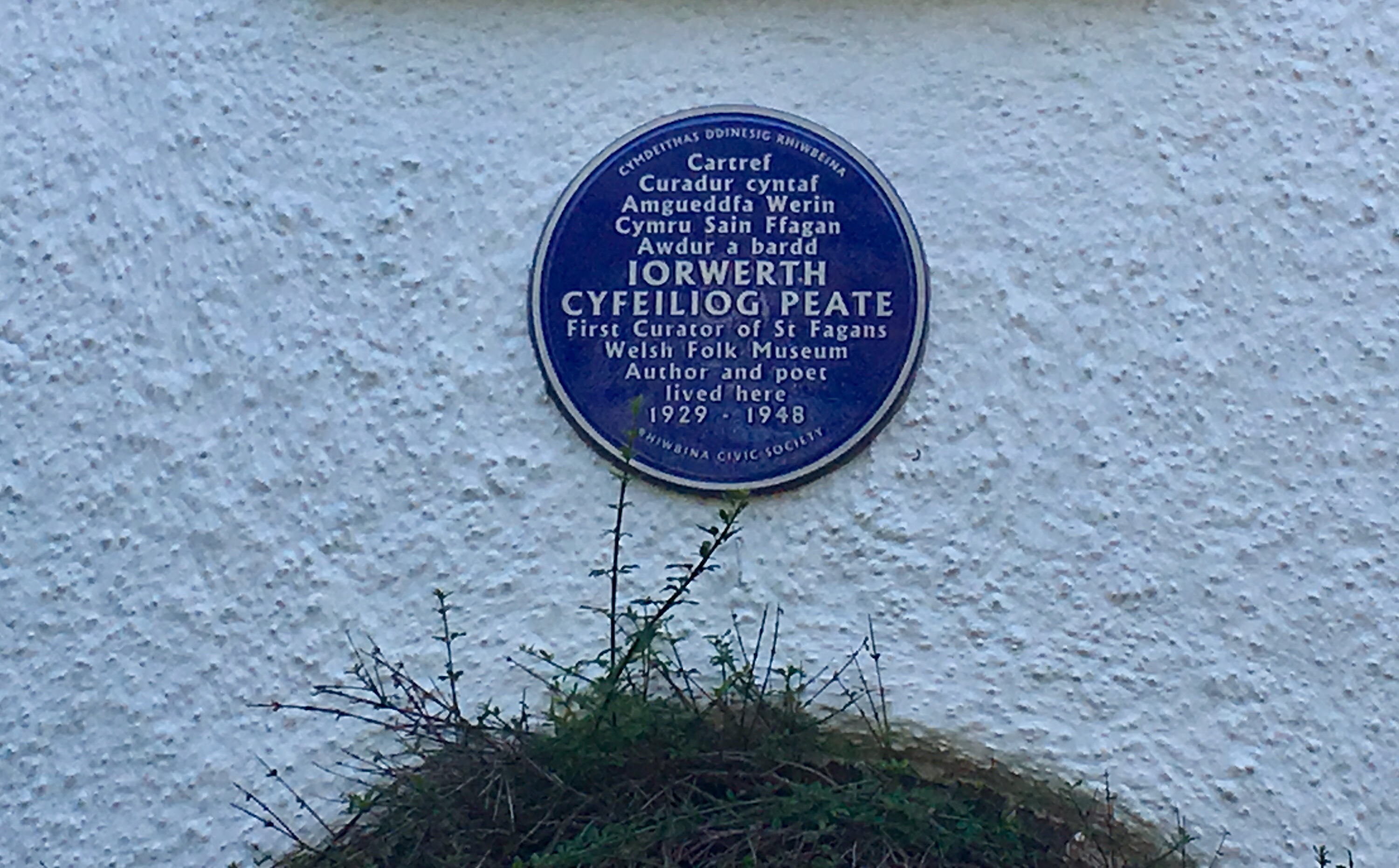
Blue plaque on Peate's house

Peate was a judge for the National Eisteddfod for a number of years.

Peate received a number of honours over his life. He was awarded an honorary doctorate by both the National University of Ireland and the University of Wales. He declined a 1963 New Years honour appointment as an Officer of the Most Excellent Order of the British Empire (OBE).

In 1929 Peate married Nansi (Ann) Davies (1900–1986), whom he had met when they were students at Aberystwyth. They had one son. They lived in Rhiwbina Garden Village in Cardiff, where there is a blue plaque in his honour.

The ashes of Peate and of his wife Nansi are buried in the grounds of Pen Rhiw Unitarian chapel in St Fagans National Museum of History.

== Published works ==
- Gyda'r wawr (1923)
- Guide to the Collection of Welsh Bygones (1929)
- Cymru a'i phobl (1931)
- Y crefftwr yng Nghymru (1933)
- Guide to the Collection Illustrating Welsh Folk Crafts and Industries (1935)
- Welsh Society and Eisteddfod Medals and Relics (1938)
- The Welsh House: a Study in Folk Culture (1940)
- Diwylliant gwerin Cymru (1942)
- Clock and Watch Makers in Wales (1945)
- Y Deyrnas Goll a cherddi eraill (1947)
- Ym mhob pen: ysgrifau (1948)
- Canu Chwarter Canrif (1957)
- Tradition and Folk Life: a Welsh View (1972)
- Diwylliant Gwerin Cymru (1975)
- Rhwng Dau Fyd (1976)
- Personau (1982)
