= Newtown, Cardiff =

Newtown
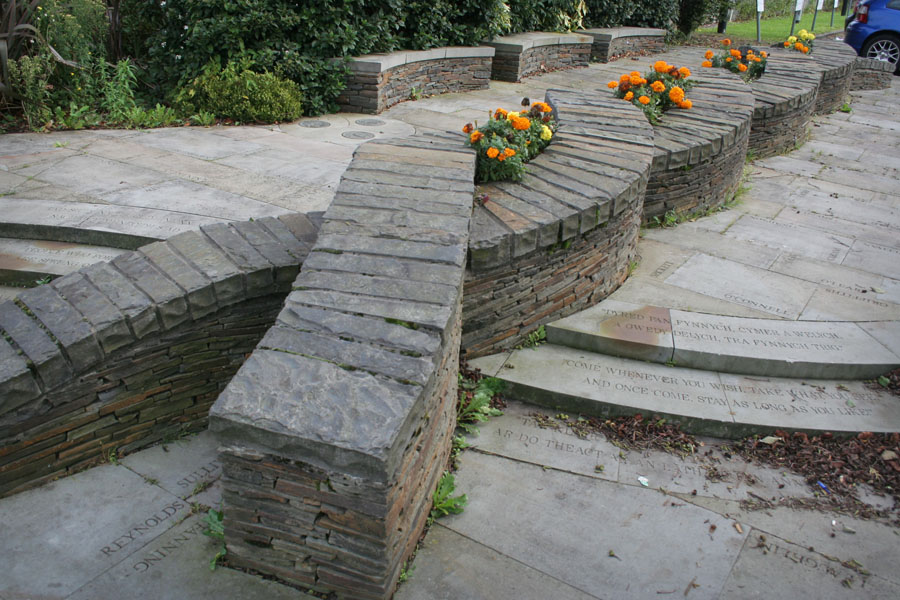
- Newtown Memorial Garden, Tyndall Street

- Newtown location within Cardiff
- Coordinates: 51.4772°N 3.1690°W
- Country: Wales
- City: Cardiff
- Established: 1840s

Newtown was a residential area of Cardiff, Wales that was also known as 'Little Ireland' because of its population of Irish families. Its six streets and 200 houses existed from the mid-nineteenth century until they were demolished in 1970. It was known as one of the "5 towns of Cardiff", the others being Butetown, Crockherbtown, Grangetown and Temperance Town.

== History ==
The areas later known as Newtown and Adamsdown were the first significant areas of housing that developed outside of Cardiff's old town boundaries in the early nineteenth century, clearly evident by the 1830s. In the years following the Great Famine of Ireland of 1845 hundreds of Irish families began to arrive in Cardiff, often travelling as 'ballast' in ships from Cork and Waterford. They were generally housed in Newtown, which had been purposely expanded by the Marquess of Bute to house construction workers for Cardiff's new docks. In 1850 the South Wales Railway (from Swansea to Chepstow) had been opened, separating Adamsdown from Newtown. Newtown came to consist of six streets – Ellen Street, North Williams Street, Pendoylan Street and Pendoylan Place, Roland Street, Rosemary Street – immediately south of the railway and north of Tyndall Street. A footbridge gave access over the railway.

Newtown became known as 'Little Ireland'.

Cardiff's first race riot occurred in Newtown in 1848. A Welshman, Thomas Lewis, had been stabbed to death by an Irishman, John Connors. Welsh mobs took the law into their own hands and headed to Newtown to find the culprit. At Lewis's funeral Irishmen with pick axes had to stand guard to ward off any further trouble.

By the 1930s, Newtown had already deteriorated to slum conditions.

Eventually, in 1966 the houses were compulsorily purchased in anticipation of the redevelopment of the old dock areas. In 1970 the houses were demolished.

The site became a trading estate. In 2010 this in turn had been demolished. It was anticipated the area would be redeveloped for mixed-use, with new housing and offices.

One of the last original remnants of Newtown, The Vulcan public house on Adam Street (originally Whitmore Lane, Newtown), was demolished in 2012 with plans to rebuild it at St Fagans National History Museum.

On 11 May 2024 the Vulcan reopened.

== Notable people ==
- 'Peerless' Jim Driscoll, a famous Welsh boxer, born in Newtown in 1880.

== Memorial garden ==
In 1999 Cardiff Bay Development Corporation gave £10,000 toward the cost of a memorial to commemorate the Newtown community. The Newtown Memorial Garden was created, opened on 20 March 2005. It contains a large stone 'knotwork' sculpture by local artist David Mackie.
