= Capel Pen Rhiw =

Building re-erected at St Fagans National Museum of History, Cardiff, Wales

Coordinates: 51°29′16″N 3°16′24″W

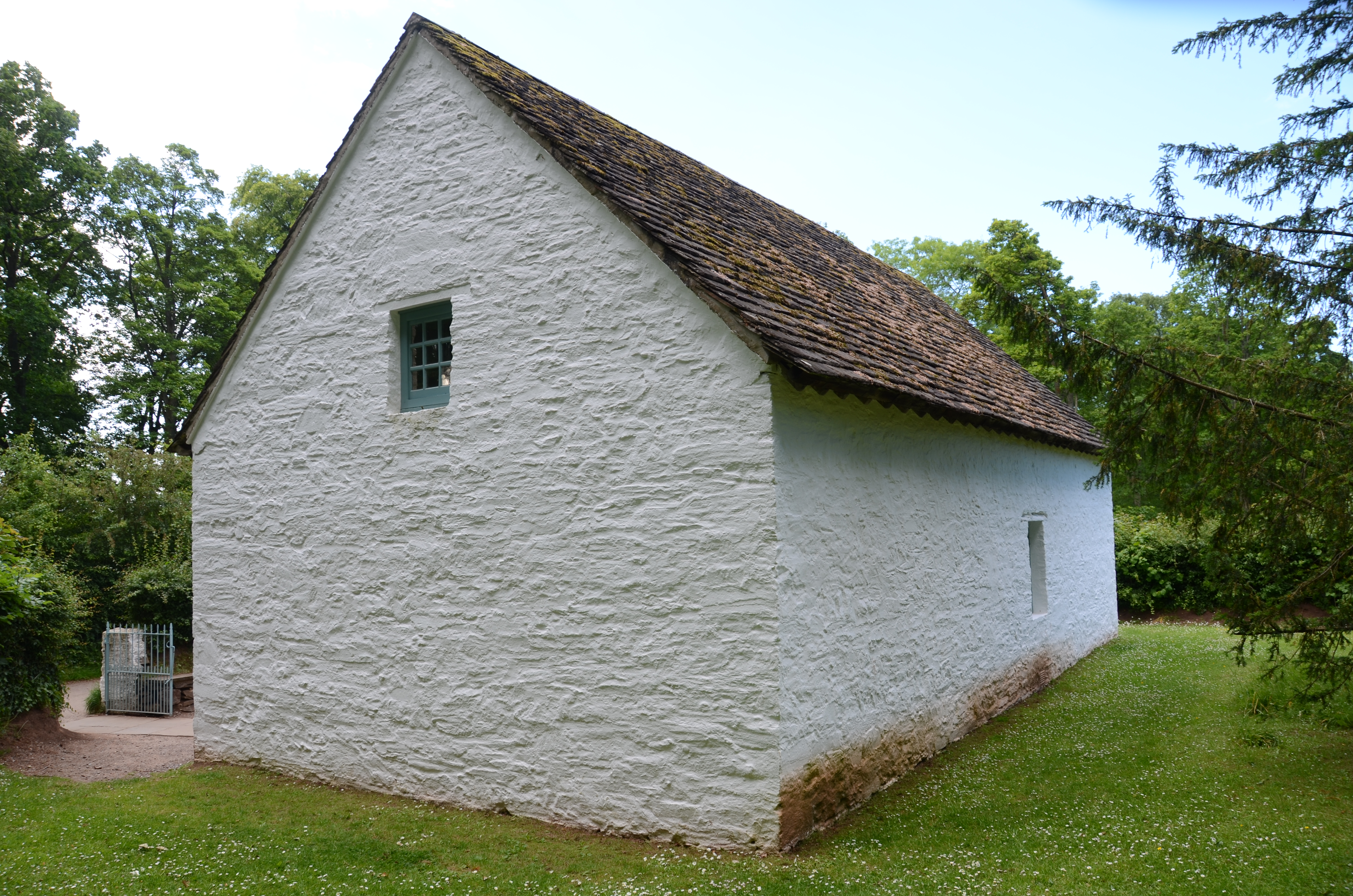
Capel Pen Rhiw in its present location at St Fagans

Capel Pen Rhiw (also called Pen Rhiw Unitarian Chapel, is a Grade II listed building, originally built in 1777, on a hill overlooking Dre-fach Felindre, a village in Carmarthenshire, Wales. It is thought to have been converted from a barn. The loft became a gallery with additional seating. Archaeological evidence suggests that it was formerly used as a schoolroom, probably by the Unitarians when it was not in use for services. The cemetery was left behind at the original site in Carmarthenshire, but the ashes of Iorwerth Peate, founder of the museum, and his wife are buried in the grounds of the chapel at St Fagans, along with those of his wife, Nansi, and their son is also commemorated on the memorial stone.

In 1953, after falling out of use as a place of worship, the building was dismantled and moved to St Fagans National Museum of History, where it quickly became one of the most popular visitor attractions when opened to the public in 1956. Services are still occasionally held at the chapel.

The chapel interior suggests that it was carefully planned. Although the walls are made of rubble and the floor of packed earth, the chapel was whitewashed and the roof was made of stone tiles, which were replaced when it was reconstructed at St Fagans, and the floor was covered by boards in places. Some of the pews on the ground floor were owned by local families who had paid to have them installed as their regular seating place. When the gallery was installed to increase the amount of seating, the pulpit was raised, and it is placed in front of the central window so that it would be the centre of attention and clearly visible to the congregation.

== Gallery: 1956 Chapel rebuilding and reopening ==
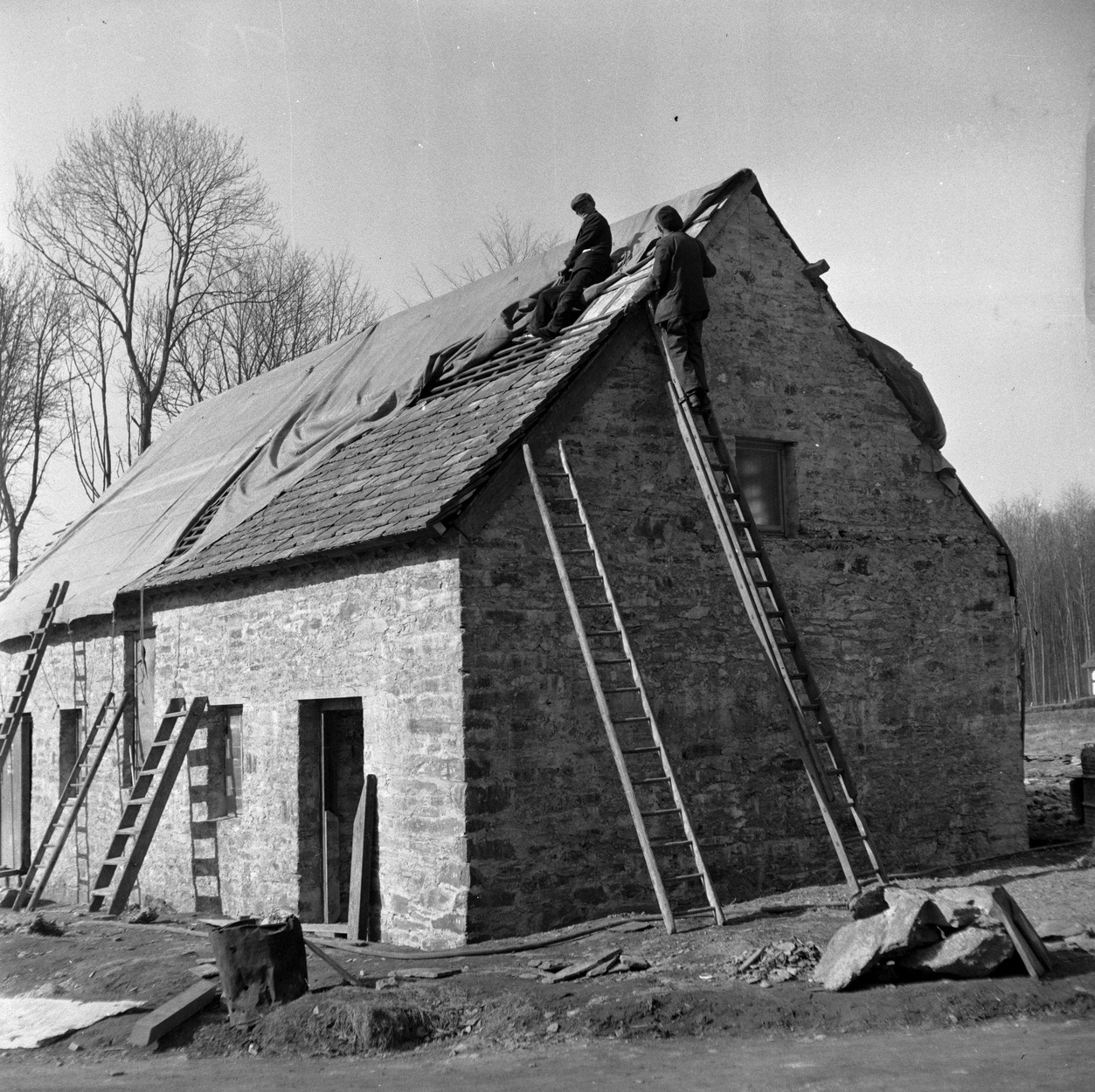
March 1956

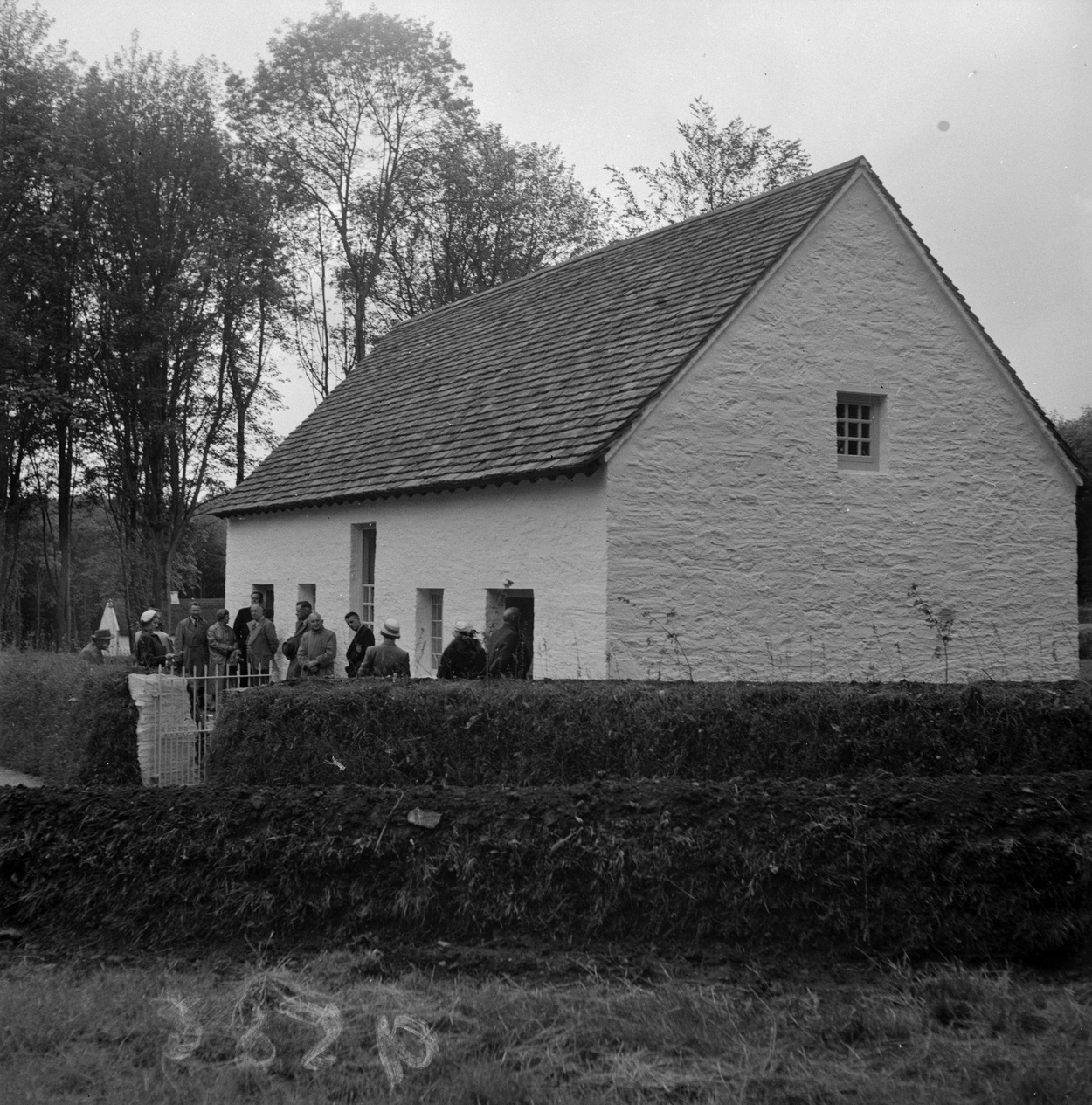
June 1956

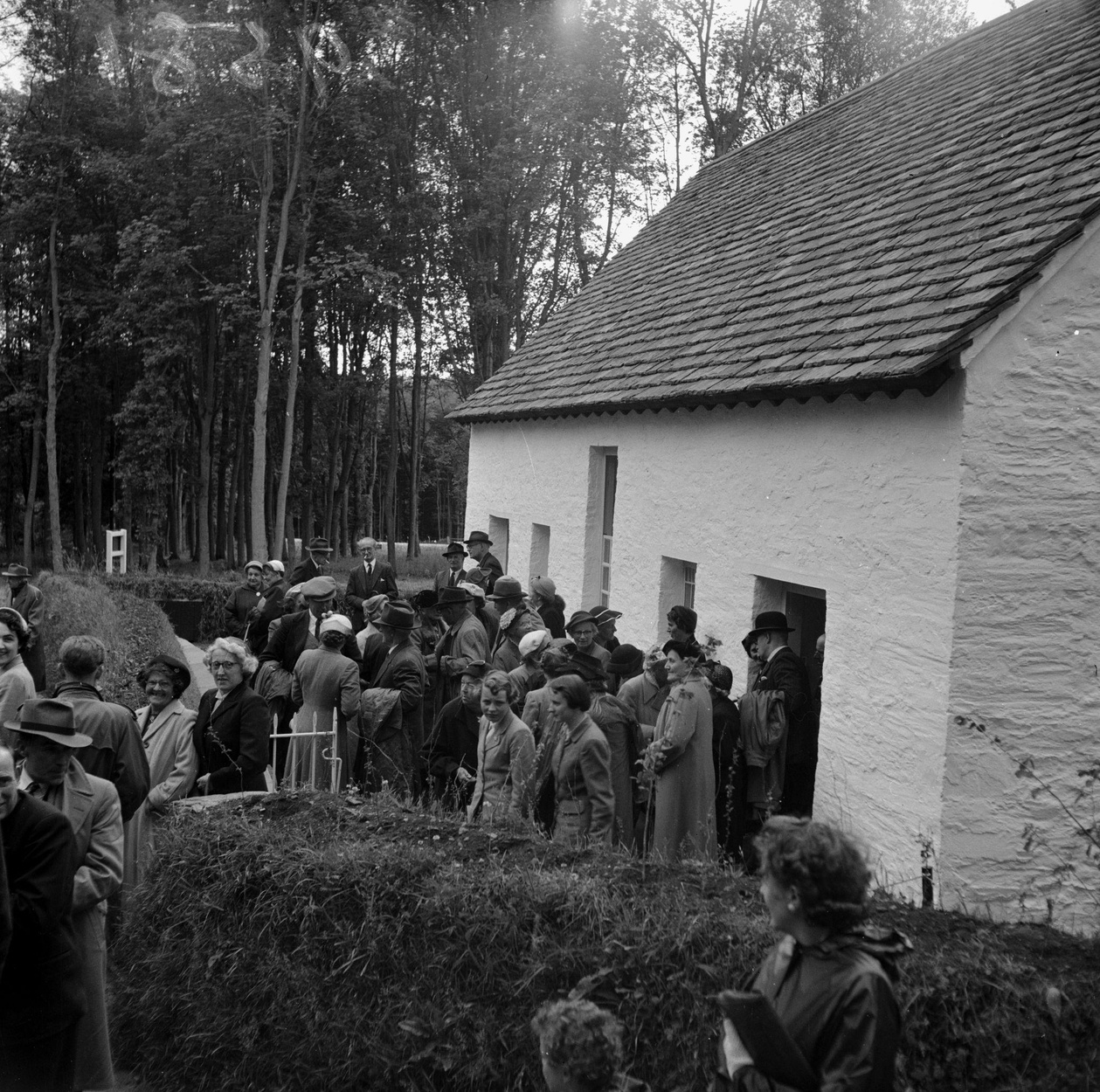
June 1956

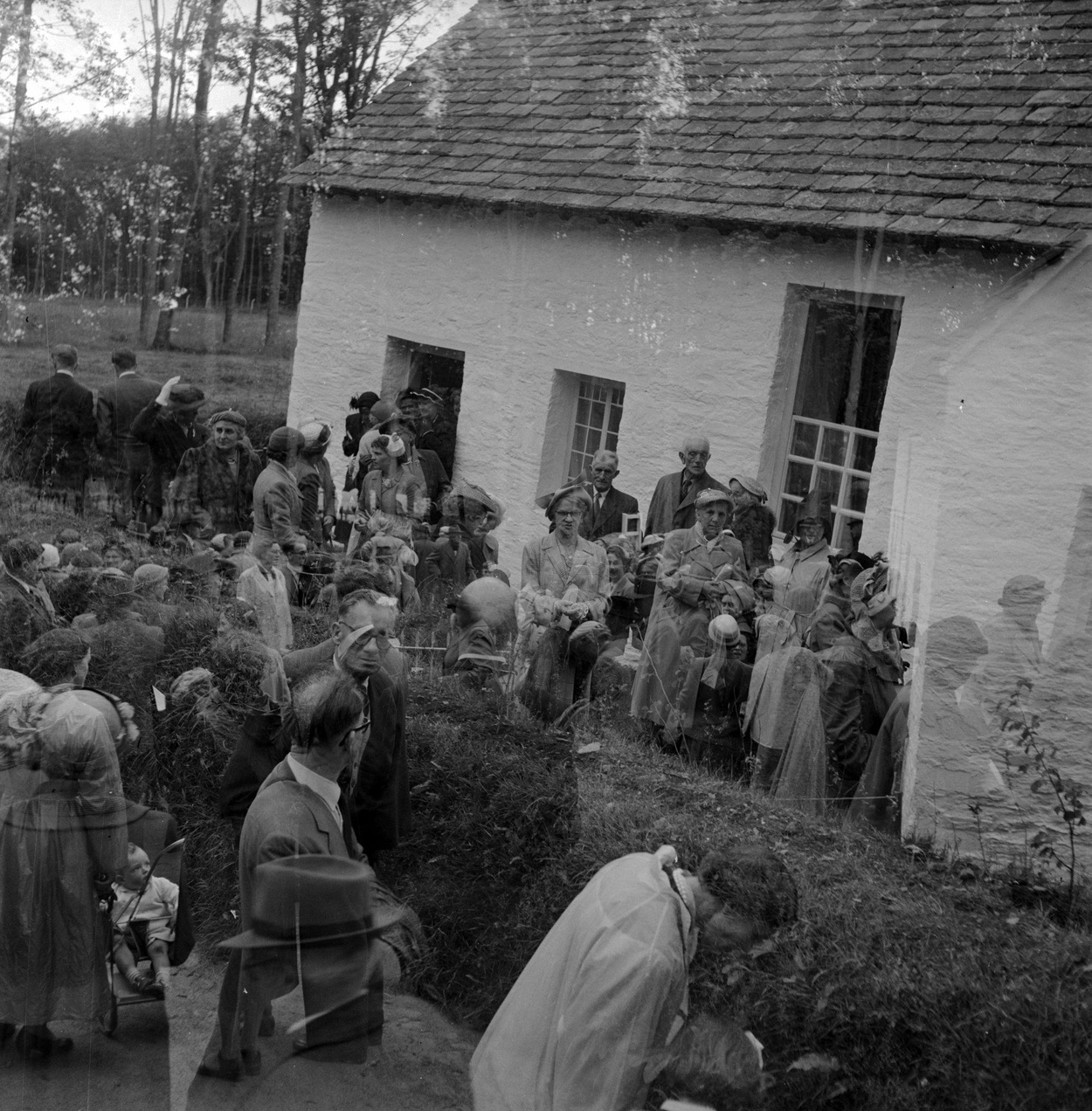
June 1956

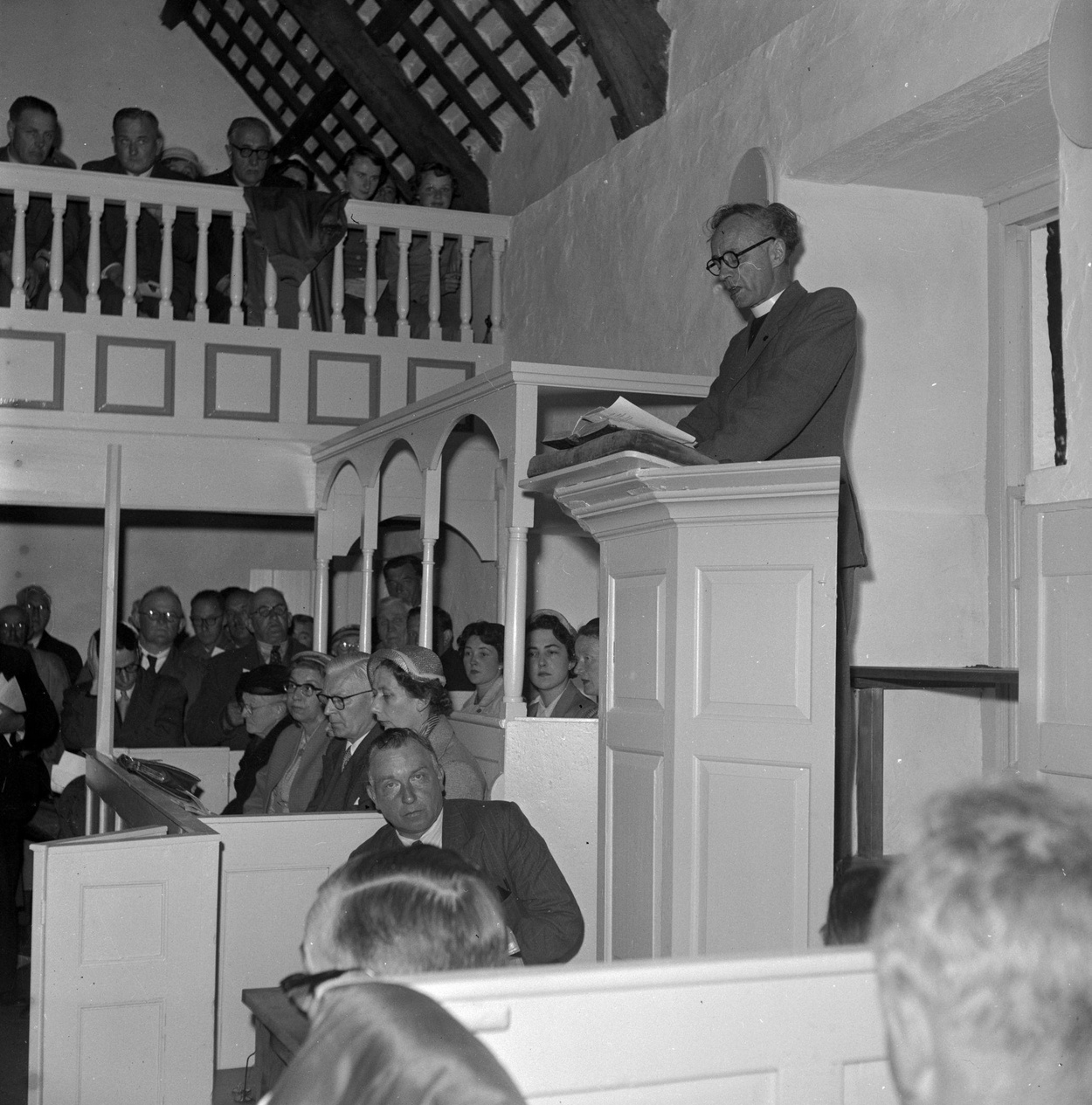
June 1956
