= St Teilo's Church, Llandeilo Tal-y-bont =

Building re-erected at St Fagans National Museum of History, Cardiff, Wales

Coordinates: 51°29′17″N 3°16′49″W

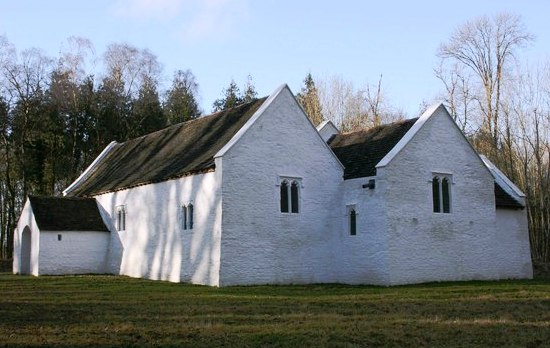
St Teilo's Church in its present setting at St Fagans

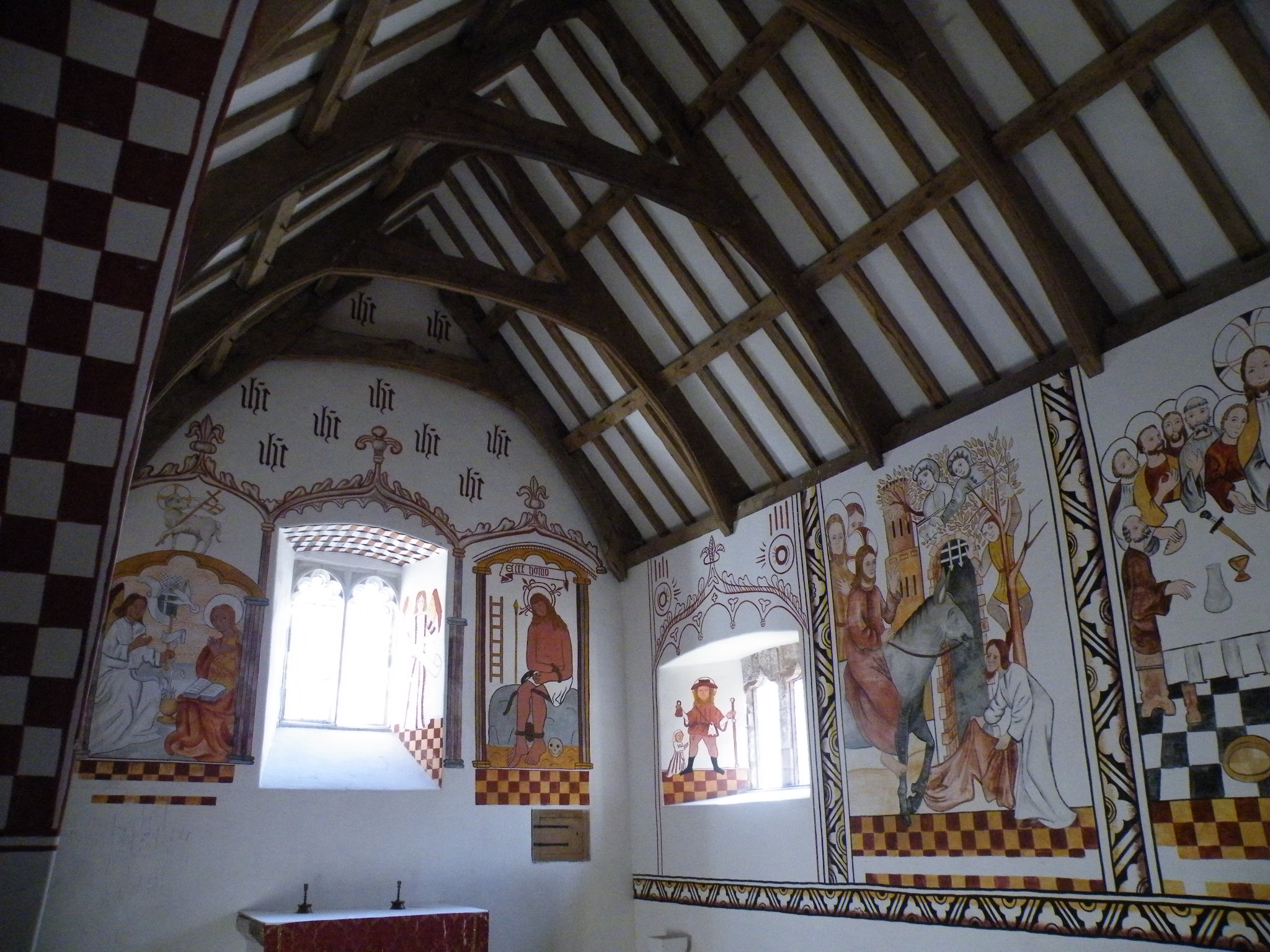
Interior of the church

St Teilo's Church is a historic building originally located at Llandeilo Tal-y-Bont near Pontarddulais and now reconstructed at St Fagans National History Museum in Cardiff, Wales.

== History ==
The church is thought to have been built in the 12th or 13th century. It was used regularly until 1850, subsequently used only for a few services during the summer months. As recently as the early 20th century, coracles were used by worshippers to reach the church in its location beside the River Loughor. It went out of use in 1970 and began to be demolished in 1984 in readiness for the move to St Fagans.

Prior to the removal of the church, wall paintings were discovered showing through in places beneath the plaster. When the church began to be dismantled, the paintings were first removed and preserved; the oldest of them was a mural of St Catherine, believed to date from the 15th century.

=== Reconstruction ===
It was rebuilt and redecorated as it would have appeared in about 1530. The new roof timbers were sourced from Northeast Wales and a new rood screen and a loft were carved from Radnorshire oak by the project's head carpenter, Ray Smith MBE.

The missing sections of the wall paintings were reconstructed from what was left. Around one-third of the paintings now displayed are reconstructions of those discovered under the wall-plaster, the originals having been preserved and held by the National Museum of Wales. The remainder were devised by experts, based on paintings known from other churches. One of the original paintings represented the Holy Trinity, with God the Father seated in majesty behind a crucifix. The head of the king is believed to be modelled on King Henry VIII of England, a theory supported by a representation on the opposite wall of Henry's seal.

The church was the 41st building to be opened to the public at the museum. It was officially reopened by the then Archbishop of Canterbury, Dr Rowan Williams, in 2007.
