= Tudor Trader House =

Building re-erected at St Fagans National Museum of History, Cardiff, Wales

Coordinates: 51.48722°N 3.27974°W

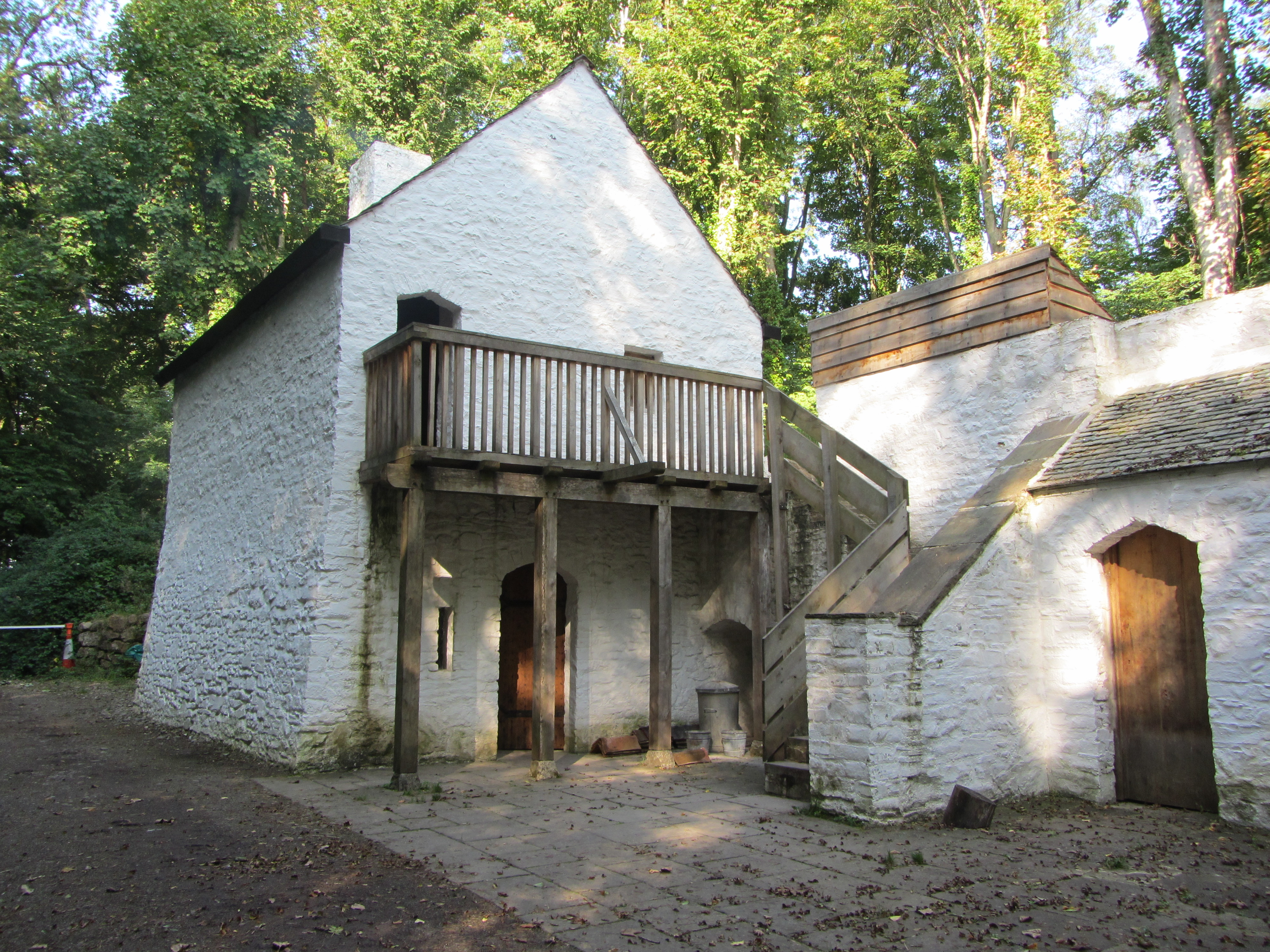
The Tudor trader's house in its present location at St Fagans

The Tudor Trader House is a 16th-century house originally constructed at Haverfordwest, Pembrokeshire, Wales, and now relocated at St Fagans National History Museum, Cardiff.

The house, which previously stood on a bank near Quay Street in Haverfordwest, was taken down during the 1980s and rebuilt at St Fagans in 2012 by the same group of men who dismantled it. Its original location suggests that it may have been the home and place of business of a merchant or trader. It is thought that the residents lived in a single room upstairs, with a sleeping loft above, and stored goods on the ground floor.

It is the 42nd building to be relocated at the museum, but only the second from Pembrokeshire.

The reconstructed house is furnished and decorated as it would have been in around 1580.
