= The Vulcan, Cardiff =

Public house in Cardiff, Wales

The Vulcan Hotel
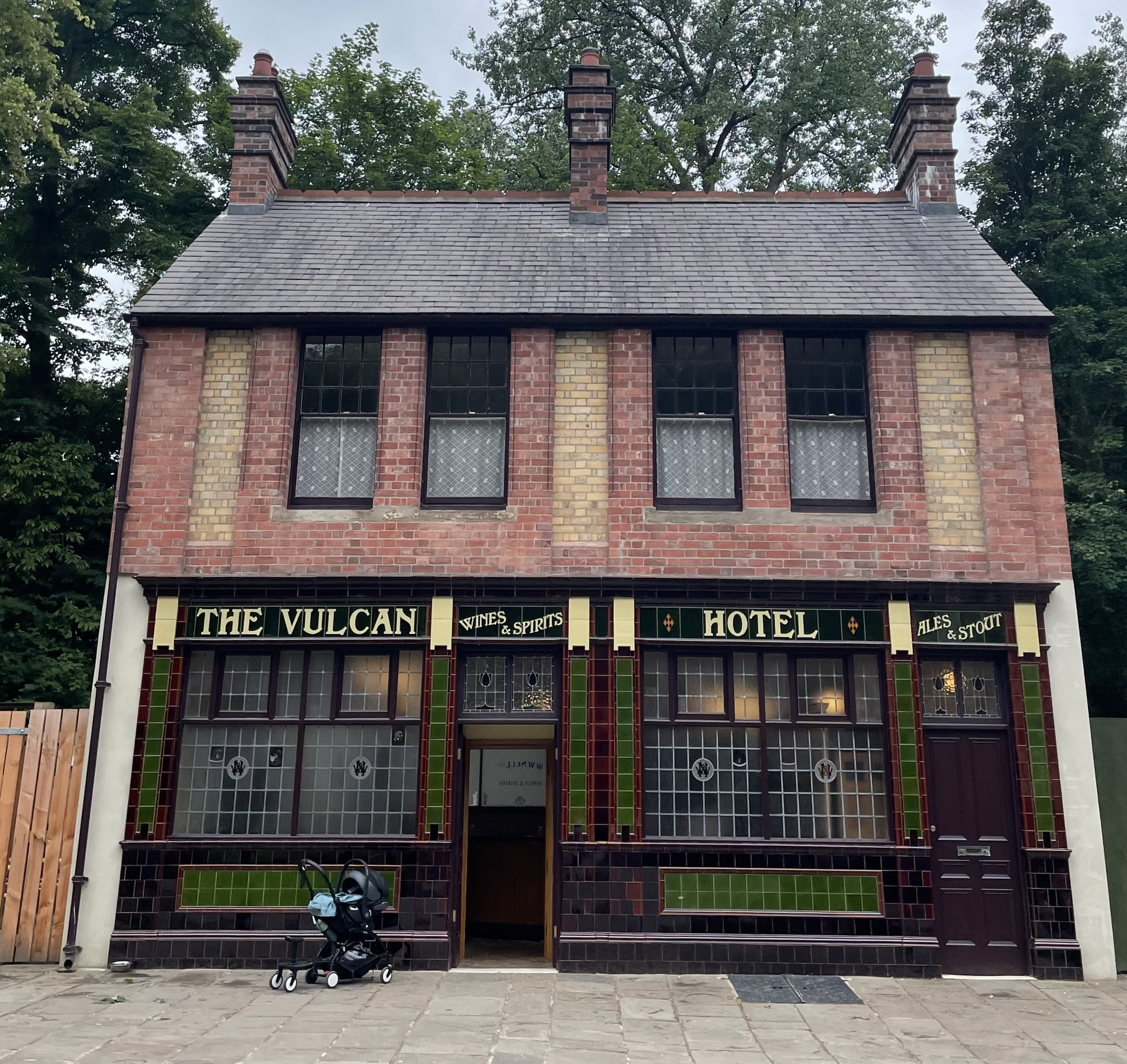
- The reconstructed Vulcan in 2024
- Interactive map of the The Vulcan Hotel area
- Alternative names: The Vulcan Pub

General information
- Type: Public House
- Location: St. Fagans National Museum of History, St. Fagans. CF5 6XB, Cardiff, Wales
- Coordinates: 51.478383°N 3.169052°W
- Completed: 1853
- Renovated: 11 May 2024 (reopened)
- Demolished: 2012 (deconstructed)

The Vulcan Hotel is a historic hotel and public house, that was located in Adam Street in the Adamsdown suburb of Cardiff, South Wales. Scheduled for demolition in 2009, after a long public campaign to preserve what had become one of Cardiff's oldest working public houses, in 2012 it was donated to the National History Museum at St Fagans. A decade-long reconstruction saw the pub reopen on 11 May 2024.

== History ==
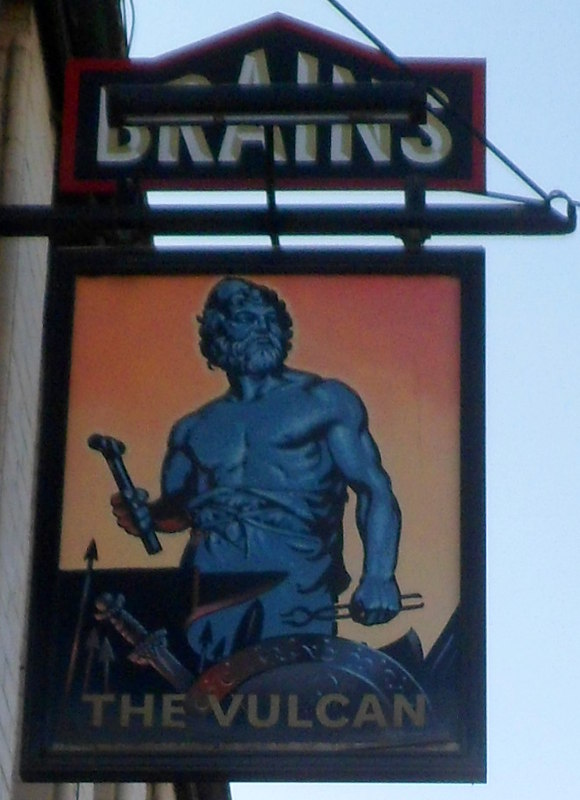
The Vulcan pub sign, February 2012

The Vulcan began life as two small, terraced houses that were later knocked through to form one larger building. It was first registered as an ‘ale house’ in 1853 and was called The Vulcan Inn. The original building appearing from 1830 onwards, in the early stages of the expansion of Cardiff and the development of the Adamsdown area of Cardiff, with an original address on Whitmore Lane, Newtown. The name Vulcan, the ancient Roman God of Fire, which it kept throughout its existence, referred to the nearby ironworks.

Close to the bustling railway station of Queen Street and within walking distance of Cardiff Gaol, the pub was south of the Newport Road in the suburb's working-class area. It was frequently busy over lunch times and in the early evening, patronised by working-class people, often of Irish descent.

The building was substantially rebuilt in about 1900, and internally refurbished in 1914 by local architect F. J. Veall, at which time the building was decorated throughout with green and brown ceramic tiles. With a functional and easy-to-clean internal style, while adjoining Victorian buildings were demolished and redeveloped, twice on one side, it remained untouched, both outside and in, except for an occasional coat of paint. The pub retained its brown ceramic urinals, although the rest of the interior was updated in the 1950s. Local writer John Williams commented in 2011:

The place is a total time warp. Inside it's forever 1975. The Brains beer is cheap, the toilets are outside in the rain, and the bikers come down to drink every Saturday lunchtime. It's full of Cardiff history.

The Vulcan was voted Cardiff Pub of the Year by the local branch of CAMRA in both 1997 and 2009.

== Demolition and re-erection ==
In 2009 Brains Brewery confirmed that they were to terminate their lease on the property. Site owner and freeholder, businessman Derek Rapport via his company Marcol Asset Management, had plans accepted at Cardiff Council for the demolition of the building and subsequent mixed-use redevelopment of the surrounding site, based around a multi-storey car park.

A local campaign began to protect what by then was one of Cardiff's oldest surviving original public houses. A petition was raised that gathered over 5,000 signatures, politicians lobbied, and celebrities including James Dean Bradfield of the Manic Street Preachers and actor Rhys Ifans actively supported the campaign and visited the premises. The Cardiff band Future of the Left recorded the video for their single The Hope That House Built on the premises. But Cadw declined to make the pub a listed building, due to the fact that it had been substantially rebuilt in the 1900s and that there were better surviving examples elsewhere. However, as a result of public pressure, the freeholders agreed to a three-year extension of the lease to Brains.

In early 2012, Brains confirmed that they would be terminating their lease when it expired in March 2012, stating that the business was commercially unviable. With the building again threatened with demolition, but still with a growing local media campaign to save the building, Marcol Asset Management agreed to donate the building to the St Fagans National Museum of History. Brains subsequently closed the pub as scheduled in May 2012, while the museum started an appeal for photographs, objects and stories relating to the Vulcan and its history.

The Vulcan prior to demolition, during demolition, and re-erection

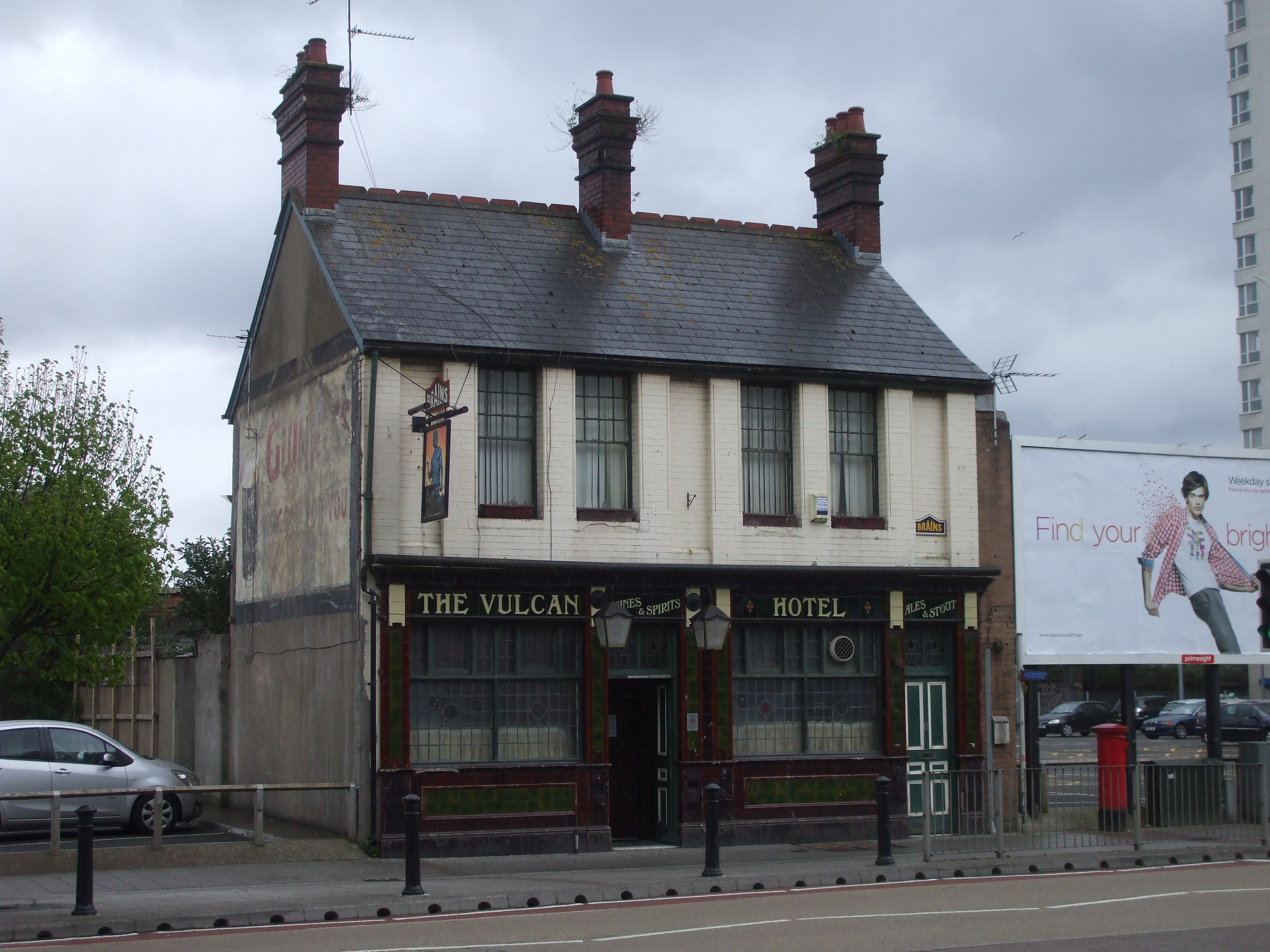
The Vulcan in 2008 in Adam Street

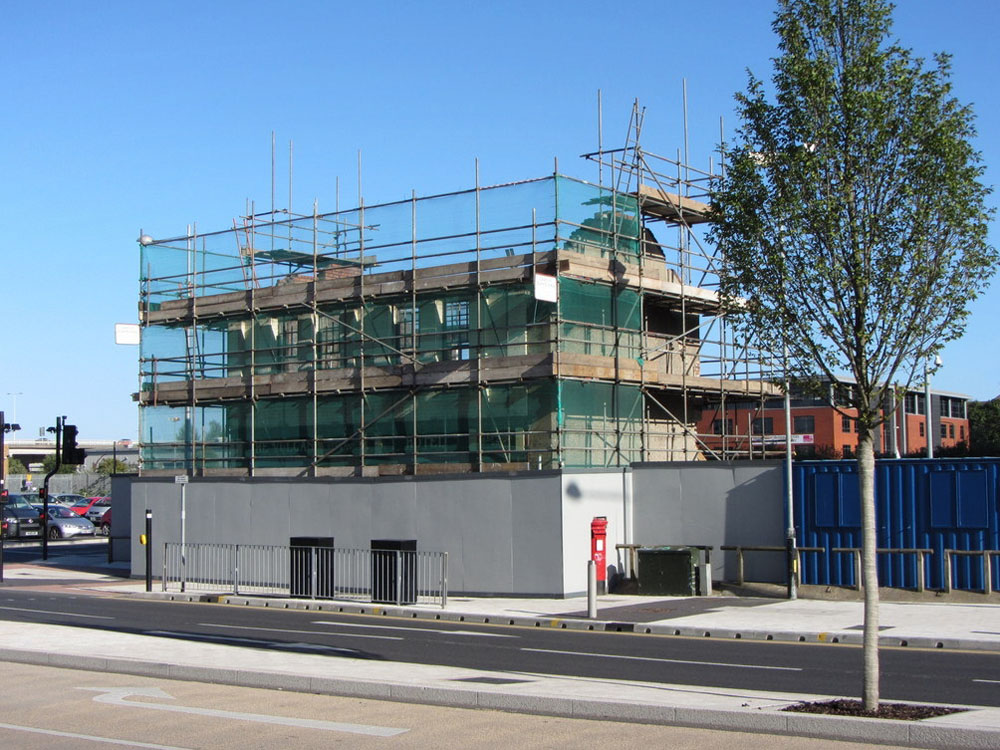
The Vulcan being dismantled in August 2012

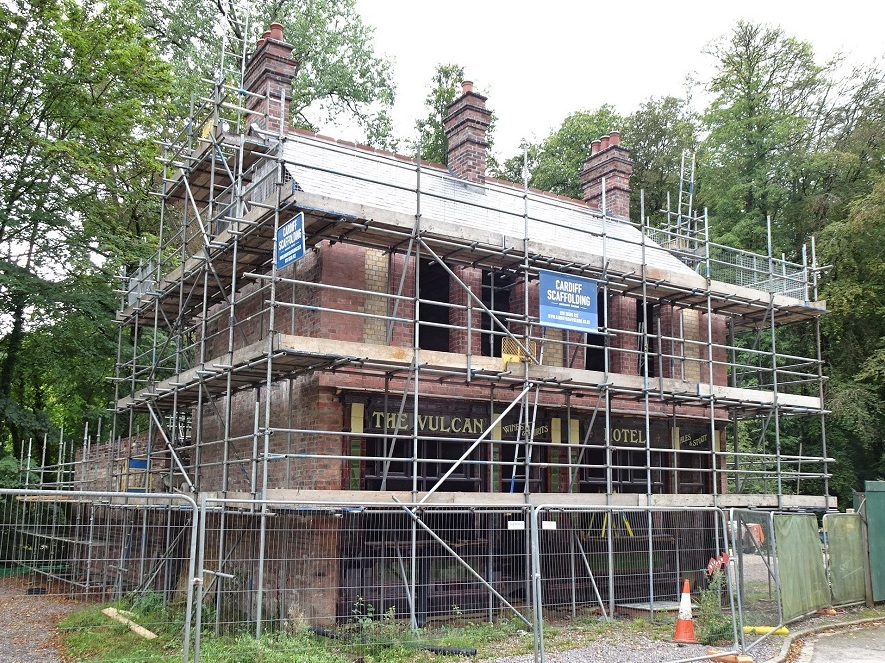
The Vulcan being re-erected in September 2022 in St Fagans National Museum of History

In July 2012, building contractors and preservationists were deployed by the National History Museum to start deconstruction of the building by hand, to allow brick by brick movement to St Fagans. By July 2013, the de-constructed parts of the building were held between the museum's sites at St Fagans and Nantgarw, awaiting planning permission for the building's reconstruction.

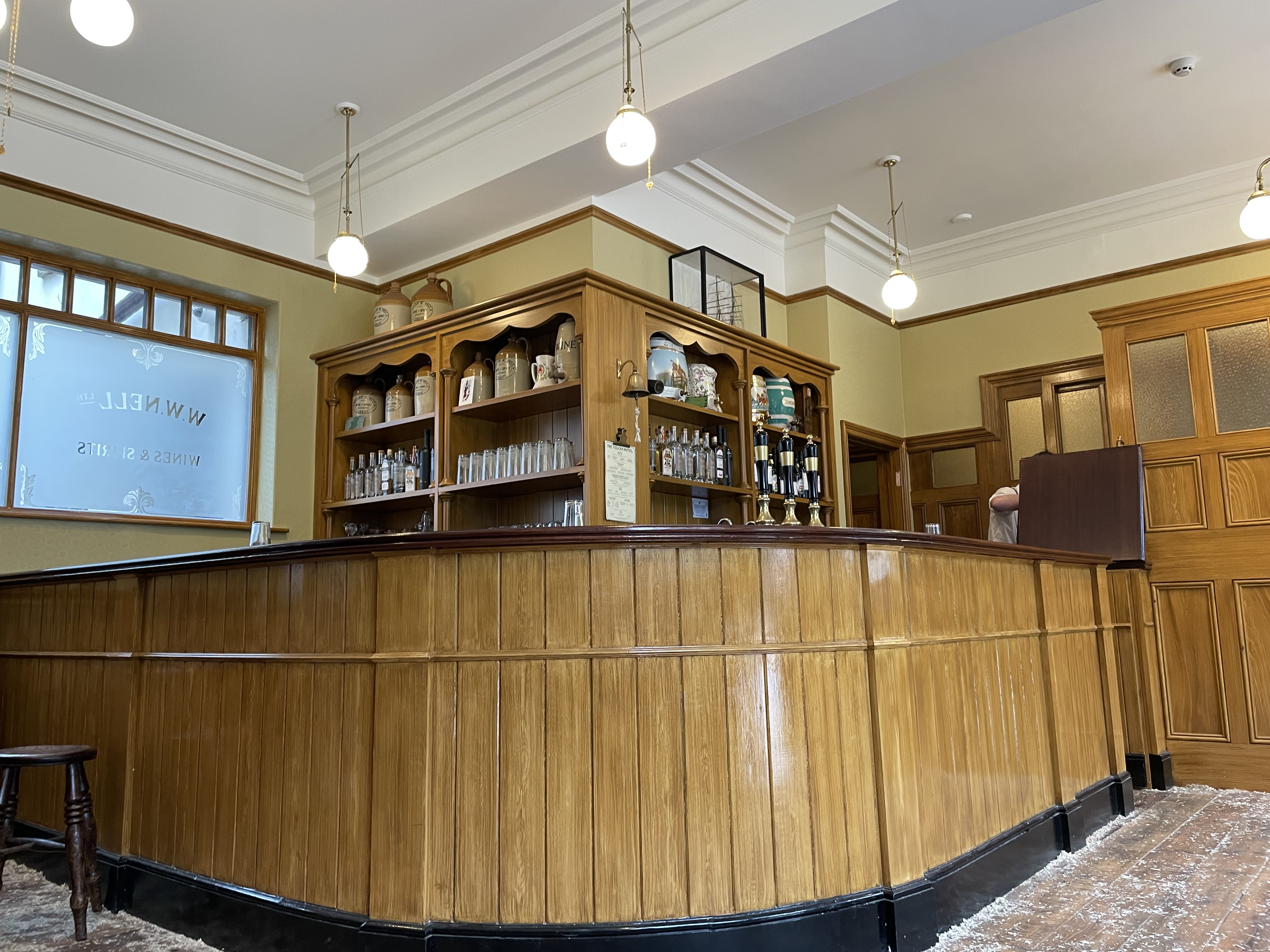
The bar inside the newly reconstructed Vulcan Pub in St Fagans

Originally planned to reopen in 2019, this was delayed. The pub has been restored to its appearance after refurbishment and redecoration in 1915 and re-opened on 11 May 2024.
