= Cross Inn =

Hamlet in Carmarthenshire, Wales

Coordinates: 51.78°N 4.47°W

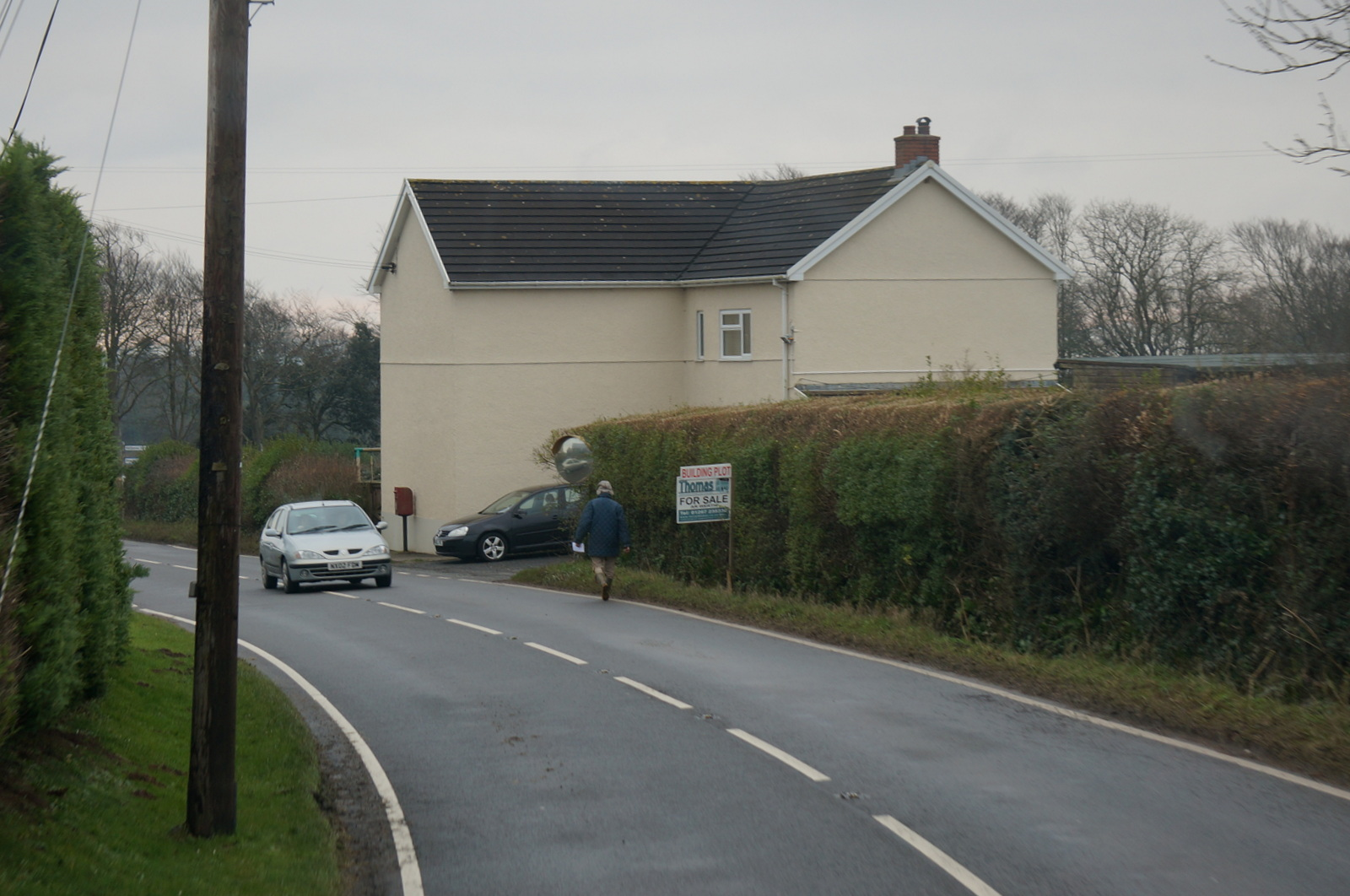

- Location within Carmarthenshire
- OS grid reference: SN295125
- Community: Laugharne Township
- Principal area: Carmarthenshire
- Country: Wales
- Sovereign state: United Kingdom
- Police: Dyfed-Powys
- Fire: Mid and West Wales
- Ambulance: Welsh

Cross Inn is a village in Carmarthenshire on the A4066 between St Clears and Laugharne. It is situated in the north of Laugharne Township community, the OS grid reference is SN2912.

The village initially developed around rural crossroads. In the 1851 Census, the village was anchored by a single public house ran by an innkeeper named John Davies. By 1871, the central inn became known as Penrhiwgaled Arms.
