= Bettws Newydd =

Village in Monmouthshire, Wales

Coordinates: 51.74993°N 2.92704°W

Bettws Newydd: Welsh: Betws Newydd
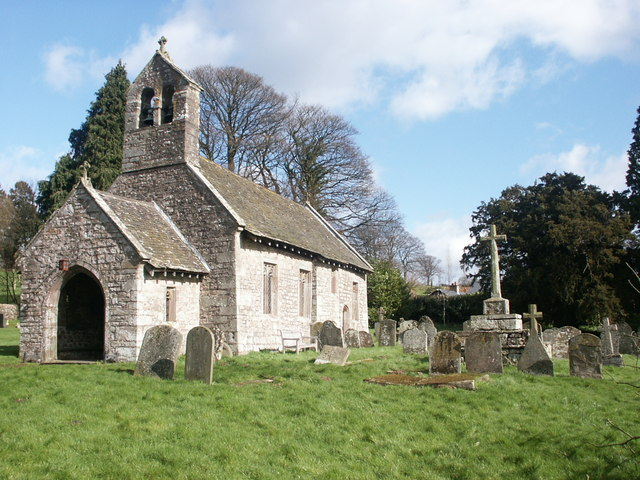
- St Aeddan's church

- Location within Monmouthshire
- OS grid reference: SO361061
- Principal area: Monmouthshire
- Preserved county: Gwent
- Country: Wales
- Sovereign state: United Kingdom
- Post town: USK
- Postcode district: NP15
- Dialling code: 01291
- Police: Gwent
- Fire: South Wales
- Ambulance: Welsh
- UK Parliament: Monmouth

Bettws Newydd (Welsh: Betws Newydd) is a small village in Monmouthshire, in southeast Wales located about 3 1/2 miles (5.6 km) north of Usk, a few miles south of Clytha near Raglan, Monmouthshire.

== Etymology ==
The first part of the name of the village comes from the Middle English word bedhus, meaning "prayer house", which became betws in Welsh. Bettws Newydd translates therefore to the new prayer house.

== History ==
The site was originally an oratory or place of prayer and was founded by Saint Aedan of Ferns, who founded several churches in Wales and was also known as St Aidan of Llawhaden. As it was largely reconstructed in the 15th century as a new oratory it was referred to as Bettws Newydd.

An old early Norman motte and bailey tump sits behind trees in the village next to the public house. St Aeddan's is 15th century and a Grade I listed building. It has a rare late medieval rood screen and rood loft carved from oak. In the churchyard are two yew trees estimated to be 1,000 years old. The trees are amongst the oldest yews in Wales.

On the surrounding hills are many tumuli or prehistoric burial mounds and at Coed-y-bwnydd meaning "the wood of the gentry" in Welsh (pronounced locally as 'Coed Bonnet'), is a large Iron Age hillfort with a massive mound protecting the entrance at the east and multi-vallate earthworks and entrenchments at that side, the other side being defended by a very steep incline. The wood and hillfort are in the care of the National Trust.

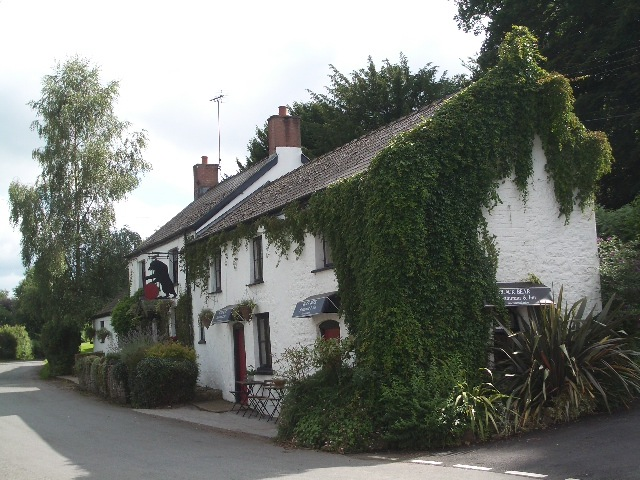
Black Bear pub

== Amenities ==
The village has a selection of property and a public house and restaurant with accommodation. A golf course is sited behind the pub.
