= Gwent County History =

Welsh history project

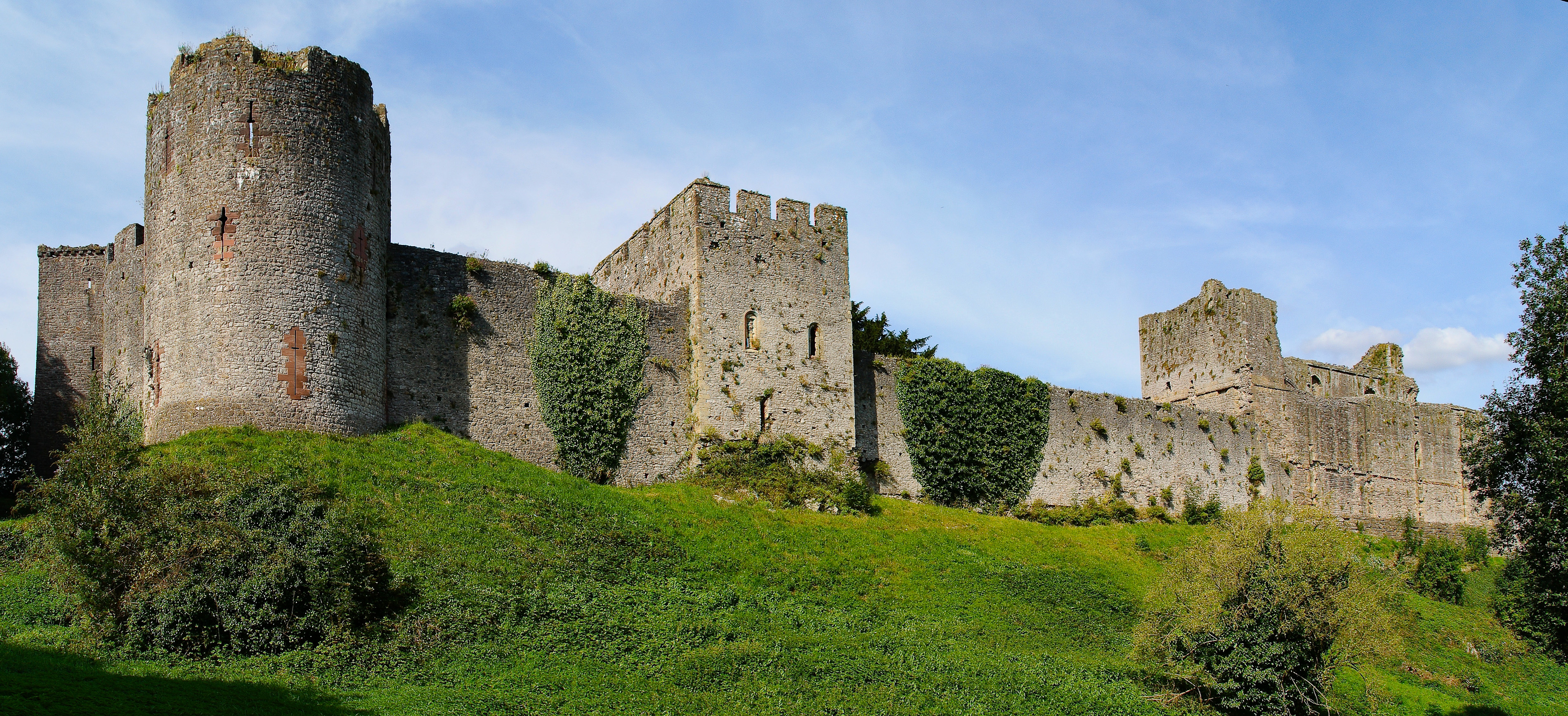
- Chepstow Castle - "the glory of medieval south Wales"
- Country: Wales
- Language: English
- Discipline: History
- Publisher: University of Wales Press
- Media type: Print
- No. of books: 5

The Gwent County History was a Welsh history project which created an encyclopaedic study of the historic county of Monmouthshire, known as Gwent between 1974 and 1996. The series was published by the University of Wales Press in five volumes between 2004 and 2013. Modelled on the Victoria County History of the counties of England, the works covered the history of Monmouthshire from pre-historic times to the end of the 20th century.

== History ==
The development of tourism in the late 18th century saw the beginnings of a historiography of Monmouthshire, with the writing of a number of histories of the area that frequently combined the features of a guidebook with a more formal historical approach. Among the first was William Gilpin's Observations on the River Wye and several parts of South Wales, etc. relative chiefly to Picturesque Beauty; made in the summer of the year 1770, published in 1782. Among the most notable was William Coxe's two-volume An Historical Tour in Monmouthshire, published in 1801. Coxe's preface explains the Tour's genesis: "The present work owes its origin to an accidental excursion in Monmouthshire, in company with my friend Sir Richard Hoare, during the autumn of 1798." A detailed county history was undertaken by Sir Joseph Bradney, in his A History of Monmouthshire from the Coming of the Normans into Wales down to the Present Time, published over a period of 30 years in the early 20th century.

The 20th century saw the publication of two lesser histories: Hugo Tyerman and Sydney Warner's Monmouthshire volume of Arthur Mee's The King's England series in 1951; and Arthur Clark's two-volume The Story of Monmouthshire, published in 1979–1980. The history of the county was covered in more anecdotal form by the Monmouthshire writer and artist Fred Hando, who chronicled the highways and byways of the county in some 800 newspaper articles written between the 1920s and the 1960s and published in the South Wales Argus, focusing on "the little places of a shy county".

Studies of the architecture of the county include John Newman's, Gwent/Monmouthshire volume of the Pevsner Buildings of Wales series; and, most exhaustively, Sir Cyril Fox and Lord Raglan's, three-volume study, Monmouthshire Houses. This was described by the architectural historian Peter Smith, author of the magisterial Houses of the Welsh Countryside, as "one of the most remarkable studies of vernacular architecture yet made in the British Isles, a landmark, in its own field, as significant as Darwin's Origin of Species".

In the 21st century a group of Welsh academics determined on the production of a county history. The series, modelled on the Victoria County History, had Ralph A. Griffiths as editor-in-chief, and was published by the University of Wales Press between 2004 and 2013. It covered the history of the county from prehistoric times to the 21st century.

== Structure and content ==
Although drawing inspiration from the Victoria County History, and unlike earlier work's such as Mee's The King's England, the Gwent County History does not follow a geographical approach. Instead, each volume comprises a series of essays, on a wide range of topics, historical, social, cultural, industrial, architectural, etc., written by a large number of contributing editors. Coherence was provided by the volume editors, under the overall direction of Ralph A. Griffiths, the editor-in-chief.

== Volumes ==
- Gwent in prehistory and early history, volume 1, editors Miranda J. Aldhouse-Green and Raymond Howell, 2004
- The age of the Marcher Lords: c.1070-1536, volume 2, editors Tony Hopkins and Raymond Howell, 2008
- The making of Monmouthshire: 1536-1780, volume 3, editors Madelaine Grey and Prys Morgan, 2009
- Industrial Monmouthshire:1780-1914, volume 4, editors Chris Williams and Sian Rhiannon Williams, 2011
- The Twentieth Century, volume 5, editors Chris Williams and Andy Croll, 2013

== Notable contributors ==
- Miranda Aldhouse-Green
- Ralph A. Griffiths
- Raymond Howell
- Julian Mitchell
- Prys Morgan
- John Newman
- Chris Williams

== See also ==
- Victoria County History
- A History of Monmouthshire from the Coming of the Normans into Wales down to the Present Time
- Monmouthshire Houses

== Sources ==
- Bradney, Joseph (1991). A History of Monmouthshire: The Hundred of Skenfrith, Volume 1 Part 1. London: Academy Books. ISBN 978-1-87336-1092. OCLC 669714197.
- — (1980). The Story of Monmouthshire, Volume 1, From the earliest times to the Civil War. Monmouth: Monnow Press. ISBN 978-0-95066-1810. OCLC 866777550.
- — (1979). The Story of Monmouthshire, Volume 2, From the Civil War to Present Times. Monmouth: Monnow Press. ISBN 978-0-95066-1803. OCLC 503676874.
- Coxe, William (1995) [1801]. An Historical Tour of Monmouthshire: Volume 1. Cardiff: Merton Priory Press. ISBN 978-1-8989-3709-8. OCLC 34476778.
- — (1995) [1801]. An Historical Tour of Monmouthshire: Volume 2. Cardiff: Merton Priory Press. ISBN 978-1-8989-3708-1. OCLC 34476778.
- Davies, R. R. (1992) [1987]. The Age of Conquest: Wales, 1063–1415. St. Martin's Press. ISBN 0-19-820198-2.
- Fox, Cyril; Raglan, Lord (1994). Medieval Houses. Monmouthshire Houses. Vol. 1. Cardiff: Merton Priory Press Ltd & The National Museum of Wales. ISBN 978-0-72000-3963. OCLC 916186124.
- Gilpin, William (1782). Observations on the river Wye, and several parts of South Wales, &c. relative chiefly to picturesque beauty, made in the summer of the year 1770. London. OCLC 5338693.
- Green, Miranda (2004). Prehistory and Early History. Gwent County History. Vol. 1. Cardiff: University of Wales Press. ISBN 978-0-7083-1826-3.
- Griffiths, Ralph A.; Williams, Chris; Croll, Andy (2013). Chris Williams (ed.). The Twentieth century. Gwent County History. Vol. 5. Cardiff: University of Wales Press. ISBN 9780708326480.
- Hando, Fred (1944). The Pleasant Land of Gwent. Newport: R. H. Johns Ltd. OCLC 2534151.
- — (1951). Journeys in Gwent. Newport: R. H. Johns Ltd. OCLC 30202753.
- — (1954). Monmouthshire Sketch Book. Newport: R. H. Johns Ltd. OCLC 30166792.
- — (1958). Out and About in Monmouthshire. Newport: R. H. Johns Ltd. OCLC 30235598.
- Howell, Raymond (1988). A History of Gwent. Llandysul: Gomer Press. ISBN 0863833381.
- Jenkins, Simon (2008). Wales: Churches, Houses, Castles. London: Penguin Books. ISBN 978-0-71399-8931.
- McCloy, Robert (2013). "Local government". In Williams, Chris; Croll, Andy; Griffiths, Ralph A. (eds.). The Twentieth Century. The Gwent County History. Vol. 5. Cardiff: University of Wales Press. ISBN 978-0-7083-2648-0. OCLC 855346482.
- Newman, John (2000). Gwent/Monmouthshire. The Buildings of Wales. London: Penguin Books. ISBN 978-0-30009-6309.
- Smith, Peter (1975). Houses of the Welsh Countryside. London: Her Majesty's Stationery Office. ISBN 978-0-1170-04757. OCLC 868639211.
- Tyerman, Hugo; Warner, Sydney (1951). Arthur Mee (ed.). Monmouthshire. The King's England. London: Hodder & Stoughton. OCLC 764861.
