= Merthyr Tydfil in 1851 =

Architectural study

Merthyr Tydfil in 1851: A Study of the Spatial Structure of a Welsh Industrial Town
- Author: Harold Carter and Sandra Wheatley
- Language: English
- Genre: Academic Study
- Published: 1982
- Publication place: United Kingdom

Merthyr Tydfil in 1851 is a volume of the architectural study by Harold Carter and Sandra Wheatley: A Study of the Spatial Structure of a Welsh Industrial Town published by the University of Wales Press in 1982. In 2014 the volume was out of print. Merthyr Tudfil is the Welsh language name of Merthyr Tydfil.It is the seventh book in the Social Science Monographs series, a study of industrial architecture in Wales.
