= Church of St Aeddan, Bettws Newydd =

Coordinates: 51.7479°N 2.9253°W

Church of St Aeddan
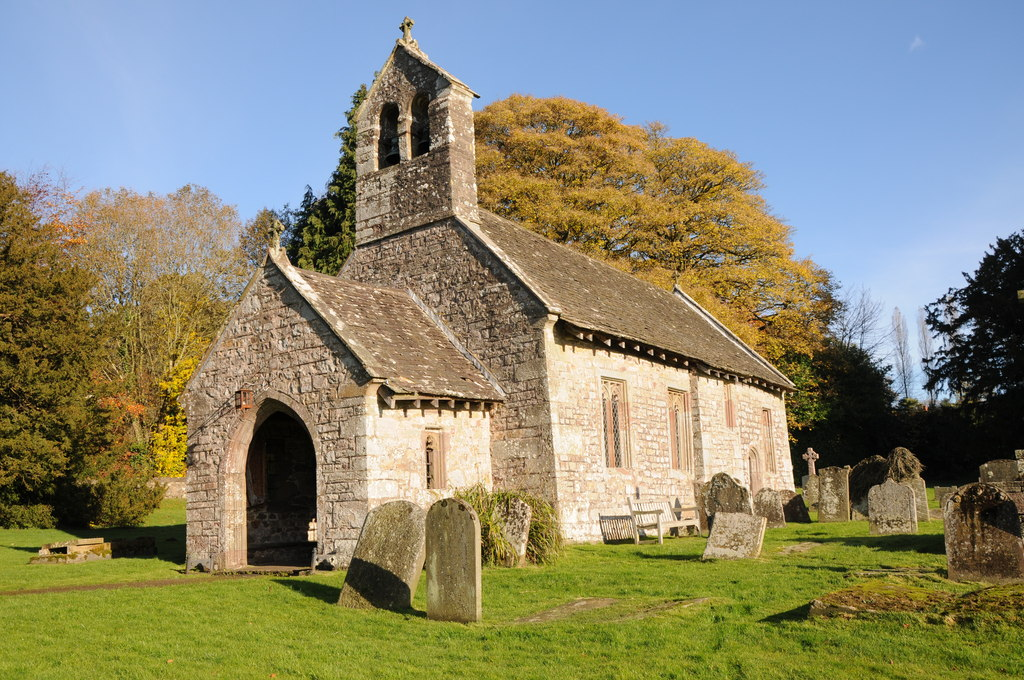

- Location in Monmouthshire
- Location: Bettws Newydd, Monmouthshire
- Country: Wales
- Denomination: Church in Wales

History
- Status: Parish church
- Founded: C15th century

Architecture
- Functional status: Active
- Heritage designation: Grade I
- Designated: 9 January 1956
- Architectural type: Church

Administration
- Diocese: Monmouth
- Archdeaconry: Monmouth
- Deanery: Raglan/Usk
- Parish: Heart of Monmouthshire Ministry Area

Clergy
- Rector: The Reverend Canon Sally Ingle-Gillis

The Church of St Aeddan, Bettws Newydd, Monmouthshire, Wales, is a fifteenth-century church of twelfth-century origin. It contains a notable rood screen. The church is a Grade I listed building and remains an active parish church in the Heart of Monmouthshire Ministry Area.

== History and architecture ==
The church dates from the twelfth century but the current building is medieval. It was restored in 1872. In 2020 the church was forced into temporary closure after Storm Dennis caused serious damage to the roof and water ingress into the interior. A grant provided jointly by the National Churches Trust and the Wolfson Foundation enabled repairs to the roof and the church reopened in 2024.

The interior contains "perhaps the most complete rood arrangement remaining in any church in England and Wales". The rood screen, loft and tympanum are all in situ. The Royal Commission on the Ancient and Historical Monuments of Wales considers that the screen is "most remarkable" and "probably unique in the British Isles". The church is a Grade I listed building.

St Aeddan's remains an active parish church in the Heart of Monmouthshire Ministry. The churchyard contains three historic yew trees.

== Gallery ==
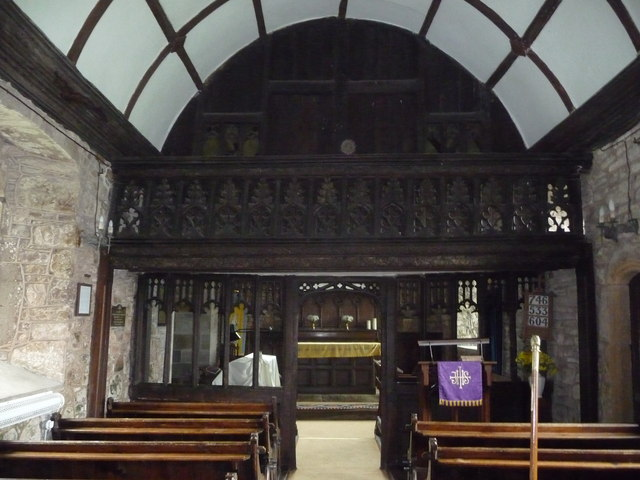
The interior

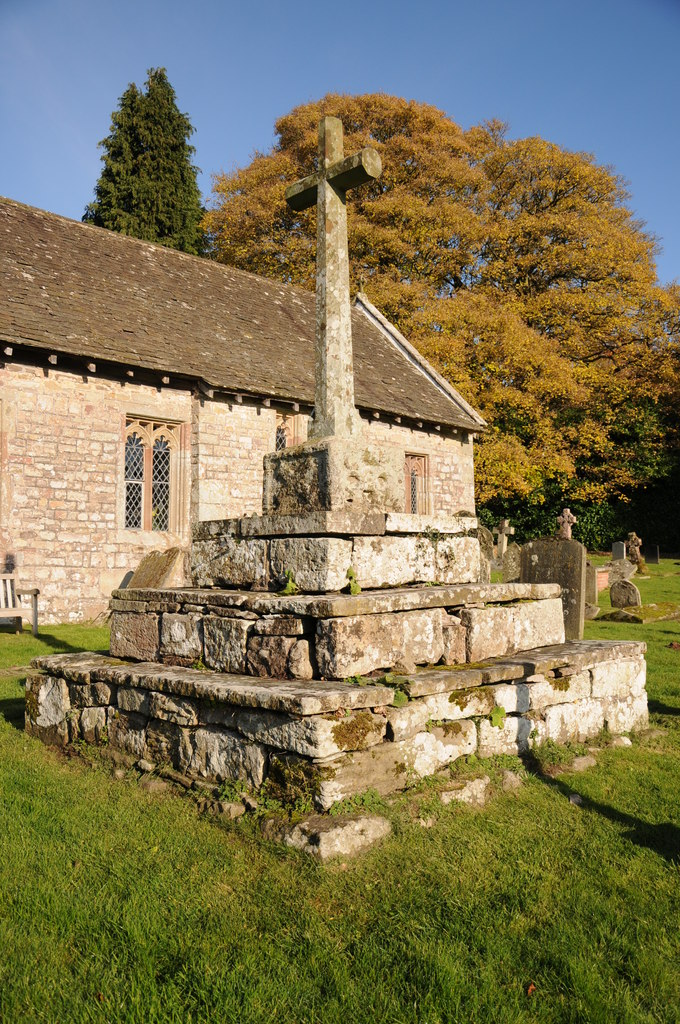
The churchyard cross
