= Ralph A. Griffiths =

Ralph Alan Griffiths is a historian and an emeritus professor at Swansea University.

== Life ==
Griffiths was born and brought up in a mining valley between Glamorgan and Monmouthshire. He attended "one of Wales' good grammar schools and was well taught in most subjects". He is a graduate of the University of Bristol and was appointed to a research post, and then promoted to higher academic positions, at Swansea in 1964.

Griffiths was a member, and later chair, of the Royal Commission on the Ancient and Historical Monuments of Wales, sat on the Advisory Council on Public Records, and on the Council of the Royal Historical Society. In 2001 he delivered the British Academy's Sir John Rhŷs Memorial Lecture. In 2004, Griffiths was appointed general editor of the Gwent County History, published in five volumes between 2004 and 2013. In 2011, he was elected a Fellow of the Learned Society of Wales. In 2021, he was awarded the Derek Allen Prize for Celtic studies by the British Academy.

== Works ==
- Sir Rhys ap Thomas and his Family: A Study in the Wars of the Roses and Early Tudor Politics, 2nd edn, with a new introduction, University of Wales Press, 2014. ISBN 9781783160143
- (ed. with Peter Wakelin), Hidden Histories: Discovering the Heritage of Wales (Aberystwyth: Royal Commission on the Ancient and Historical Monuments of Wales, 2008)
- (with Roger S. Thomas) The making of the Tudor dynasty, 3rd edn. (Stroud: Sutton, 2005)
- (ed.), The Household Book (1510–51) of Sir Edward Don: An Anglo-Welsh Knight and his Circle (Bedford: Buckinghamshire Record Society, 2004)
- The Short Oxford History of the British Isles: The Fourteenth and Fifteenth Centuries (Oxford: Oxford University Press, 2003)

== Sources ==
- Griffiths, Ralph A. (2004). Howell, Ray; Aldhouse-Green, Miranda (eds.). Gwent in Prehistory and Early History. The Gwent County History. Vol. 1. Cardiff: University of Wales Press. ISBN 978-0-7083-1826-3. OCLC 254031324.
