= The King's England =

Historical book series

Enchanted Land, the introductory volume in the series.

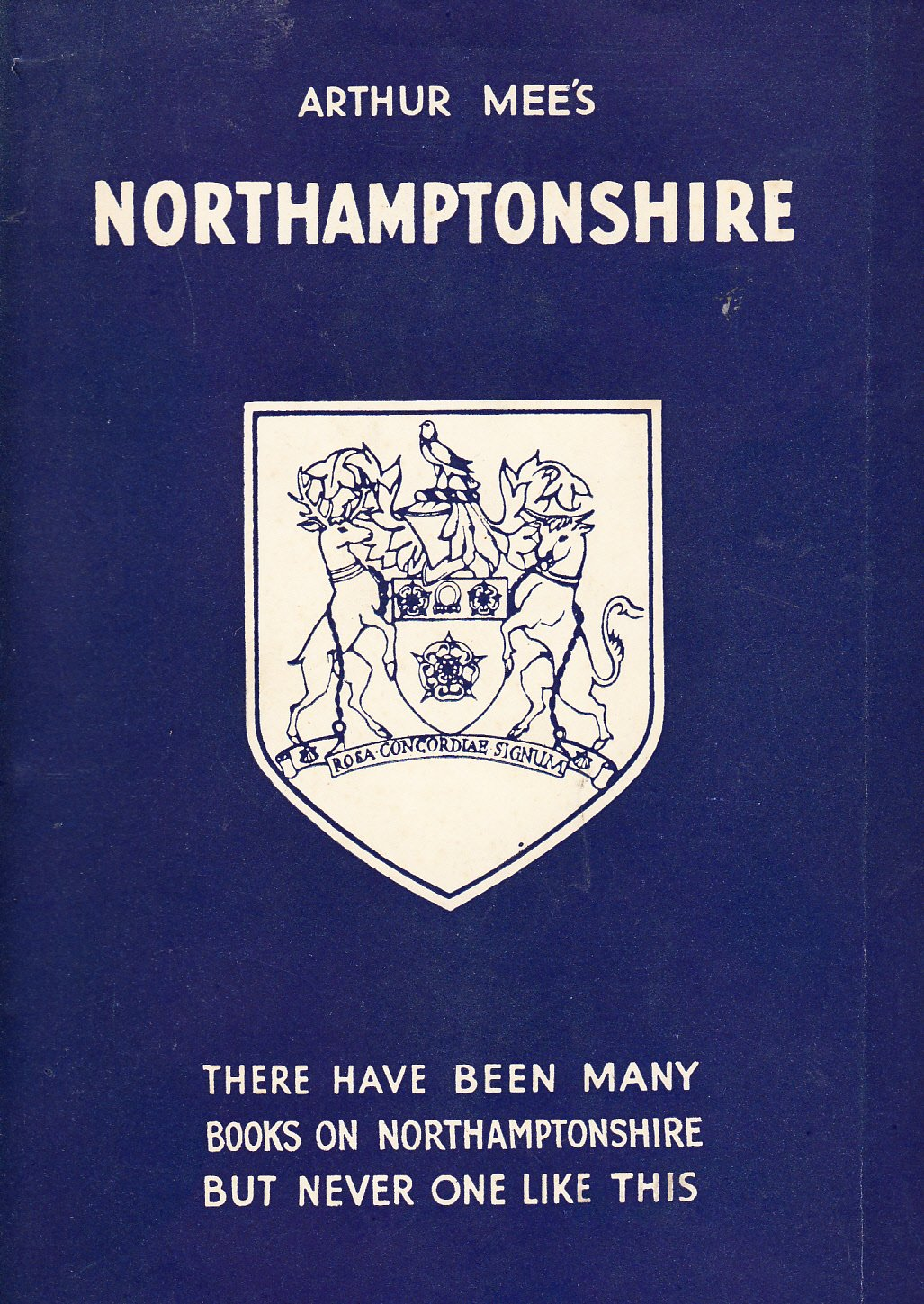
The Northamptonshire volume in the original cover style

The King's England is a topographical and historical book series written and edited by Arthur Mee in 43 volumes. The first, introductory, volume was published in 1936 by Hodder & Stoughton; in 1989, The King's England Press was established to reprint the series.

The publishers (Hodder and Stoughton) claimed that the series was a modern Domesday Book and that the compilers had travelled half-a-million miles in order to complete their task. The vast majority of the content is an alphabetical description of parish churches, and associated historical figures and other local worthies.

== Original titles ==
The first title in the series was the introductory volume, Enchanted Land: Half-a-million miles in the King's England, published by Hodder and Stoughton in 1936.

- Bedfordshire and Huntingdonshire
- Berkshire
- Buckinghamshire
- Cambridgeshire
- Cheshire
- Cornwall
- Derbyshire
- Devon
- Dorset
- Durham
- Enchanted Land: Half-a-million miles in the King's England
- Essex
- Gloucestershire (1938)
- Hampshire with the Isle of Wight
- Herefordshire
- Hertfordshire: London's Country Neighbour
- Kent
- Lake Counties
- Lancashire
- Leicestershire and Rutland
- Lincolnshire
- London: Heart of the Empire and Wonder of the World (1937)
- Middlesex (1940)
- Monmouthshire
- Norfolk
- Northamptonshire
- Northumberland
- Nottinghamshire
- Oxfordshire
- Shropshire
- Somerset
- Staffordshire
- Suffolk
- Surrey
- Sussex
- Warwickshire
- Wiltshire
- Worcestershire
- Yorkshire – East Riding
- Yorkshire – North Riding
- Yorkshire – West Riding

== Revised titles ==
In 1970, the London volume was split into three. Bomb damage during the Second World War, the subsequent post-war reconstruction and alterations to local government boundaries in 1965 all made it difficult to treat London properly in one volume. The new volumes, which brought the total to 43, were:

- London North of the Thames except the City and Westminster (1972)
- London – The City and Westminster
- London South of the Thames

== Reprints ==
In 1989, The King's England Press was established to reprint the series, "recognising the need for them, both as excellent guidebooks and now with the added dimension as historical documents in their own right."
