= University of Wales Press =

Welsh academic publisher

- Logo
- Parent company: University of Wales Trinity Saint David
- Founded: 1922
- Country of origin: Wales
- Headquarters location: Cardiff, Wales
- Distribution: Welsh Books Council (Wales); NBN International (UK, Europe, and Asia); Turpin Distribution (journals); Chicago Distribution Center (Americas, Australasia)
- Publication types: Books, Journals
- Official website: www.uwp.co.uk

The University of Wales Press (Welsh: Gwasg Prifysgol Cymru) was founded in 1922 as a central service of the University of Wales. The press publishes academic journals and around seventy books a year in the English and Welsh languages on six general subjects: history, political philosophy and religious studies, Welsh and Celtic studies, literary studies, European studies and medieval studies. The press has a backlist of over 3,500 titles.

The main offices of the University of Wales Press are in Cardiff.

With the announcement in 2011 that the University of Wales would be functionally merged into Trinity Saint David, it was envisaged that the University of Wales Press would also be merged into the institution.

In September 2016 it was announced the Press would be forming a partnership with the Open Library of Humanities to convert the International Journal of Welsh Writing in English into a full open-access journal.

== Book series ==
In 2024 the following book series were being published:

=== Series in English ===
- Architecture in Wales
- Arthurian Literature in the Middle Ages
- French and Francophone Studies
- Gender Studies in Wales
- Gothic Authors: Critical Revisions
- Gothic Literary Studies
- Horror Studies
- Iberian and Latin American Studies
- International Crime Fictions
- International Law
- Intersections in Literature and Science
- Literary Geography: Theory and Practice
- Lives and Beliefs of the Ancient Egyptians
- Materialities in Anthropology and Archaeology
- Medieval Animals
- New Approaches to Celtic Religion and Mythology
- New Century Chaucer
- New Dimensions in Science Fiction
- Political Philosophy Now
- The Public Law of Wales
- Race, Ethnicity, Wales and the World
- Religion and Culture in the Middle Ages
- Rethinking the History of Wales
- Scientists of Wales
- Studies in Visual Culture
- Studies in Welsh History
- Wales and the French Revolution
- Writers of Wales
- Writing Wales in English

=== Series in Welsh ===
- Dawn Dweud ("Gift of Speech" (?); a series of literary biographies)
- Y Meddwl a'r Dychymyg Cymreig ("Welsh Thought and Imagination")
- Safbwyntiau: Gwleidyddiaeth · Diwylliant · Cymdeithas ("Standpoints: Politics, Culture, Society")

== See also ==
- Merthyr Tydfil in 1851
