= Friends of Friendless Churches =

English and Welsh charity formed in 1957

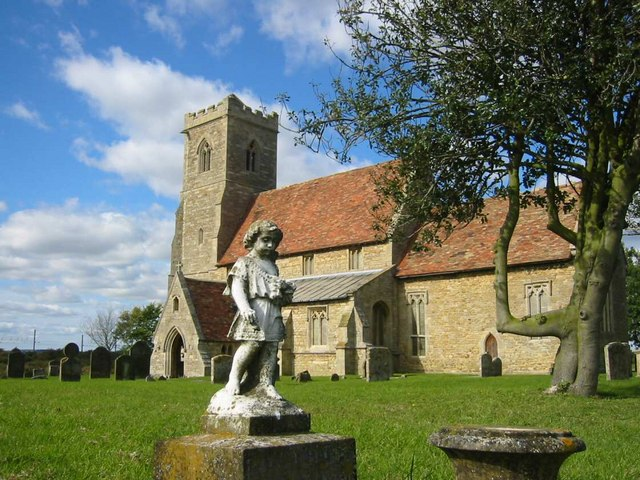
St Andrew's Church, Woodwalton

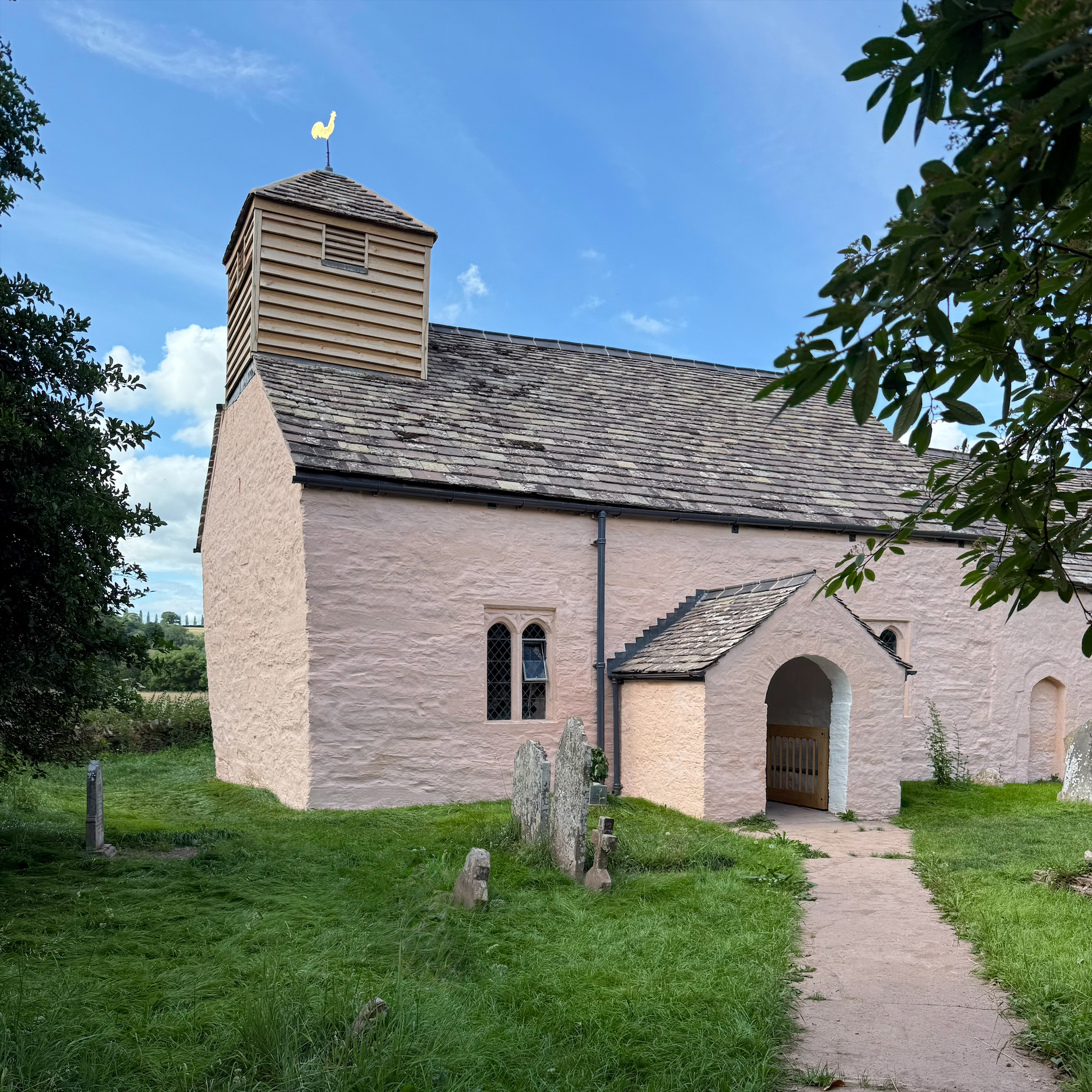
St James's Church, Llangua

Friends of Friendless Churches (FoFC), also referred to as 'The Friends', is a registered charity formed in 1957, active in England and Wales, which campaigns for and rescues redundant historic places of worship threatened by demolition, decay, or inappropriate conversion. As of April 2026, the charity cares for over 70 redundant churches, chapels, and meeting houses in England and Wales.

== History ==
The charity was formed in 1957 by Ivor Bulmer-Thomas, a writer, former MP and a high church Anglican. He was the charity's honorary director until his death in 1993. The first executive committee included prominent politicians, artists, poets and architects, among them John Betjeman, John Piper, Roy Jenkins, T. S. Eliot, Harry Goodhart-Rendel and Rosalie Lady Mander. Initially the charity campaigned and obtained grants for the repair and restoration of churches within its remit. The 1968 Pastoral Measure established the Redundant Churches Fund (now called Churches Conservation Trust). However, the Church Commissioners turned down a number of buildings that the executive committee considered worthy of preservation, including Old St Matthew's Church, Lightcliffe, and St Peter's Church, Wickham Bishops. The charity therefore decided in 1972 to change its constitution, allowing it to acquire threatened buildings either by freehold or by lease. The tower of the church at Lightcliffe was the first property to be vested with the charity.

Bulmer-Thomas' first restoration project was St James's Church in Llangua, Monmouthshire. He led the project in 1954–55, with the repairs carried out by E A Roiser. Bulmer-Thomas restored the church as a memorial for his late wife, Dilys Thomas, with a plaque dedicated to her placed at the church's entrance. After the restoration was complete he founded the FoFC in 1957 to "secure the preservation of churches and chapels, or of any part thereof, in the United Kingdom, whether belonging to or formerly used by the Church of England or by any other religious body … for public access and the benefit of the nation", marking St James's as a pivotal building in the history of church conservation and repair in England and Wales. Continuing his legacy, the FoFC completed a substantial restoration of St James's Church in 2024–25, which included extensive repair of the wagon roofs, lime plastering, rendering and limewashing. The church re-opened to the visitors in June 2025 and is open daily.

In 2025, the FoFC acquired four historically significant sites from the Historic Chapels Trust, ensuring their long-term conservation and public access. The acquisitions were Farfield Friends Meeting House (West Yorkshire), Coanwood Friends Meeting House (Northumberland), Cote Baptist Chapel (Oxfordshire), and Biddlestone Roman Catholic Chapel (Northumberland). This follows a strategic move by the Historic Chapels Trust to find sustainable new custodians for its portfolio of buildings ahead of the charity closing its operations. The chapels form part of the biggest single-year acquisition programme in the FoFC's 68-year history.

== Operations ==
The charity raises money from various sources. Since 1999, it has worked in partnership with Cadw and the Church in Wales to take redundant churches in Wales into its care. In Wales, the charity receives funding for taking Anglican churches into its care. Of this, 70% comes from the Welsh Government through Cadw, and 30% from the Church in Wales.

In England, the charity does not receive regular public funding, but has obtained grants from bodies such as English Heritage. In 2024–25, conservation projects at St James's Church, Llangua in Monmouthshire and St Lawrence's Church, Gumfreston in Pembrokeshire were supported by the National Heritage Memorial Fund and the Garfield Weston Foundation. Other income comes from donations, membership fees and legacies from members of the public. Some churches have been supported by the formation of local groups of Friends. The charity administers two trusts, one of which, the Cottam Will Trust, was established by Rev S. E. Cottam for "the advancement of religion of objects of beauty to be placed in ancient Gothic churches either in England or Wales".

All the churches owned by the charity are listed buildings, and most are former Anglican churches, either from the Church of England or the Church in Wales, although there are also private chapels, Nonconformist sites and a Roman Catholic church.

On the charity's 50th anniversary in 2007 it published a book titled Saving Churches, containing details of their history and accounts of their churches. The charity describes itself as an architectural conservation organisation which aims to preserve beautiful places of worship as public monuments. The charity told The Guardian newspaper in 2019 that cared-for and cherished should not mean fossilised, and instead they want to offer their places of worship for public events such as concerts, knitting groups, seasonal lectures, art exhibitions, supper clubs and the occasional religious ceremony. "They intend to carry on working tirelessly to preserve what Shakespeare described as our magnificent 'sermons in stone' for generations to come", The Guardian stated.

The Friends argued against Church of England plans, published in 2021, that aimed to diminish the democracy of the church closure process, and reduce the transparency and accountability of the Church.

== People ==
The charity's patronage fell vacant following the death of the Marquess of Anglesey in 2013. The ecclesiastical patron is Rev Wyn Evans, former Bishop of St Davids, and the president is the Marquess of Salisbury.

Rachel Morley has been the director of the charity since 2018, and as of January 2025 there were five members of staff.

== List of vested churches ==
The list is in two sections, one for England and the other for Wales. This division reflects the former management of most of the English churches by the Church of England and of the Welsh churches by the Church in Wales, and the different funding arrangements in the two countries.

Key

Grade	Criteria
I	Buildings of exceptional interest, sometimes considered to be internationally important
II*	Particularly important buildings of more than special interest
II	Buildings of national importance and special interest

=== England ===
Name	Location	Image	Date^{[A]}	Notes	Grade
St Peter	Wickham Bishops, Essex; 51.7698°N 0.6434°E	A honey-coloured stone church with a red tiled roof seen from the southwest. On the west end is a window above a door, on the corner is a buttress, a porch in on the south side, and on the roof is a small wooden belfry	11th century	It is thought this was originally a private chapel for the Bishops of London, and then became a parish church. It was restored in 1850, but then became a chapel of ease in the parish of St Bartholomew. The fabric deteriorated and it was declared redundant in 1975. Since 1995 it has been used as an artist's studio.	II*
St Peter	Llancillo, Herefordshire; 51.9250°N 2.9231°W		11th to 12th century	In a remote position near the England–Wales border, it is thought the site was used by a hermit in the 6th century. The church was restored in the 17th century, but it closed for public worship in 2006.	II*
Urishay Castle Chapel	Urishay, Peterchurch, Herefordshire; 52.0328°N 2.9883°W	On a bank, tucked behind trees is a simple chapel, to the left of which are castle ruins	Early 12th century	The chapel is built in the bailey of the now-ruined Urishay Castle. A chancel was added in the 13th century, alterations were made in the 16th and 17th centuries, and restorations have been carried out during the 20th century. It has been under the care of the charity since 1978.	II*
St John	Allington, Wiltshire; 51.1534°N 1.7095°W	A short flint church with a red tiled roof, and a battlemented south tower with a pyramidal roof	12th century	Although it originated in the 12th century, only the chancel arch and part of a Norman arch remain from that period. The rest was built in 1847–51, and was designed by the "priest-architect" Fr William Grey.	II
St Mary	Temple, Corsley, Wiltshire; 51.2021°N 2.2516°W	Part of a church built in stone with red tiles and a short spire	1902–3	Private chapel built by the Barton Trust in Arts and Crafts Gothic, funded by Mary Barton in memory of her husband and son.	II
All Saints	Ballidon, Derbyshire; 53.0867°N 1.6970°W	A simple stone church with a bellcote, seen from the southeast	12th century	Originating in the 12th century, the church was much rebuilt and restored in the 19th century.	II
St Mary Magdalene	Boveney, Buckinghamshire; 51.4903°N 0.6474°W	A flint church seen from the southeast, with a red tiled roof and, at the far end, a weatherboarded tower	12th century	The church stands on the north bank of the River Thames, and was built for bargemen working on the river. It was declared redundant in 1975 and came under the care of the charity in 1983. It was later found that the tower was unstable, and repairs costing £200,000 have been carried out, partially funded by choral concerts held at nearby Eton College.	I
St Leonard	Spernall, Warwickshire; 52.2572°N 1.8748°W	A stone church seen from the south east with steep tiled roofs. Nearest is the chancel with a round east window, beyond that is a larger, higher nave, at the end of which is a bellcote	12th century	Alterations were made to the church in the 14th and 18th centuries. In the mid-19th century a chancel, porch and bellcote were added. It was declared redundant in 1972. After an application for conversion to a house was declined, it was bought by the Ancient Monuments Society to save it from demolition. A series of repairs has been carried out, and since 1983 it has been used as an artist's workshop.	II*
St John the Baptist	Sutterby, Lincolnshire; 53.2306°N 0.0746°E	Seen from a distance, in a graveyard, is a simple stone church, the chancel smaller and lower than the nave; protruding from the wall are a buttress and a porch	12th century	Additions were made to the church in the 14th century and a porch was built in 1743. It was made redundant in 1972. It was donated as a monument in 1981. Major repairs were carried out in 2002, and more are being undertaken in 2010.	II
St Mary	Hardmead, Buckinghamshire; 52.1196°N 0.6358°W	Seen between trees is part of the church; visible are a tower and nave with clerestory, both battlemented, and a porch	13th century	The church was built to serve a medieval village that has since disappeared. Additions were made to it in the 15th century. After it was declared redundant, it was proposed to convert it into a house, but it was acquired by the charity and, as of 2010, is managed by the Friends of Hardmead.	I
Ruins of St Andrew's Church	South Huish, South Hams, Devon; 50.2555°N 3.8318°W	The ruins of a church seen from the southeast. Still standing are the tower, the south wall, with three windows, and the east end; there are no roofs	13th century	Additions were made to the church in the 14th and 15th centuries, but its fabric deteriorated and by 1866 it was considered to be beyond repair. A new church was built in a nearby village and all the fittings were removed. The charity has carried out work to slow down the rate of decay of the ruins, and services are held annually at the site.	II*
St Andrew	Woodwalton, Cambridgeshire; 52.4241°N 0.2237°W	A stone church with red tiled roofs seen from an angle, the battlemented tower being on the left. In the foreground is a statue of a child.	13th century	Additions and modifications have been made over the centuries since it was built. Because of its isolated position, it has suffered from theft and, since it was declared redundant, it has been subject to damage from vandalism. In addition the foundations are moving, leading to parts of the church settling at different rates. The church had been placed on the Heritage at Risk Register and applications have been made for grants towards its repair. Following repairs, it was removed from the register in 2022.	II*
St Mary	Fordham, Norfolk; 52.5706°N 0.3838°E	A simple stone church, consisting of a nave and a smaller chancel, seen from the south	13th century	The tower and south aisle were demolished in about 1730, leaving a simple church consisting of a nave and chancel, with a bellcote.	II*
St Denis	East Hatley, Cambridgeshire; 52.1380°N 0.1235°W	A simple stone church, consisting of a nave and chancel, viewed from the south-west	c.1300	A simple church without tower or spire. The nave dates from about 1300; the chancel was rebuilt by William Butterfield in 1871–74, with a reredos articulated in different-coloured stones.	II*
St Mary	Mundon, Essex; 51.6912°N 0.7182°E	The end of a church seen between trees; the ground floor is timber framed, above this is a weatherboarded tower, and to the left part of the stone body of the church. All the roofs are covered in red tiles	14th century	The church is constructed from a variety of materials; the nave is in stone, the chancel in brick, the aisle on three sides of the tower is timber-framed, the belfry is weatherboarded, and the roof is tiled. Some of the original 18th-century furniture is still present. Repair and conservation work, assisted by a grant of £140,000 from English Heritage, has been carried out.	I
St Mary Magdalene	Caldecote, Hertfordshire; 52.0305°N 0.1989°W	A stone church seen from the southwest, with a tower on the left; the porch and body of the church are battlemented	14th to 15th century	The church stands in a deserted medieval village that was abandoned mainly during the 15th and 16th centuries. It was repaired during the 18th century, but because of depopulation it was declared redundant in 1975. It has been under the care of the charity since 1982, and its survival is now assisted by the Caldecote Church Friends.	II*
Ayshford Chapel	Ayshford, Devon; 50.9285°N 3.3555°W	Seen beyond a river and a field is a simple stone chapel with three arched windows and a door; to the right is a two-storeyed stone house	15th century	This was the private chapel of the Ayshford family of the adjacent Ayshford Court, and it was renovated in the 19th century. The charity undertook major work in 2001–02 that included restoration of the internal salmon-pink limewash, and repair of the stained glass.	I
St Mary	Eastwell, Kent; 51.1900°N 0.8745°E	To the left is a battlemented tower, in the middle a ruined wall, and to the right the end of a stone chapel with a red tiled roof	15th century	Only the tower, the wall of the south aisle, and the 19th-century mortuary chapel remain. The monuments formerly in the church have been moved, most of them to the Victoria and Albert Museum. The remains are a scheduled monument.	II
St Mary	Long Crichel, Dorset; 50.8919°N 2.0334°W	A church seen from the southeast, with an apsidal chancel, a south transept, and a battlemented west tower	15th century	The Perpendicular tower dates from the 15th century. The rest of the church was rebuilt in 1851, although the interior is more Georgian than Gothic Revival in style.	II
Tower of St Peter's Church	Saltfleetby, Lincolnshire; 53.3868°N 0.1573°E	A tower with three stages; in the bottom stage is a door, in the middle stage is a large window with tracery, and in the top stage is a two-light louvred bell opening	Late 15th century	The tower is the only surviving part of the structure of this former church. It was taken into the care of the charity in 1976.	I
St John the Baptist	Papworth St Agnes, Cambridgeshire; 52.2639°N 0.1414°W	A stone church with a chequerboard appearance; on the left is a battlemented tower, the nave has three windows and the chancel, which is lower, has two windows	1530	The church was almost completely rebuilt in the 19th century, to a design thought to be by its rector, Rev J. H. Sperling. By the 1970s it was largely derelict, and it was taken into the care of the charity in 1979. The church has been restored with the addition of a kitchen and toilets, and it is used as a community centre.	II*
Tuxlith Chapel	Milland, West Sussex; 51.0478°N 0.8238°W	A simple chapel with a bellcote and a protruding porch, and winter trees behind	16th century	A gallery was added to the chapel in the 17th century, and during the following century the north transept was built. Because of population growth, a new larger church was built nearby in 1879, and the chapel was used as a Sunday school. This use continued until the 1930s, but the building's fabric subsequently deteriorated and it was declared redundant in 1974. The chapel has been restored and is now used as a community centre, hosting concerts and other events.	II
St Lawrence	Hutton Bonville, North Yorkshire; 54.3958°N 1.483°W	A small stone church with lancet windows and a bellcote	17th century	The church dates from 16th and 17th centuries, but was almost completely rebuilt in 1896. It served as the estate church for Hutton Bonville Hall, Yorkshire home of the Beresford-Peirse family. The hall was demolished in 1962, and the church now stands in complete isolation, disturbed only by the trains of the East Coast Main Line.	II
St Helen	Barmby on the Marsh, East Riding of Yorkshire; 53.7477°N 0.9549°W	A stone church with a prominent brick tower, capped with a cupola	17th century	The nave dates from 1600 (Historic England) or earlier (FoFC), the tower from the 18th century and the chancel from the 19th. The tower, with its copper cupola, dates from the 18th century restoration.	II
Thornton-le-Beans; Chapel	Thornton-le-Beans, North Yorkshire; 54.3075°N 1.3936°W	A simple stone chapel seen from the south with a west bellcote	1770	This has always been a chapel of ease in the parish of St Andrew, South Otterington. It is a stone chapel with a simple plan consisting of a nave and chancel, with a west bellcote.	II
Tower of Old St Matthew's Church	Lightcliffe, West Yorkshire; 53.7245°N 1.7896°W	A slender stone tower in a graveyard. On the left face are two windows, one round-headed, the other round; on the right face is a clock; and on the summit is a cupola surmounted by a ball finial	1775	The Neoclassical style church was replaced in the late 19th century by a new church a short distance away, and it was then used as a mortuary chapel. It was damaged in a storm in the 1960s, and then suffered from vandalism. The body of the church was demolished, and the tower was taken into the care of the charity, who organised its repair.	II
Strict and Particular Baptist Chapel	Waddesdon, Buckinghamshire; 51.8289°N 0.9085°W	A white-painted simple chapel with a brick chimney stack and a red tiled roof. On the front are two sash windows, and a similar window is on the side at a higher level.	1792	A porch and an extension were added in the 19th century. The chapel closed in 1976, and since then the charity has carried out repairs to the chapel and to its associated stables.	II
Chapel of St John the Baptist	Matlock Bath, Derbyshire; 53.1311°N 1.5616°W	Beyond a tall wall is the end of a chapel with a triple window in the gable, a shorted tower to the right with a pyramidal roof, and an oriel window protruding more to the right	1897	This was a private chapel for Mrs Louisa Sophia Harris, who commissioned Arts and Crafts artists to design the building and its fittings and furnishings. These included Guy Dawber, Louis Davis, George Bankart and John Cooke. Since taking it over, the charity has organised repairs and cleaning.	II*
St Mary of the Angels	Brownshill, Chalford, Gloucestershire; 53.1311°N 1.5616°W	A cotswold stone simple chapel with a small bell turret.	1930–37	The church was built to serve the religious community of Templewood, later a Tertiary Chapter of the Dominican Order. It is the first Roman Catholic church to be vested in the charity.	II
St Helen	Skeffling, East Riding of Yorkshire; 53.6534°N 0.07393°E	A rubble-stone church with a slate roof. On the west end is a castellated tower, with lower nave and chancel to the east. A red brick porch fronts the building	15th century	A parish church dating from the 15th century with 19th and 20th century restorations.	I
St Andrew	South Runcton, Norfolk; 52.6545°N 0.3920°E	A stone church with a semi-circular chancel and a small bell-cot	12th century	Originally built in the 12th century, the church was completely rebuilt in 1838–9. It is one of the earliest Victorian churches in the county.	II*
St Mary's	Kenderchurch, Kilpeck, Herefordshire; 51.9508°N 2.8702°E	A stone church with chancel and a small bell-cot	Early 19th century	Much of the church was rebuilt by William Chick of Hereford in 1870–72, but it retains many older features. It came into the care of the Friends of Friendless Churches in October 2023. The site is associated with the 6th-century Welsh saint Cynidr.	II
St Giles's	Tadlow, South Cambridgeshire	A stone church with chancel and a small bell-cot	Medieval 19th century	Medieval church with a nave and a chancel, dated to the 14th century and a 15th-century tower. Restored around 1860 under the supervision of William Butterfield, with glazing by Alexander Gibbs.	II*
	Roman Catholic Chapel Biddlestone, Northumberland	A stone church with chancel and a small bell-cot	19th century	Built on the foundations of the pele tower dating to the 14th century, the current Gothic Revival chapel was erected by the Selby family of (now) demolished Biddlestone Hall.	II*
	Farfield Quaker Meeting House, West Yorkshire:	A stone church with chancel and a small bell-cot	17th century	A small, simple, but deeply moving meeting house near Addingham, that was built immediately after the Act of Toleration of 1689.	II*
	Coanwood Meeting House, Northumberland	A stone church with chancel and a small bell-cot	18th century	Built close to Hadrian’s Wall in 1760, the interior of this Quaker’s meeting house is almost unaltered, making it a rare, eloquent survival of a historic layout.	II*
	Cote Baptist Chapel, Oxfordshire	A stone church with chancel and a small bell-cot	18th century	Founded in the early 1700s, the interior of this Baptist Chapel retains a full set of wood-grained box pews, a three-sided gallery, a pulpit with and a lead-lined full immersion baptismal tank.	II*

=== Wales ===
Name	Location	Photograph	Date^{[A]}	Notes	Grade
St Peulan	Llanbeulan, Anglesey; 53.2513°N 4.4409°W	A stone church with slate roofs seen from the southeast. To the right is the chancel, to the left is a large transept, beyond which can be seen a bellcote	12th century	Despite a 19th-century restoration, the church has retained its simple medieval character. It contains a font that possibly dates from the pre-Norman era.	II*
St James	Llangua, Grosmont, Monmouthshire	A stone church with slate roofs seen from the southeast. To the right is the chancel, to the left is a large transept, beyond which can be seen a bellcote	12th century	The structure at St James's in Llangua dates from the 12th century, as a small stone building with an oak roof. Around 1500, a new roof was added, in addition to the new chancel, windows, and a new doorway. A Victorian restoration project was undertaken in 1889 by Thomas Nicholson of Hereford. Ivor Bulmer-Thomas led its mid-20th century restoration as a dedication to his late wife, with the FoFC continuing his legacy and launching a large-scale restoration of the church in 2024-25.	II*
St Jerome	Llangwm Uchaf, Monmouthshire; 51.7009°N 2.8220°W	A stone church in a graveyard behind evergreen trees	12th century	The church has 12th century origins and was restored in 1863–1878. Its features include a formidable tower to the north side, an elaborately carved early 15th century screen, 19th century floor tiles and the 19th century east window.	I
St Cynhaearn, Ynyscynhaearn	Ystumllyn, near Criccieth, Gwynedd; 52.9262°N 4.1945°W	A simple church, seen end-on, with a bellcote and transepts; in the foreground are gravestones	12th century	The church stands in an isolated position on what used to be an island in a former lake, and is approached by an ancient causeway. Its structure dates from the 12th, 16th and 17th centuries, while most of the interior fittings are Georgian in style, dating from 1832.	II*
St Mary, Tal-y-llyn	Near Aberffraw, Anglesey; 53.2277°N 4.4484°W	A stone very simple church see from the west end. The only features are a small round-headed door, a small bellcote, and a tiny rectangular window	12th century (probable)	This is a simple medieval church that is virtually unrestored. Its fabric dates from the 12th century (probably) and the 16th and 17th centuries. Most of the furnishings are from the 18th century, although some have had to be replaced because of vandalism in the 20th century.	I
St Mary	Derwen, Denbighshire; 53.0455°N 3.3882°W	A small stone church with a slate roof see from the southwest. Scaffolding surrounds the west end and bellcote, and the porch	13th century	St Mary's Church retains late pre-Reformation stone carving, and a rood screen with its loft. Its fabric dates from the 13th century, and it was restored in 1857. The churchyard contains a pre-Reformation cross and a sundial, both of which are listed.	I
St Odoceus	Llandawke, Carmarthenshire; 51.7732°N 4.4904°W	A stone church with a slate roof seen from the southwest. Nearest is a relatively large tower with a pyramidal roof, beyond which is body of the church	13th century	Having been built in the 13th century, it was remodelled during the following century, and restored in the Victorian era. When it was taken over by the charity in 2006 it was in "a state of dereliction"; repair and restoration work has been carried out.	II
St Ellyw	Llanelieu, Powys; 52.0000°N 3.1887°W	A simple single-storey church seen from a distance with a bellcote and a porch; sheep graze in front of it	13th century	In an isolated position in the Brecon Beacons, it has retained much of its medieval interior, including wall paintings and a rood screen. It is used as a venue for the annual Talgarth Festival.	I
St Michael and All Angels	Llanfihangel Rogiet, Monmouthshire; 51.5850°N 2.7857°W	A stone church seen from the south, with a square battlemented tower at the left, then the nave, and a lower chancel at the right. In front of the church is the base of a medieval cross	13th century	The church stands close to a group of farm buildings. Following a programme of restoration work by the charity, it is managed by the Local History Society.	II*
St Brothen	Llanfrothen, Gwynedd; 52.9503°N 4.0521°W		13th century	The church was re-roofed in the 15th century, additions were made in the 17th century, and restorations took place in the 19th century. It retains its rood screen constructed from the wood of trees felled between 1496 and 1506.	I
St Michael and All Angels	Castlemartin, Pembrokeshire; 51.6498°N 5.0216°W	A single-storey church built in rubble masonry with a large, central, tower. Restored in the 19th century.	13th century (probable)	The church dates from the late 12th/early 13th centuries and was restored twice in the 19th century. It contains important Victorian stained glass by Heaton, Butler and Bayne and Hardman & Co., with one of the latter to a design by Augustus Pugin.	I
St Michael and All Angels	Gwernesney, Monmouthshire; 51.7119°N 2.8482°W	A red sandstone church with a small bellcote	13th century	A medieval church which was lightly restored in 1863–1864 by Prichard and Seddon. Two bells in the western bell turret are original, dating from the 13th century and among the oldest church bells in Monmouthshire.	I
Hodgeston Parish Church	Hodgeston, Pembrokeshire; 51.6585°N 4.8503°W	A simple church seen from the southeast with a tall slender tower on the left, then the nave and a chancel with a slightly higher roof line	13th century (probable)	At the beginning of the 19th century the church was "in extreme disrepair". It was renovated in the 1850s, but retained many of its internal features, including a Norman font, a double piscina, and a triple sedilia.	II*
St Decumanus	Rhoscrowther, Pembrokeshire; 51.6794°N 5.0332°W	A church with a tall church tower positioned centrally.	13th century (possibly)	Mainly medieval church with a tall tower, dedicated to St Decumanus (St Decuman). Has four side chapels associated with houses in the parish. Located beside a large oil refinery.	I
Manordeifi Old Church	Manordeifi, Pembrokeshire; 52.0584°N 4.5855°W	A stone church seen from an angle in a graveyard, with a porch and a bellcote	13th or 14th century	The church stands close to the River Teifi. Following repairs in the earlier part of the 19th century, it was abandoned as a parish church in 1899, and taken into the care of the charity in 2002. The tradition of keeping a coracle in the porch in case of flooding continues to be maintained.	II*
St Anno	Llananno, Powys; 52.3597°N 3.3294°W	A single-storey church built in rubble stone with a bellcote and a porch at the Western end	14th century	First recorded in 1304, the church was repaired in 1837 and completely rebuilt in 1877–1878 by David Walker of Liverpool. The interior contains a rood screen of 1500, restored in 1880 and again in 1960, and "one of the great treasures of Welsh craftsmanship".	II*
St Baglan	Llanfaglan, Gwynedd; 53.1210°N 4.3095°W	At the far end of a graveyard is a simple stone church, which appears L-shaped, and has a bellcote	14th century	St Baglan's stands in an isolated position in a field. It escaped restoration in the 19th century, and retains its 18th-century furnishings, including communion rails, pulpit with sounding board, box pews and benches.	I
St Beuno	Penmorfa, Gwynedd; 52.9402°N 4.1721°W	The north side of stone church with a slate roof, seen through a graveyard. There are two windows, a protruding vestry and, at the right, a bellcote	14th century	The chancel was added in the 15th century, and the vestry and porch in the 18th century. During the 19th century there were three restorations, but it retains its medieval roof.	II*
St Cadoc	Llangattock-Vibon-Avel, Monmouthshire; 51.837°N 2.7901°W	A red sandstone church with a pyramid tiled roof to the tower	14th century	A medieval church which was extensively restored in the 19th century by Thomas Henry Wyatt. Working first for John Etherington Welch Rolls, and then for his son, John Rolls, 1st Baron Llangattock, Wyatt undertook two phases of restoration, in 1852-1853 and in 1875. The church contains important Victorian stained glass notably work by Charles Eamer Kempe. Members of the Rolls family are buried in the churchyard, including Charles Rolls, an early aviator and co-founder of Rolls-Royce.	II*
St Mary	Llanfair Kilgeddin, Monmouthshire; 51.7731°N 2.9349°W	A stone church seen from the southwest, with a slate roof and red tiled ridge. At the west end is a door a window and a double bellcote; protruding from the south side is a porch	Mid to late 14th century (possible)	Although it was rebuilt in 1875–76, the church retains medieval contents, including a font. The walls are decorated in Arts and Crafts style sgraffito with designs by Heywood Sumner based on the Benedicite.	I
St Afran, St Ieuan and St Sannan	Llantrisant, Anglesey; 53.3277°N 4.4798°W	A T-shaped low stone church with a slate roof seen beyond grave slabs	Late 14th century	Sited in an isolated position by a farm, it became redundant in 1899 when a new church was built nearer the centre of the settlement. By 1970 it was in ruins and without a roof. It was repaired in 1976–77 and came into the care of the charity in 2002.	II*
St Mary	Penllech, Gwynedd; 52.8775°N 4.6466°W	A simple stone church seen almost from the east end. The east window has two lights and a slightly pointed arch, and at the far end the bellcote can be seen	15th century (probable)	The church stands on an old pilgrims' route. Although it was substantially rebuilt in 1840, its interior retains its Georgian style. Since coming under the care of the charity in 2009, repairs have been undertaken.	II*
St David	Llangeview, Monmouthshire; 51.7017°N 2.8742°W	A small stone church seen from an angle; behind the chancel is a slightly higher nave with a bellcote at the far end. A porch protrudes beyond that	Late 15th century	The interior of the church is largely unrestored and contains a 15th-century rood screen with its loft, and rare pre-Victorian box pews and other fittings. It was declared redundant in 1999, and repairs to the exterior have been carried out.	I
St Figael	Llanfigael, Anglesey; 53.3158°N 4.5114°W	A small plain stone church seen from an angle with a bellcote on the near gable, and a simple door and two windows along the side	18th century (probable)	The church was largely rebuilt in 1841 and has retained most of its 19th-century interior. It also contains three fonts, the oldest dating back to the 12th century. Since taking it over, the charity has re-roofed it and reintroduced timber tracery in the windows.	II
St Andrew	Bayvil, Pembrokeshire; 52.0314°N 4.7688°W	A simple stone church seen from the south. The only visible features are a west bellcote and two windows	Early 19th century	This is thought to be an early 19th-century rebuild of a medieval church, and it has been unaltered since. Its features include box pews, a three-decker pulpit with a sounding board, and a 12th-century font.	II*
St Michael's Church	Tremain, Ceredigion; 52.1078°N 4.5782°W		1846–48	John Jones, otherwise known by his bardic name of Talhaiarn, designed the church in Early English style. Jones is acknowledged as the first Welsh architect to have been trained formally, and this is the only building he designed exclusively by himself.	II*
St Dogfael	Meline, Pembrokeshire; 52.0152°N 4.7439°W	A small, single-storey, church with a porch and bellcote to the western end	1864-65	A Victorian church dating from 1864 by Robert Jewell Withers for Sir Thomas Lloyd of Bronwydd Castle.	II
St Mark	Brithdir, Gwynedd; 52.7487°N 3.8332°W	Part of a stone church with a large slate roof seen from a slight angle; on the left is a slightly protruding porch with wooden gates, and on the summit is a bellcote	1895–98	Designed by Henry Wilson, this is considered to be one of the finest Arts and Crafts churches in Wales. It was commissioned in memory of Rev Charles Tooth, founder of St Mark's English Church, Florence.	I
St Teilo	Llandeloy, Pembrokeshire; 51.8975°N 5.1162°W	A simple stone church with a slate roof, a bellcote on the nearest gable and a transept on the right	1926	The church was built from medieval ruins and designed by John Coates Carter based on the principles of the Arts and Crafts Movement. Its interior is dominated by a carved rood screen and a painted reredos.	II
St Philip	Caerdeon, Gwynedd; 52.7436°N 3.9993°W	A small, low-built, church of irregular design	19th century	Built for the Rev. William Edward Jelf in 1862, designed by his brother-in-law, John Louis Petit. Jelf, a High church clergyman wanted a church on his newly acquired estate where his Oxford seminarians could worship in the English language. A furious row ensued, as there was an existing legal obligation to hold services in Welsh in all churches in Welsh-speaking areas. Jelf lost his case in the Court of Arches but was supported by the Bishop of Bangor who used his influence and position in the House of Lords to secure the passing of the English Services in Wales Act in 1863, which allowed for English-language services in certain circumstances, including if the church was a private chapel, as St Philip's was deemed to be.	I
St Lawrence	Gumfreston, Tenby, Pembrokeshire		15th century	St Lawrence’s was built next to three holy wells, which would have drawn people to their healing waters for centuries.The present building was constructed in the 12th-14th centuries, with its large Pembrokeshire-style multi-storied tower added in the 15th century.	II*
St Twrog	Bodwrog, Anglesey, North Wales		15th century	Set in a remote part of the countryside in the middle of Anglesey, St Twrog's Church is dedicated to St Twrog, who was active in the late 5th and early 6th centuries. The present small single-cell church at Bodwrog (the dwelling of Twrog) was built of rubble during the reign of Henry VII (1485-1509). St Twrog’s has remained very much as it was when it was constructed in the late 15th century. It was gifted to Jesus College, Oxford, in 1648 where it paid tithes for over 200 years.	II*
St Deiniol	Worthenbury, Wrexham, Wales		1736-39	St Deiniol’s was constructed between 1736 and 1739 to the designs of architect Richard Trubshaw. The new building cost £810 and was financed by the ancient, local Puleston family of Emral Hall.	I
St Tyfrydog	Llandyfrydog, Anglesey, Wales		Early 19th century	Although the oldest parts of the present building date back to the turn of the 15th century, tradition states that the church was founded in the 5th century by St Tyfrydog.	II*
St Doged	Llanddoged, Conwy, North Wales		Early 19th century	Perched on a pre-Christian mound at the centre of Llanddoged village, this medieval church has an unusual 19th-century interior — its furnishings are arranged much like a Nonconformist chapel.	II*

== Formerly vested churches ==
St Peter's, Corpusty, Norfolk was owned from 1982, then transferred into the care of the Norfolk Churches Trust in 2009.

== Partnership with Ancient Monuments Society ==
From 1993 to 2021, the Friends worked in partnership with the Ancient Monuments Society, sharing an office and staff, operating a joint membership scheme, and publishing a joint newsletter, while retaining separate finances and governing bodies. The co-operation came about because the Friends' founder, Ivor Bulmer-Thomas, was also Secretary and later Chairman of the Ancient Monuments Society. The arrangement was amicably dissolved at the request of the Friends, effective 27 September 2021.

== Notes ==
^{A} This is the date of first construction of the existing building.
