= St Decuman's Church, Rhoscrowther =

Church in Pembrokeshire, Wales

St Decuman's Church
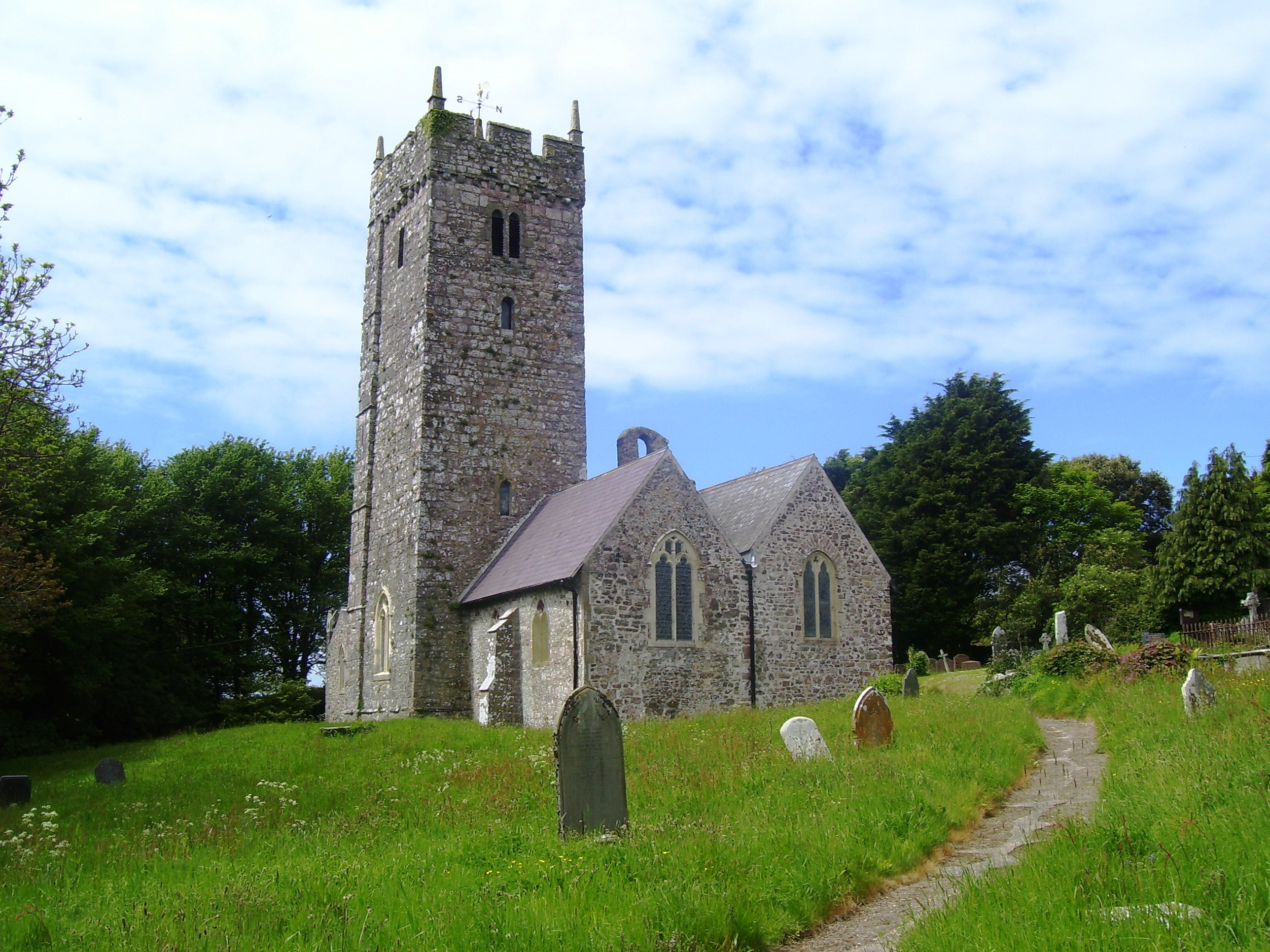
- St Decuman's in 2015

- Location in Pembrokeshire
- 51.68°N 5.03°W
- Location: Rhoscrowther, Pembrokeshire
- Country: Wales

History
- Dedication: St Decuman

Architecture
- Heritage designation: Grade I
- Architectural type: Church

St Decuman's is a Grade I listed building in Rhoscrowther, Pembrokeshire, Wales.

== History ==
The parish church is located a very early Christian site and is dedicated to Saint Decuman. It was the "bishop-house" of the cantref of Penfro and one of the seven principal churches in Dyfed under medieval Welsh law. The church is in the care of Friends of Friendless Churches.

== Description ==
Samuel Lewis in 1833 considered the church "not distinguished by any remarkable architectural details". It was restored from 1852 and the roof was renewed in 1870. There was further restoration in 1910. It was Grade I listed in 1970.

== Structure ==
It is constructed of rubble stone under a slate roof which carries a bellcote. The nave and chancel are possibly 13th-century and the transept, chapel and tower 14th-century.

== Internal features ==
The font, in the north porch, is 12th or 13th century; the nave also has a small Norman font. The church contains a number of tombs and memorials, including two recesses and wall-mounted coffin lids. The oldest dated memorial is a 1716 baroque monument to "F Powell of Greenhill." The pulpit and lectern are 19th-century, and windows range from the 19th and 20th centuries, some as recent as 1960.
