= Sleath Farmhouse, Llangua =

Sleath Farmhouse
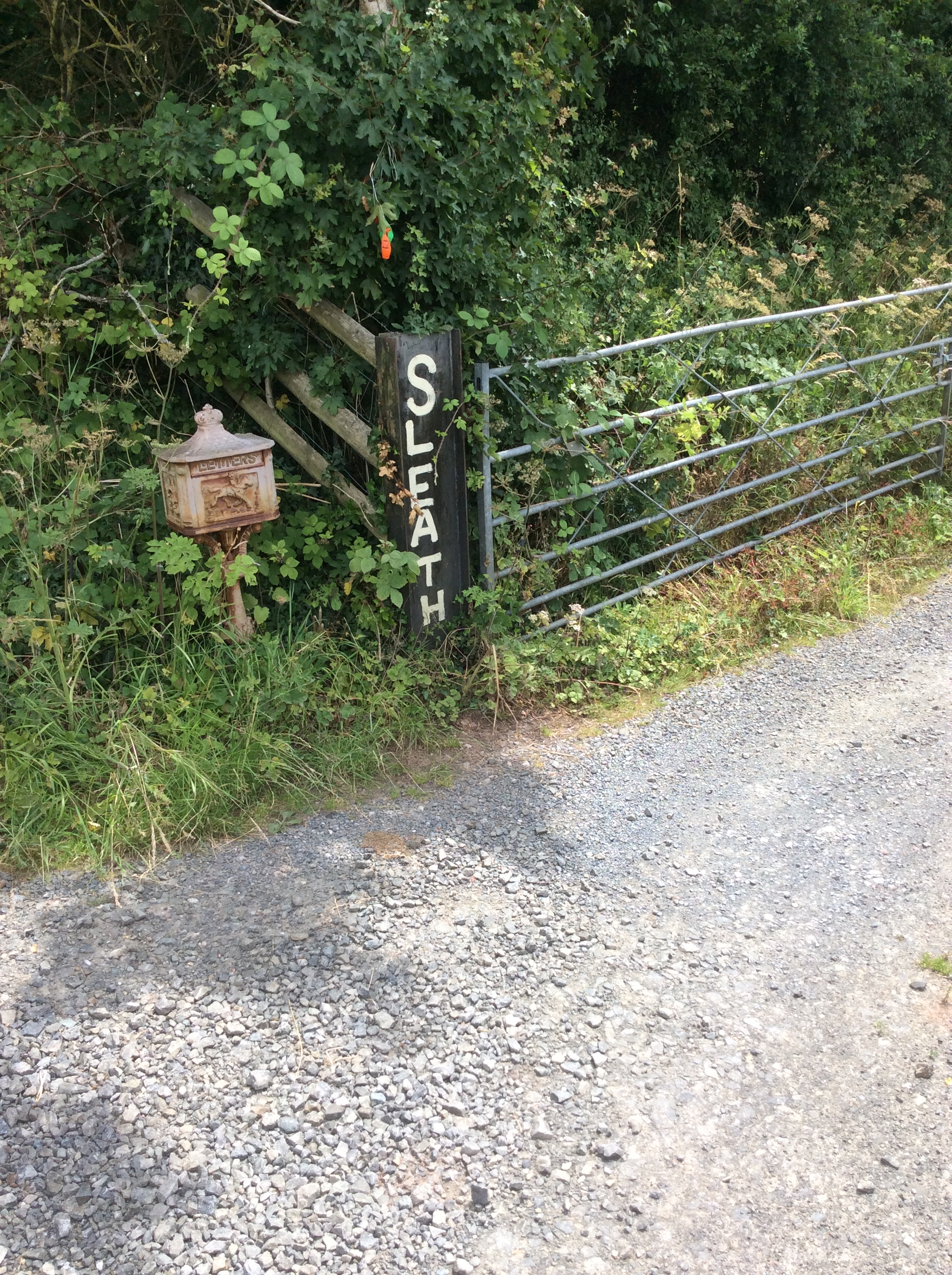
- "extremely unusual and rare survival"

- Location within Monmouthshire
- 51.9261°N 2.8855°W
- Type: Farmhouse
- Location: Llangua, Monmouthshire

History
- Built: c. 1520

Site notes
- Architectural style: Vernacular
- Governing body: Privately owned

Listed Building – Grade II*
- Official name: Sleath Farmhouse (aka Lech Farmhouse)
- Designated: 19 October 2000
- Reference no.: 24180

Sleath Farmhouse, Llangua, Monmouthshire is a farmhouse dating from the mid 16th century. Standing close to the Church of St James, in the far north of the county close to the border with Herefordshire, the farmhouse is a Grade II* listed building, its listing noting that it is an "extremely rare survival" of a Welsh framed hall house.

== History and description ==
Sleath farmhouse, also known as Lech Farm, has been tree-ring dated to c.1520. After the Norman conquest a monastic foundation had been established at Llangua by William FitzOsbern. At the Dissolution of the Monasteries in the early 16th century, the foundation's lands and buildings were granted to the Scudamore family of Kentchurch Court, just across the border in Herefordshire.

The original hall house was constructed just prior to this date, the Oxford Dendrochronology Laboratory giving a specific date of the spring of 1514. The first explicit reference to the farm is in the Kentchurch Muniments where it is referred to as Llech Farm in a lease dated 30 September 1642. The Scudamores retained possession until the early 20th century' and the farmhouse remains a private dwelling. A survey carried out during rebuilding at the farm in 2011 found no significant archaeological remains. Many of the associated farm buildings were derelict as at 2012 but contain significant architectural fragments, including a crook-frame barn dating from the 16th century.

The building is of one and a half storeys and the original timber frame has been encased in subsequent renovations, in brick on three sides and in rubble on the fourth. The original crucks and trusses survive largely intact.
