= Hodgeston Parish Church =

Coordinates: 51.6585°N 4.8503°W

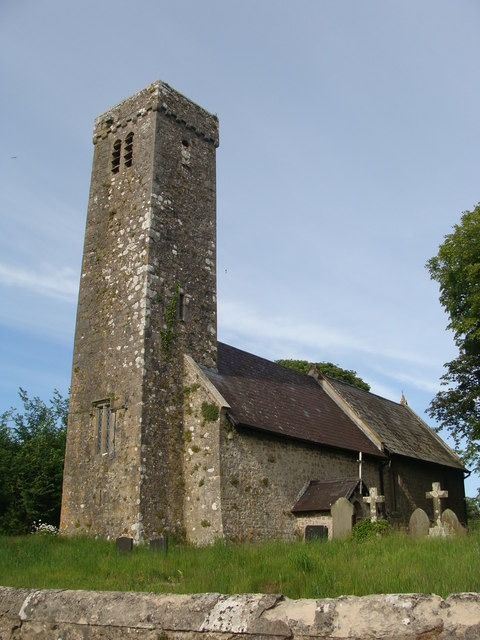
- Hodgeston Parish Church from the south

- Location in Pembrokeshire
- OS grid reference: SS 029 993
- Location: Hodgeston, Pembrokeshire
- Country: Wales
- Denomination: Church in Wales
- Website: Friends of Friendless Churches

History
- Dedication: None recorded

Architecture
- Functional status: Redundant
- Heritage designation: Grade II*
- Designated: 14 May 1970
- Architect: David Brandon (restoration)
- Architectural type: Church
- Style: Gothic
- Groundbreaking: 13th century (probable)

Specifications
- Materials: Limestone, slate roofs

Hodgeston Parish Church is a redundant church in the village of Hodgeston, some 1 mile (1.6 km) southeast of Lamphey, Pembrokeshire, Wales. It is designated by Cadw as a Grade II* listed building, and is under the care of the Friends of Friendless Churches.

== History ==
The nave is thought to date from the 13th century, while the chancel was added during the following century. The tower was built at a later date. At the beginning of the 19th century, the church was described as being "in extreme disrepair". In 1851 the Cambrian Archaeological Association decided that it should be restored, the architect David Brandon was appointed to do the work. The present windows were added as part of this restoration, but many of the internal features were preserved. This restoration was "intended to be a model for future church restorations". The church has no recorded dedication. The church was vested with the charity the Friends of Friendless Churches in 2000, who hold a 999-year lease with effect from 17 December 2000. The charity has introduced into the church a set of stalls originally designed by W. D. Caroe for St David's Church, Exeter.

== Architecture ==
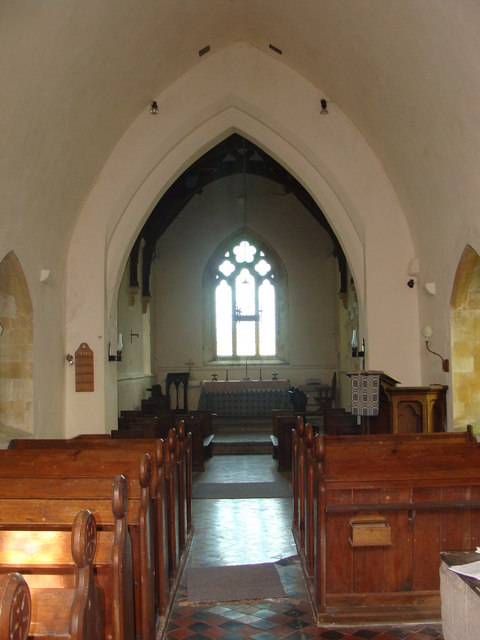
The interior of Hodgeston church

The church is constructed in local limestone with slate roofs. Its plan consists of a nave with a south porch, a chancel, and a west tower. The chancel has a roof at a higher level, and is described as being "rather large in proportion to the rest of the church". The massive tower was "unusually slender" for the era, and is in four stages. On the north face of the tower is a stair turret. In its lowest stage is a 19th-century double west window over the remains of a former narrow window. There are double round-headed bell openings in the top stage, and at the summit of the tower is a parapet supported by corbels. In the north wall of the nave is a blocked doorway.

The chancel measures 9 metres (30 ft) by 5 metres (16 ft). It has a cornice decorated with ballflowers. Along its south wall is a bench, a double piscina dating from the 14th century, and a triple sedilia; these are decorated with ballflowers, crockets and leaf finials. The carving is of high quality, and was probably paid for by Henry de Gower, Bishop of St David's. The chancel is floored with encaustic tiles. The restored east window is in Decorated Gothic style; the other windows in the chancel are in simpler style. The nave measures about 12 metres (39 ft) by 5 metres (16 ft) and it contains a Norman font. The ground floor of the tower is used as a vestry. The bells date from the 15th and 16th centuries.
