= Heritage at Risk Register =

English vulnerable historic assets

An annual Heritage at Risk Register is published by Historic England. The survey is used by national and local government, a wide range of individuals and heritage groups to establish the extent of risk and to help assess priorities for action and funding decisions. This heritage-at-risk data is one of the UK government's official statistics.

Heritage at risk is term for cultural heritage assets that are at risk as a result of neglect, decay, or inappropriate development; or are vulnerable to becoming so.

== England's Heritage at Risk Register ==
The Heritage at Risk Register covers:

- Grade I and II* listed buildings (the baseline register is 1999); Grade II listed buildings in London only (the baseline register is 1991)
- Structural scheduled monuments (base year is 1999) and scheduled monuments (base year is 2009)
- Registered parks and gardens (base year is 2009)
- Registered historic battlefields (base year is 2008)
- Protected wreck sites
- Conservation areas (base year is 2010)

The national register is produced as an online database, and as a print publication with volumes for each of the nine regions of England.

The site's condition and trends are published for each entry. The register is accompanied by a summary that provides key statistics and includes:

- The number of each type of heritage asset that is assessed as at risk.
- The percentage of each designated asset type at risk.
- The number of additions and assets removed from the register each year.

Each entry is given a priority for action, ranging from A: "immediate risk of further rapid deterioration/loss of fabric and no solution agreed", to F: "repair scheme in progress (and where applicable) end user found". It is possible to search the register online – by location, asset type and condition.

Many English planning authorities publish their own registers of heritage at risk or buildings at risk, and several are published on local council websites, e.g. Bolsover District Council and Essex County Council.

=== Origins of the survey ===
The Heritage at Risk Register initially focused on buildings. Historic England developed a methodology for assessing building at risk in the mid-1980s and worked with a number of local planning authorities to carry out surveys of listed buildings to identify which were at risk. Ipswich Borough Council has continued to maintain its buildings at risk register since 1987. Save Britain's Heritage has compiled a register of buildings at risk since 1989.

Historic England, previously named English Heritage, published its first Register of Buildings at Risk in London in 1991. It only included listed buildings in London. This was followed by publication of the national "Buildings at Risk" sample survey in 1992. The Buildings at Risk Register was extended nationally to all Grade I and Grade II* listed buildings and structural scheduled monuments in England in 1998. The 2007 register included 1,235 buildings and structures; of these the 16 in most serious danger had an estimated repair bill of £127.9 million.

This was produced annually by Historic England until 2008, when the scope was extended to include all heritage assets that receive some measure of legal protection through the designation system. Between 2008 and 2010 scheduled monuments, registered parks and gardens, registered battlefields, protected wreck sites and conservation areas (as well as listed buildings) were added to the register.

Since 2009, each annual report has focused on a particular category of asset:

- 2009: conservation areas;
- 2010: places of worship;
- 2011: industrial heritage.

=== Official status ===
The Heritage at Risk Register data produced by Historic England is an official statistic. As such, the methodology for collecting, analysing, and publishing the data follows the regulations set out in the Code of Practice for Official Statistics (January 2009). Details of the methodology are published at the Historic England website.

=== Key statistics ===
Listed in the 2014 Heritage at Risk Register in England are the following:

- 497 conservation areas (6.1% of the total)
- 887 places of worship
- 339 industrial sites
- 4 protected wreck sites
- 889 Grade I and II* listed buildings (4%)
- 3,012 scheduled monuments (15.2%)
- 93 registered parks and gardens (5.7%)
- 6 registered battlefields (13%)

== Other British registers ==
Save Britain's Heritage publishes a catalogue (not freely available) of buildings at risk, as well as other information on its website. The Save register includes information on Grade II listed buildings (outside London) throughout England and Wales.

The Buildings at Risk Register for Scotland is maintained by Historic Environment Scotland, and provides information on properties of architectural or historic merit throughout the country that are considered to be at risk.

Ulster Architectural Heritage Society has compiled an online Register of Buildings at Risk in Northern Ireland, in conjunction with the Northern Ireland Environment Agency (NIEA).

Every two years since 1996, the World Monuments Watch produces a list of international cultural heritage around the globe that is at risk from the forces of nature and the impact of social, political, and economic change.

The Society for the Protection of Ancient Buildings (SPAB) publishes a list of historic buildings in need of repair, or a new use, that are for sale or lease. The list is sent out quarterly to those members who request it; to obtain the list one needs to be a member of SPAB.

== Protecting at-risk sites ==
Different assets have different problems and many are owned privately.

Historic Environment Local Management (HELM) in the UK has identified some common themes:

- Historic assets benefit from sound management and planning policies
- Public and private owners should be encouraged and given practical guidance, including information about grants for which they may be eligible
- Some at-risk sites need significant public resources to allow major repairs, stabilise their condition, or change the way in which the land is being used
- Some assets cannot be reused and the cost of repair cannot always be justified. The long-term solution for these is one of managed decline once the historic significance of the asset has been carefully recorded.

After the Great Recession, English Heritage was concerned that the progress made over the previous decade could soon stall or be reversed due to the economic climate. This was echoed by well-known historians in England and Europe. Mark Adams from the National Museums Liverpool Field Archaeology Unit and Mick Aston, Professor of Archaeology at the University of Bristol, wrote a joint letter to The Times calling on the government to save our heritage. They claim that despite contributing an estimated £20.6 billion annually to the economy, the heritage sector is facing disproportionate cuts both locally and nationally.

In 2017 Historic England (English Heritage's successor institution) began a programme of Heritage Action Zones.

== See also ==
- America's Most Endangered Places
- List of Restoration candidates
- Amenity society
  - The Society for the Protection of Ancient Buildings
  - The Ancient Monuments Society
  - The Council for British Archaeology
  - The Georgian Group, concerned with buildings and planned landscapes dating from between 1700 and 1840
  - The Victorian Society, concerned with buildings built from 1837 to 1914 (also covering Edwardian architecture)
  - The Twentieth Century Society, concerned with buildings dating from 1914 onwards
- SAVE Britain's Heritage, concerned with historic buildings at risk from demolition or decay
- The Garden History Society
- Friends of Friendless Churches
