= St Jerome's Church, Llangwm =

Church of St Jerome
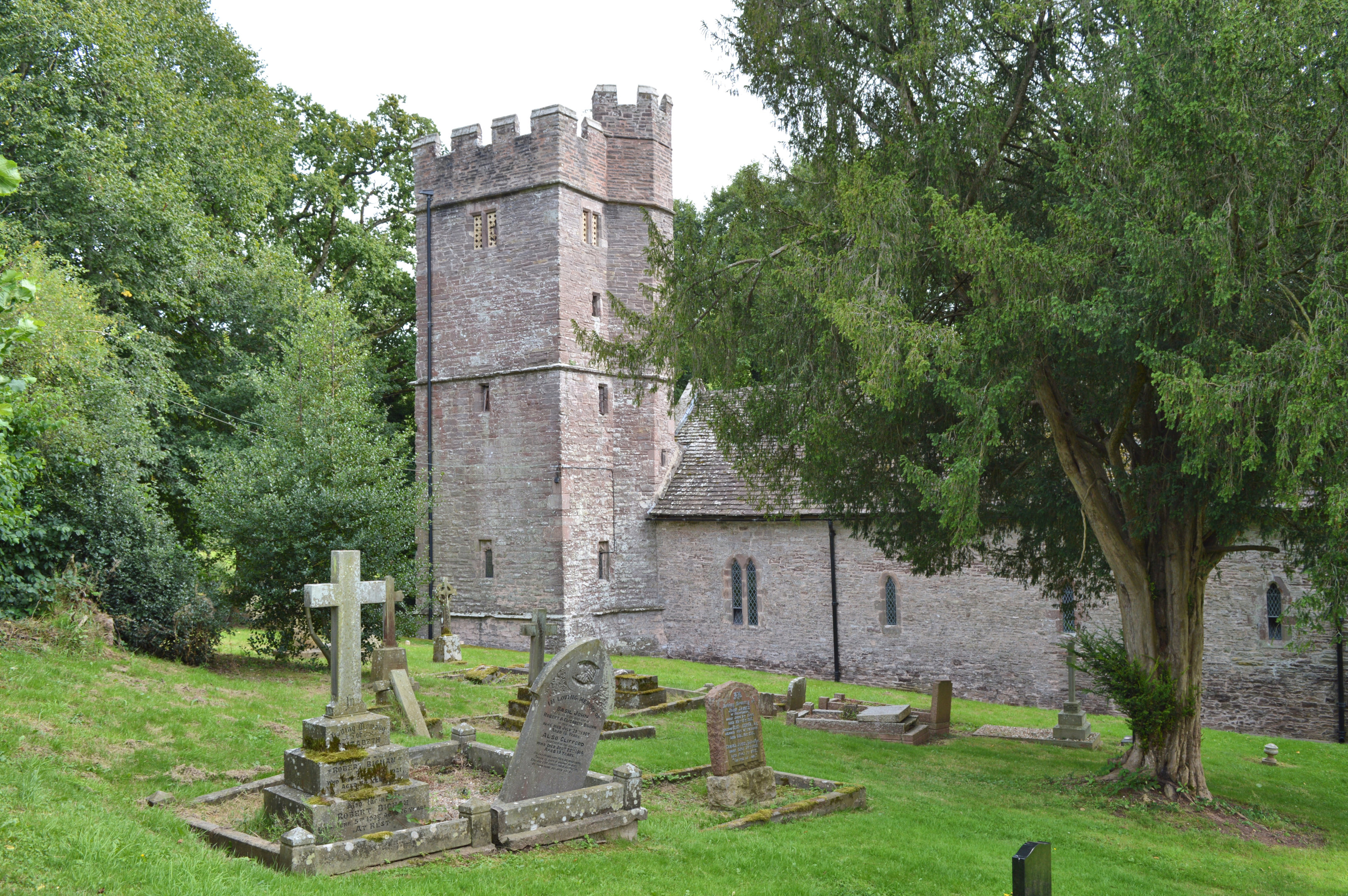
- Church of St Jerome
- 51.696°N 2.830°W
- Location: Llangwm, Monmouthshire
- Country: Wales

History
- Status: Redundant
- Dedication: St Jerome

Architecture
- Heritage designation: Grade I
- Designated: 19 August 1955
- Architect: John Pollard Seddon (restoration)

The Church of St Jerome stands in the settlement of Llangwm Uchaf, (upper) Llangwm, in a remote part of Monmouthshire, Wales. Originally constructed in the twelfth century, in an Early English style, it was heavily restored in the nineteenth century. The church has a "large and unusual" tower, an "outstanding" late medieval rood screen and Victorian interior fittings of "exceptional quality". After being declared redundant by the Church in Wales, the church is now administered by the Friends of Friendless Churches. It was designated a Grade I listed building on 19 August 1955.

== History and architecture ==
The church is constructed of Old Red Sandstone and is first mentioned in 1128. It is built in the Early English style. It has a tower, without buttresses, a large nave and chancel and a porch. Largely ruined by the 19th century, it was comprehensively restored and partly rebuilt in 1863–1869 by John Pollard Seddon. Repairs were carried out by The Friends of Friendless Churches in 2013–2014.

== Interior ==
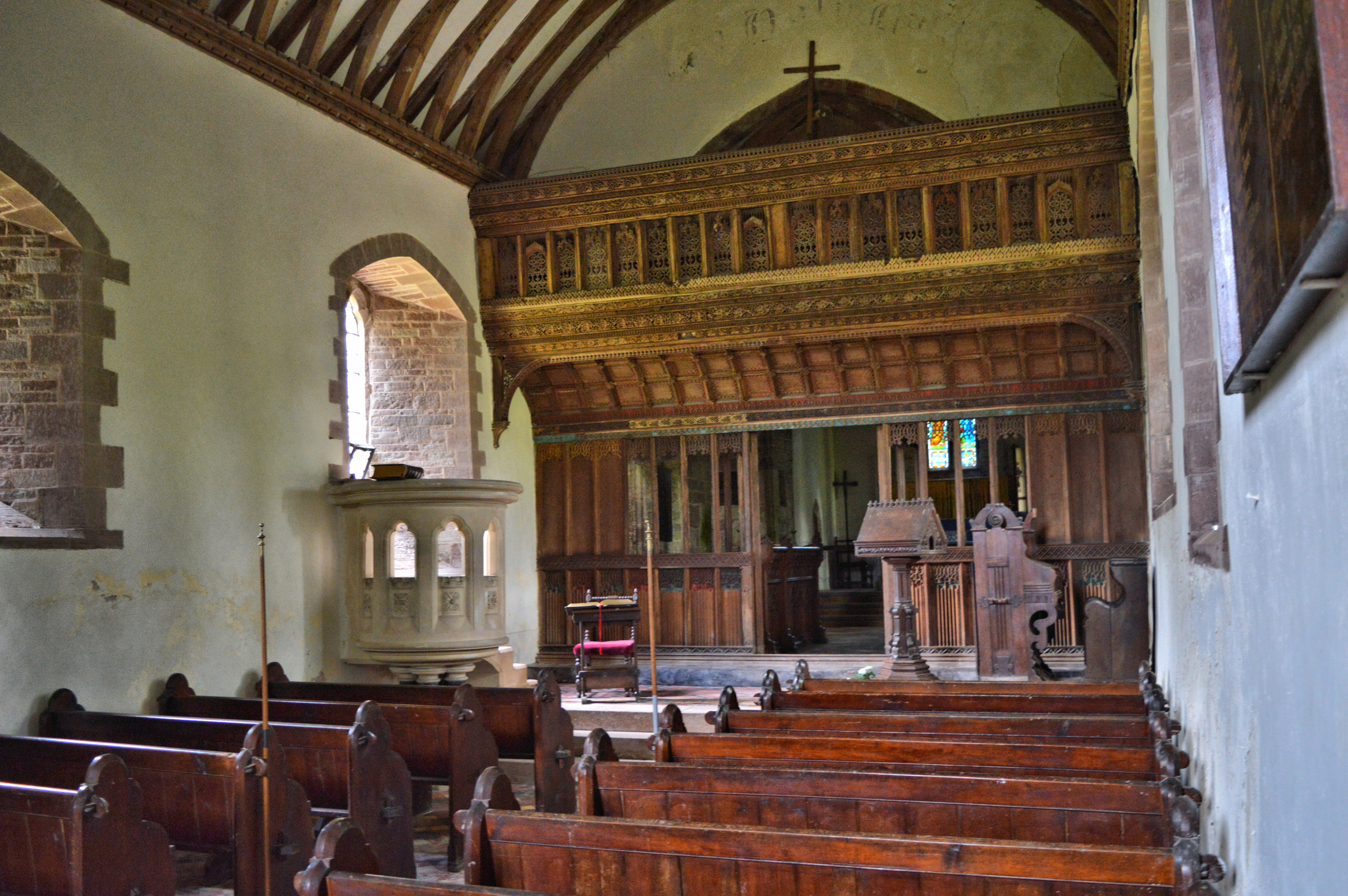
View down the nave to the rood screen

The church contains a remarkable medieval rood screen and rood loft, c. 1500, restored during Seddon's 19th-century reconstruction. This has been described as "a breathtaking sight, rising almost to the roof" and "one of the most spectacular rood screens" in the area. It has been suggested that the village's remoteness saved the screen from destruction by the Puritans. Newman writes that "the glory of the interior is the rood screen and loft", which Cadw describes as "one of the finest in Britain" and of "exceptional richness and complexity". It was heavily, but sympathetically, restored by Seddon. Of the same, latter, date, are the lectern, the font, the choir stalls, the pews and the tiling throughout the church, the whole representative of Seddon "at his most imaginative."

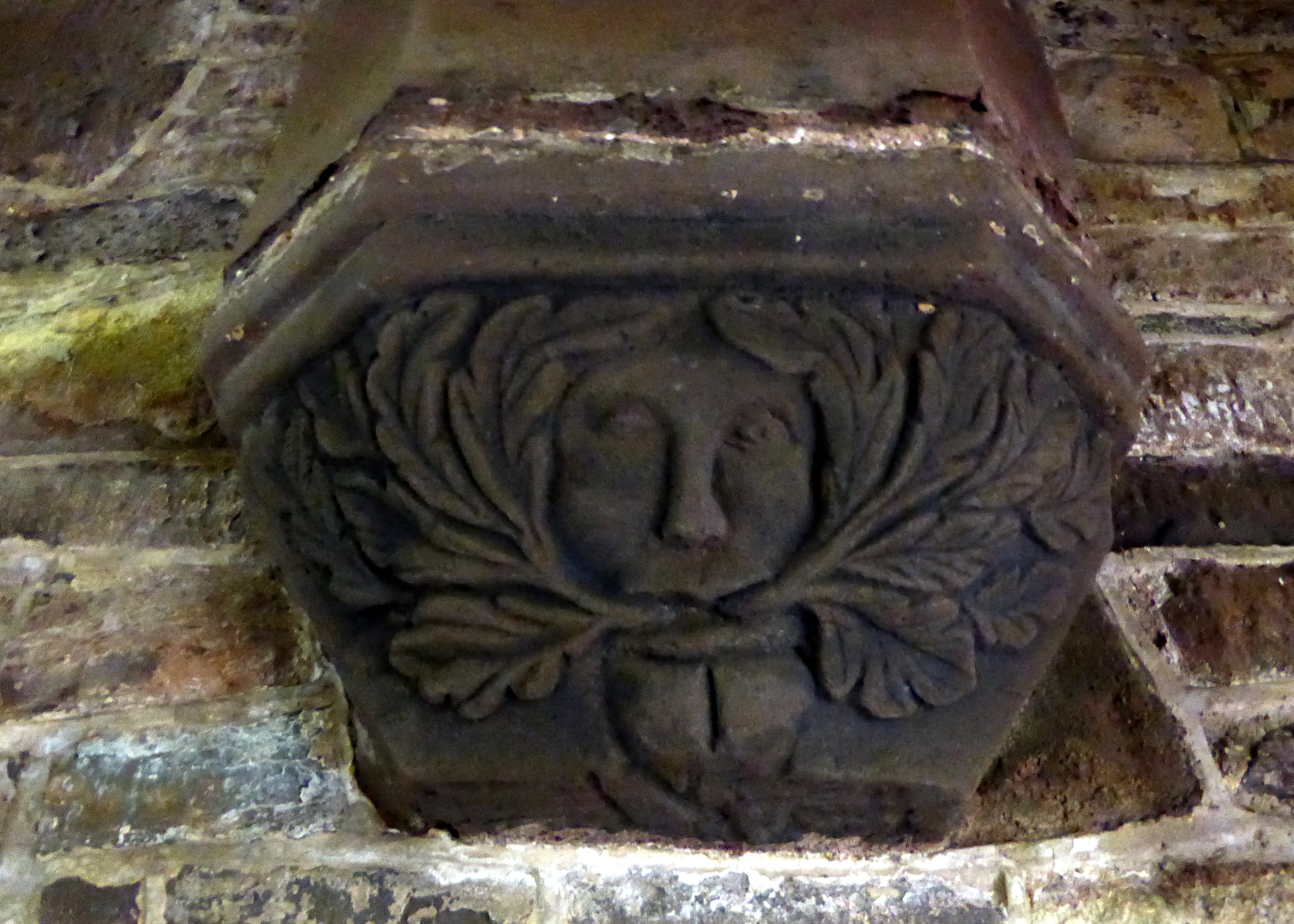
One of the "Green Men"

Behind the screen, carved in the chancel arch, can be seen three "green men with verdure sprouting from their mouths." The sculptures are believed to have inspired Julia, Lady Raglan to write about the "Green Man" motif in her seminal 1939 article "The Green Man in Church Architecture" in The Folklore Journal.

The 17th-century cleric Walter Cradock is buried in the church. He was born at Trefela, 1.5 miles (2.4 km) to the south. He was inspired to become an Independent by William Wroth, a fellow Dissenter.

Alun Withey, a historian at Swansea University, has examined in some detail a dispute of 1671 over the church seating arrangements. He reports that the village was ablaze, with "divers[e] variances, quarrels and debates", even lawsuits, to "the utter destruction and overthrow of manie". It was left to the churchwarden, the respected local yeoman farmer John Gwin, to settle matters. Gwin's notebook containing his seating plan still survives, giving us, Withey argues, a rare insight into the world of parochial life in 17th-century Wales, and thus contributes greatly to our general understanding of Welsh history.

The church is a Grade I listed building. It has been declared redundant and is in the care of the Friends of Friendless Churches. It was repaired in 2013–2014.
