= Strict and Particular Baptist Chapel, Waddesdon =

Coordinates: 51.8289°N 0.9085°W

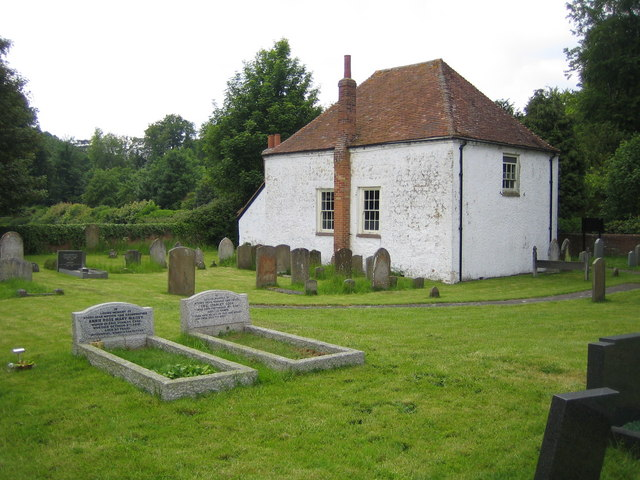
- Strict and Particular Baptist Chapel, Waddesdon, from the rear

- Location in Buckinghamshire
- OS grid reference: SP 753 150
- Location: Waddesdon Hill, Waddesdon, Buckinghamshire
- Country: England
- Denomination: Baptist
- Website: Friends of Friendless Churches

Architecture
- Functional status: Redundant
- Heritage designation: Grade II
- Designated: 21 December 1967
- Architectural type: Chapel
- Groundbreaking: 1792
- Completed: 19th century
- Closed: 1976

Specifications
- Materials: Colourwashed stone, tiled roof

The Strict and Particular Baptist Chapel, is a former Strict Baptist chapel in Waddesdon Hill, near the village of Waddesdon, Buckinghamshire, England (grid reference SP 753 150). The chapel is recorded in the National Heritage List for England as a designated Grade II listed building, and is under the care of the Friends of Friendless Churches. It is the only nonconformist chapel owned by the Friends.

== History ==
The chapel was founded in 1792 by Francis Cox. A porch on the front of the chapel and an extension on the right side were added in the 19th century. It continued in use until it closed in 1976. It then came under the care of the charity the Friends of Friendless Churches. The charity holds its freehold dated 31 December 1986. Since the charity took it over, internal repairs have been carried out; the associated stables were conserved in 2005–06; and conservation work was done to the exterior in 2009–10.

== Architecture ==
The chapel is constructed in colourwashed stone, and it has a tiled roof. At the rear is a brick chimney. On the front of the chapel facing the road is a central porch with a sash window on each side. At the rear there are two similar windows, and two more similar windows on both end walls at a higher level. The extension has a door and two casement windows. Inside the chapel are a gallery, benches and a pulpit, all of which are original, although the pulpit has been moved from its original position. In front of the pulpit is a baptismal pool for full immersion. Also in the chapel is a fireplace, and simple memorials, most of which are painted.
