= Llangwm, Monmouthshire =

Coordinates: 51.696°N 2.830°W

Llangwm
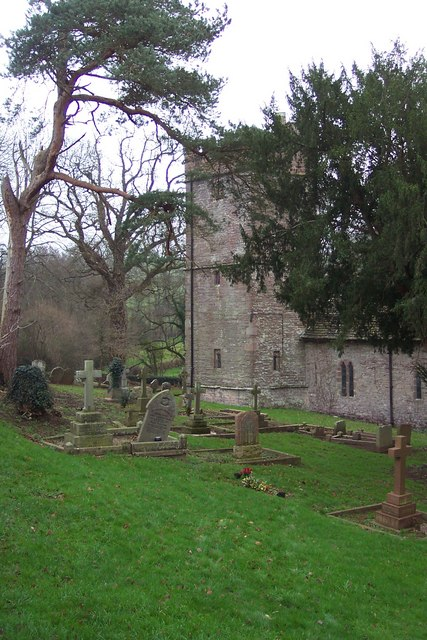
- St. Jerome's Church, Llangwm Uchaf

- Location within Monmouthshire
- Population: 440 (2011)
- OS grid reference: SO425005
- Community: Llantrisant Fawr
- Principal area: Monmouthshire
- Preserved county: Gwent
- Country: Wales
- Sovereign state: United Kingdom
- Post town: USK
- Postcode district: NP15
- Dialling code: 01291
- Police: Gwent
- Fire: South Wales
- Ambulance: Welsh
- UK Parliament: Monmouth

Llangwm (Welsh: Llan-gwm) is a small rural village and former community, now in the community of Llantrisant Fawr, in Monmouthshire, south east Wales. It is located 3 miles (4.8 km) east of Usk, on the B4235 Chepstow to Usk road. The main village is at Llangwm Uchaf ("Upper Llangwm"), with a smaller and more dispersed settlement about 1 mile (1.6 km) to the north-east at Llangwm Isaf ("Lower Llangwm").The other settlement in the community is Llansoy. In 2022 the community was abolished and merged with Llantrisant Fawr.

== History and amenities ==
=== Church of St. Jerome ===
Llangwm Uchaf is best known for the Church of St. Jerome. The oldest parts of the church date from the 12th century, built in the Early English style. The church was partly rebuilt by J. P. Seddon in the 1860s.

The church contains a remarkable medieval rood screen and rood loft, c. 1500, restored during Seddon's 19th-century reconstruction. It has been described as a breathtaking sight, rising almost to the roof and one of the most spectacular rood screens in south Wales. It has been suggested that the village's remoteness saved the screen from destruction by the Puritans.

An ancient structure ornamented with trellis-work, possibly a stoup, a lamp or a piscina, was found built into the wall during restoration. Three "Green Men" with foliage issuing from their mouths are carved in the chancel arch.

Buried in the chancel of the church, though no memorial to him survives, is Walter Cradock, the 17th-century cleric born at Trefela 1.5 miles (2.4 km) south of the church. He was inspired to become an Independent by fellow church Dissenter William Wroth.

Swansea University historian Dr Alun Withey has examined in some detail a 1671 dispute over the church seating arrangements. He reports that the village was ablaze, with divers[e] variances, quarrels and debates even lawsuits, to the utter destruction and overthrow of manie. It was left to the churchwarden, respected local yeoman farmer John Gwin, to settle matters. Gwin's notebook containing his seating plan still survives, giving us, Withey argues, a rare insight into the world of parochial life in 17th-century Wales, and thus contributes greatly to our general understanding of Welsh history.

The church is a Grade I listed building. It has been declared redundant and is in the care of the Friends of Friendless Churches. It was repaired in 2013–2014.

=== Church of St. John ===
The parish has a smaller second church, that of St. John at Llangwm Isaf. This church is located on the route to the Church of St. Jerome and is also in the Early English style, restored in the 19th century.

=== Baptist chapel ===
The Baptist chapel, situated at the south west end of the village, was built in 1840 on land given by Cradock Gwynne Watkins of the village. The building was financed by the local Baptists who, at that time, attended "Peniel", an older (now ruined) chapel on Golden Hill of which the chapel at Llangwm was a branch. The chapel is built of cement render, with a datestone of 1840. The interior has a gallery and late-19th-century pews. There is seating for approximately 100 persons. The chapel, which is mentioned in Sir Joseph Bradney's A History of Monmouthshire (1923), was designated a Grade II listed building on 12 October 2000.

=== Gaer Fawr hill fort ===
The Iron Age hill fort at Gaer Fawr (meaning in Welsh, "great fort"), about 1 mile (1.6 km) south-east of Llangwm Uchaf, is one of the largest hill forts in Monmouthshire, and commands wide views over the Vale of Usk to the west, north and east.

=== Allt-y-Bela ===
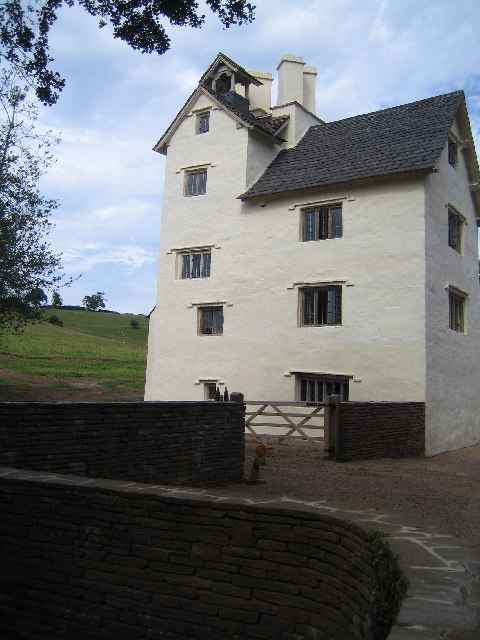
Allt-y-Bela in 2005, the tower

Allt-y-Bela is a mid-15th century house in Llangwm Uchaf. It is a Grade II* listed building.

Allt-y-Bela was built as a hall house in the mid-15th century, originally as a traditional, single-storey, cruck-frame building with wooden mullions and leaded lights. About a century later a first floor was added with dormer windows and chimneys. In 1599 the wealthy Midlands wool merchant Roger Edwards, the founder of Usk Grammar School, added a three-storey Renaissance tower.

Visiting in the late 1940s, when the owner was farmer Mr Moseley, the local writer and historian Fred Hando noted the builder's inscription mark – 1599, E.R. R.E – and was also shown the central spiral staircase, built around a massive single tree-trunk newel post. Curiously the stair treads showed holes through which bell-ropes would once have passed and there was a tiny bellcote, with a bellframe, at the very top of the tower. The bell had reputedly been moved to the nearby church of St David's Church, Llangeview. The Edwards family was part of an extreme religious sect and it has been suggested that the bell would have been used to call members to services.

By 1980 one side of the tower had fallen and by 2000 the house was described as "now miserably derelict". After years of neglect the property was the subject of a compulsory purchase order, with no compensation, by Monmouthshire County Council and in 2001 the council handed it to the preservation body the Spitalfields Historic Buildings Trust. The Trust secured a £300,000 grant from Cadw, borrowed the same amount from the Architectural Heritage Fund, and also planned to spend £400,000 of its own funds on the restoration.

The name Allt-y-Bela derives from the Welsh, meaning "wooded heights or cliff of the wolf." Today the property is run as a bed and breakfast guest house.
