= St Michael's Church, Tremain =

Coordinates: 52.1078°N 4.5782°W

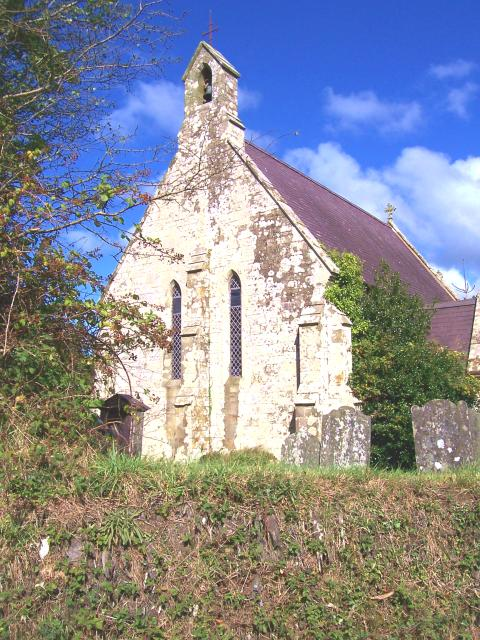
- West front of St Michael's Church, Tremain

- Location in Ceredigion
- Location: Tremain (or Tremaen), Ceredigion
- Country: Wales
- Denomination: Church in Wales
- Website: Friends of Friendless Churches

History
- Status: Former parish church

Architecture
- Functional status: Redundant
- Heritage designation: Grade II*
- Designated: 17 August 2009
- Architect: John Jones
- Architectural type: Church
- Style: Gothic Revival
- Groundbreaking: 1846
- Completed: 1848
- Closed: 2008

Specifications
- Materials: Pwntan sandstone Slate roofs

St Michael's Church, Tremain, is a redundant church in the hamlet of Tremain (or Tremaen), Ceredigion, Wales. It has been designated by Cadw as a Grade II* listed building, and is under the care of the Friends of Friendless Churches.

== History ==
The church was built in 1846–48 on the site of an earlier church. The architect was John Jones, who had trained in London with George Gilbert Scott and William Moffatt. Jones was also a poet, known by his bardic name of Talhaiarn. Jones is acknowledged as the first architect in Wales to have received a formal training, and this is the only building to have been designed exclusively by him. In 2008 the local rector applied to have the church closed. At that time it was listed at Grade II, but in August 2009 Cadw raised its Grade to II*, and in 2012 it was vested in the Friends of Friendless Churches.

== Architecture ==
St Michael's is constructed in Pwntan sandstone quarried locally at Tan-y-Groes, and has slate roofs. Its plan consists of a nave, a north aisle, a south porch, and a chancel. At the west end is a stepped single bellcote with a coped gable, and at the northwest is a small octagonal turret. The windows are all lancets, with a three-light east window and a two narrow lancets at the west end of the nave. On the gables are cross finials.

Inside the church the walls are rendered, and support five oil lamps, three on the north walls and two on the south. The grey stone font dates from the 13th century, and was originally in the earlier church. It is square and stands on a thick cylindrical shaft and a square base with steps. The pews and pulpit are in stained pine. Between the nave and the north aisle is a pine screen, and the aisle contains pews that are smaller than those in the nave. In the chancel the choir stalls are also in stained pine, and have large poppyheads.
