= Llantrisant Fawr =

Coordinates: 51.68°N 2.87°W

- Community
- Location within Monmouthshire
- Principal area: Monmouthshire
- Country: Wales
- Sovereign state: United Kingdom
- Police: Gwent
- Fire: South Wales
- Ambulance: Welsh
- List of places UK Wales Monmouthshire Map of the community

Llantrisant Fawr is a community in Monmouthshire, Wales. Villages within the community include Llantrisant and Llanllowell. The community council has three wards: Llantrisant, Llangwm and Llansoy, after Llangwm community was absorbed with boundary changes in May 2022. The population in the 2011 census was 475.
