= St Mary's Church, Hardmead =

Coordinates: 52.1196°N 0.6358°W

- Church of the Assumption of the Blessed Virgin Mary, Hardmead
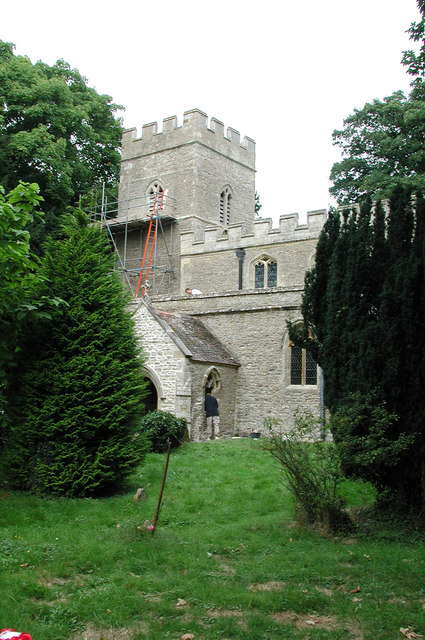
- St Mary's Church, Hardmead, from the south

- Location in Buckinghamshire
- OS grid reference: SP 935 477
- Location: Hardmead, Buckinghamshire
- Country: England
- Denomination: Anglican
- Website: Friends of Friendless Churches

History
- Dedication: Assumption of Mary

Architecture
- Functional status: Redundant
- Heritage designation: Grade I
- Designated: 17 November 1966
- Architectural type: Church
- Groundbreaking: 13th century
- Completed: 15th century

Specifications
- Materials: Stone with lead and tiled roofs

St Mary's Church is a redundant Anglican church in the village of Hardmead, Buckinghamshire, England. It is recorded in the National Heritage List for England as a designated Grade I listed building, and is under the care of the Friends of Friendless Churches.

== History ==
The west tower of the church dates from the 13th century, the chancel from slightly later, and the clerestory and the top stage of the tower were added in the 15th century. It formerly served a medieval village, but this has disappeared. After the church became redundant it was proposed to convert it into a house, but it was acquired by the charity the Friends of Friendless Churches and is now managed by the Friends of Hardmead. The church was vested in the charity in 1982, which holds a 99-year lease with effect from 7 September 1982. Services are very occasionally held in the church as part of the local SCAN Parish (Sherington with Chicheley, North Crawley, Astwood and Hardmead).

== Architecture ==
St Mary's is constructed in stone. The nave and aisles have flat lead roofs while the chancel roof is tiled. Its plan consists of a two-bay nave with north and south aisles and a clerestory, a chancel, a south porch, and a west tower. The tower is without buttresses, and has traceried bell openings. At the summit is a battlemented parapet. The parapets of the nave are also battlemented, while those of the aisles are plain. The east window and the two windows in the walls of the chancel contain Decorated tracery. The double arcade dates from the 14th century.

The font dates from the 15th century and is carved with tracery; the bench ends date from a similar period. In the north aisle are monuments to the Catesby family. The most prominent is a wall monument to the memory of Francis Catesby who died in 1636, and there is a brass to another Francis Catesby who died in 1556. In the chancel are monuments to the Shedden family. One of these is to Robert Shedden who died in 1849 on the yacht Nancy Dawson, after an unsuccessful expedition to find Sir John Franklin. Under the memorial is a carving in relief of the yacht. The organ was made in about 1837 by J. W. Walker of London, and was restored in about 1995 by Robert Shaftoe of Pavenham. There is a ring of three bells. The oldest bell was cast in about 1399 by Robert Chamberlain, the next was made about 1499 by an unknown caster, and the third bell was cast about 1599, possibly by William Rufford. They are no longer ringable.
