= St Peter's Church, Wickham Bishops =

Coordinates: 51.7698°N 0.6434°E

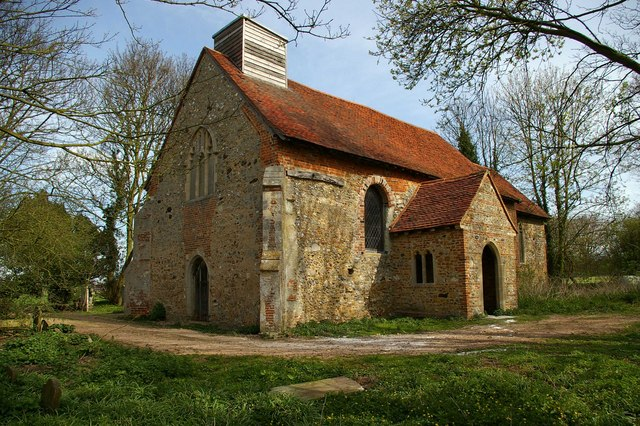
- St Peter's Church, Wickham Bishops, from the southwest

- Location in Essex
- OS grid reference: TL 825 112
- Location: Wickham Bishops, Essex
- Country: Essex
- Denomination: Anglican
- Website: St Peter's, Wickham Bishops

History
- Dedication: Saint Peter

Architecture
- Functional status: Redundant
- Heritage designation: Grade II*
- Designated: 14 November 1985
- Architectural type: Church
- Groundbreaking: 11th century
- Closed: 1970

Specifications
- Materials: Flint rubble, puddingstone, septaria, Roman tile, and brick. Red tiled roofs

St Peter's Church is a redundant church in the village of Wickham Bishops, Essex, England. It is recorded in the National Heritage List for England as a designated Grade II* listed building, and is cared for by the Friends of Friendless Churches.

== History ==
The church originated in the 11th century. In the Domesday Book of 1086, the manor of Wickham Bishops was recorded as belonging to the Bishops of London and it has been suggested that the church was built as a private chapel for the bishops. The church was restored in about 1850, but a new church dedicated to St Bartholomew was then built on a different site. The font, holy water stoup and parish chest were moved to the new church. St Peter's continued to be a chapel of ease to the new church but it became derelict and was threatened with demolition. In 1970 it became redundant. The church was taken into the care of the charity the Friends of Friendless Churches in 1975. The charity holds a 999-year lease with effect from 1 January 1975. Some restoration work has been carried out since then, but this has been disturbed by vandalism.

Since 1994 the church has been used as a studio by the stained glass artist Benjamin Finn. The windows of the church have been reglazed with oak tracery designed by Julian Limentani. The church now contains a new altar which was sculpted by Rory Young, and a statue of Saint Peter by Nicholas Hague. The original font has been returned from the new church. Benjamin Finn has been commissioned to create a new east window, to be financed by a grant from the Cottam Will Trust. In 2007 areas of 13th-century geometrical patterns were discovered on the walls; conservation work has been carried out in these.

== Architecture ==
St Peter's is constructed in a mixture of flint rubble, puddingstone, septaria, Roman tile, and brick. It has red tiled roofs. The plan of the church consists of a nave, a chancel, and a gabled south porch. At the west end is a belfry with weatherboarding.
