= St Odoceus' Church, Llandawke =

Coordinates: 51.7732°N 4.4904°W

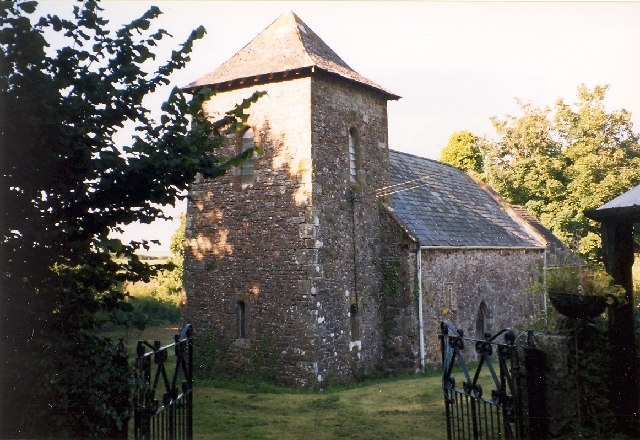
- St Odoceus' Church, Llandawke, from the southwest

- Location in Carmarthenshire
- OS grid reference: SN 282 112
- Location: Llandawke, Carmarthenshire
- Country: Wales
- Denomination: Church in Wales
- Website: Friends of Friendless Churches

History
- Dedication: St Odoceus

Architecture
- Functional status: Redundant
- Heritage designation: Grade II
- Designated: 30 November 1966
- Architectural type: Church
- Style: Gothic
- Groundbreaking: 13th century

Specifications
- Materials: Sandstone with slate roofs

St Odoceus' Church, Llandawke, is a redundant church situated in a hollow near the road between Llandawke and Laugharne in Carmarthenshire, Wales. It has been designated by Cadw as a Grade II listed building, and is under the care of the Friends of Friendless Churches.

== History ==
The church dates from the 13th century and it was remodelled during the following century by Sir Guy De Brian, the Lord Marcher of Laugharne. The church was restored during the Victorian era. When it was inspected by Cadw in 1988 it was described as being "partly overgrown". It was taken under the care of the charity, the Friends of Friendless Churches in 2006, when it was in "a state of dereliction". The charity holds a 999-year lease with effect from 24 April 2006. A local group of Friends has been formed to assist in its repair and restoration.

== Architecture ==
=== Exterior ===
It is constructed in local sandstone with slate roofs in Gothic style. Its plan consists of a four-bay nave without aisles, a three-bay chancel that is lower and narrower, and a west tower. The tower is squat, in two stages, and it tapers as it rises. In the upper stage, on the west and south sides are lancet bell openings. Its roof is pyramidal, and on its north side is a stair turret. On the apex of the gable at the east end of the nave is a crucifix finial. The entrance is on the south side of the church through an arched doorway. To the left of the entrance is a two-light, square-headed Perpendicular window and to its right is a two-light Decorated window with Victorian tracery. The windows in the chancel also have two lights, those on the north wall being square-headed, and those on the east and south walls having pointed heads.

=== Interior ===
On the south side of the chancel is a piscina and a recess that formerly contained a tomb. On the north side is a 14th-century effigy of a figure thought to be that of Margaret Marlos. It is broken into three pieces, which is said to be a reference to her being cut into three pieces by robbers. It was placed in the church in 1902. Also in the church is an early Christian stone slab dating from the 5th or 6th century. It is carved with Ogham and Roman inscriptions. The oak altar dating from 1882 is "elaborately not to say wildly carved" with representations of flowers.
