= Cote Baptist Church =

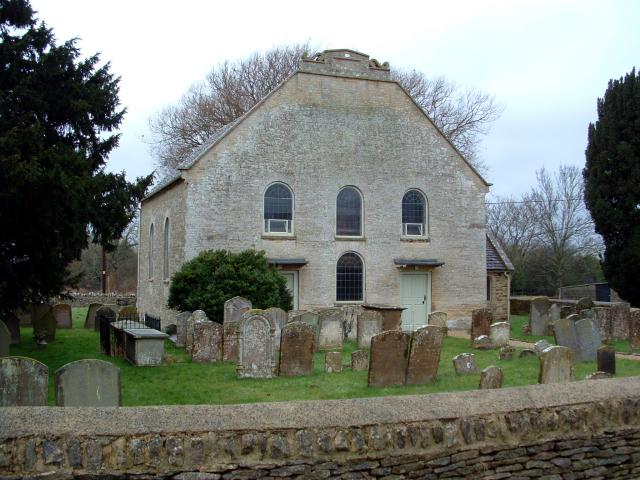
- Entrance front of Cote Baptist Church

- Location in Oxfordshire
- 51.7255°N 1.4930°W
- Location: Cote, Oxfordshire, England
- OS grid reference: SP 351 031

History
- Founded: 1703
- Built: 1703–04

Site notes
- Architectural style: Georgian
- Restored: 1750s, 1850s
- Governing body: Historic Chapels Trust

Listed Building – Grade II*
- Designated: 8 October 1981

Cote Baptist Church stands in Shifford Road, Cote, 1 mile (2 km) to the east of Aston and 4 miles (6 km) to the east of Bampton, in Oxfordshire, England. It is a redundant Baptist chapel in the care of Friends of Friendless Churches. It is recorded in the National Heritage List for England as a designated Grade II* listed building, one of only 29 Grade II* Baptist chapels in England.

== Early history ==
The congregation of Baptists who built the chapel originated in Longworth, a village on the other side of the River Thames, in the middle of the 17th century. The land for a chapel in Cote was given by John Williams in 1703 and the chapel built on the land was licensed for meetings the following year. In the 1750s it was either rebuilt or enlarged, and a gallery was added in 1756. In the late 1850s the chapel was extensively restored, and the double gable at the front was replaced by a single gable, which hid the roof valley behind it. At the same time, the chapel was re-floored and the vestries were enlarged, new pews and galleries were added, and a new pulpit was placed at the west end which replaced the previous pulpit on the south wall. An organ by Henry Jones of London was added in 1867, and electric light was installed in 1948. From 9 January 1945 until 25 June 1957 the Church was the home to the 1st Aston Boys' Brigade Company under the captainship of Alan J Hook.

== Architecture, fittings and furniture ==
The chapel is constructed in limestone rubble and has a stone slate roof. It is in two stories and its plan consists of a single cell with a single-story extension. Its architectural style is Georgian. The entrance front has a flat-topped gable surmounted by a plaque with scrolls at each end. In the lower storey is a central window with a semicircular arch, which stands between two doors. In the upper storey and elsewhere in the building are windows in a similar style. All the internal fittings date from 1869, and include box pews with hinged doors and, at the west end, a pulpit with a panelled front, a reader's desk and a lectern.

== Recent history and present day ==
The chapel was taken over in 1993 by the Historic Chapels Trust. A restoration programme costing £250,000 was carried out and the building was reopened in 2000. The restoration included the provision of a kitchen, toilets, and committee rooms.

In 2025, the church was transferred into the care of Friends of Friendless Churches. The church community now meets in the Cote Fellowship Centre.

== External features ==
Around the chapel is a burial ground containing headstones, some of which date from the 18th century and are elaborately carved. It contains the chest tomb of William Williams who died in 1830. This tomb is constructed in limestone and has corner balusters; it is a Grade II listed building.

== See also ==
- List of chapels preserved by the Historic Chapels Trust
