= Llandawke =

Hamlet in Carmarthenshire, Wales

Coordinates: 51.7735°N 4.4913°W

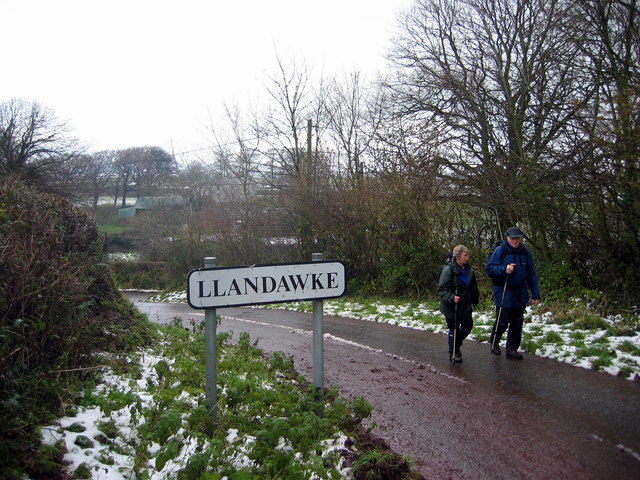

Llandawke (Welsh: Llan-dawg) is a small settlement in Carmarthenshire, Wales, situated roughly 1 mile from Laugharne, toward Tenby.

It contains the now redundant 13th century church of St Odoceus, which lay within the parish toward nearby Laugharne.

== See also ==
List of places in Carmarthenshire
