= Rhoscrowther =

Village and parish in Pembrokeshire, Wales

Coordinates: 51.68°N 5.03°W

Rhoscrowther: Welsh: Rhoscrowdder
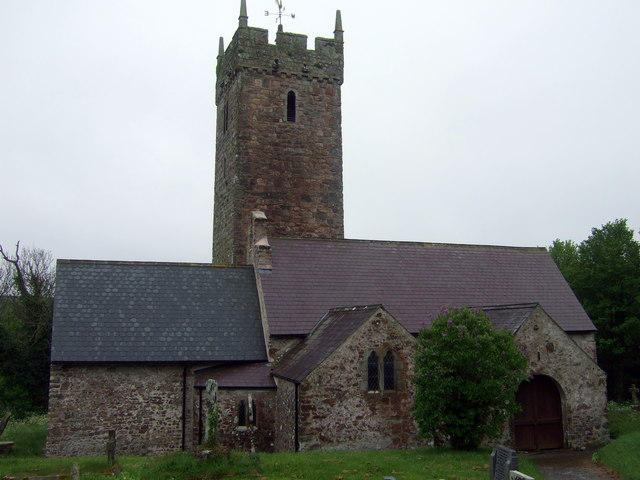
- Parish church of St Decuman

- Location within Pembrokeshire
- OS grid reference: SM903023
- Community: Angle
- Principal area: Pembrokeshire
- Country: Wales
- Sovereign state: United Kingdom
- Police: Dyfed-Powys
- Fire: Mid and West Wales
- Ambulance: Welsh

Rhoscrowther (Welsh: Rhoscrowdder) was a village, ecclesiastical parish and civil parish in Pembrokeshire, Wales on the south shore of the Milford Haven Waterway. The placename is Welsh and perhaps means "crwth-player's moor". It is part of the community of Angle.

== History ==
In 1833, the parish population was 231, mostly employed in agriculture.

Much of the parish and almost all the medieval village except the church was cleared during the establishment of the BP oil terminal southwest of the village in 1961 and during the construction of the Texaco Pembroke Refinery immediately to the north in 1964.

At 18:20 on 2 June 2011, a 730 cubic metre storage tank exploded killing four refinery workers and seriously injuring a fifth. Ten fire and rescue appliances attended the scene, along with many other emergency services. The fire was extinguished within 90 minutes.

On 1 August 2011 Valero Energy acquired the Pembroke Refinery from Chevron, as well as the marketing and logistics assets, for $730 million, excluding working capital, which was valued at approximately $1 billion. The Pembroke plant is one of the largest and most complex refineries in Western Europe with a total throughput capacity of 270,000 barrels (43,000 m^{3}) per day and a Nelson complexity index rating of 11.8. This puts Valero at a total of 15 refineries and 2.9 million barrels (460,000 m^{3}) per day of throughput capacity overall, solidifying the company's standing as the world's largest independent refinery.

Valero also purchased ownership interest in four major pipelines and eleven fuel terminals, a 14,000-barrel (2,200 m^{3})-per-day aviation fuel business, and a network of more than 1,000 Texaco-branded wholesale sites, which is the largest branded dealer network in the United Kingdom and the second-largest in Ireland. Valero has continued with the Texaco brand in these markets.

== Church ==
The church is on a very early Christian site and was dedicated to Saint Decuman, whence the settlement's original name Llandegeman or Llandegman. It was the "bishop-house" of the cantref of Penfro and one of the seven principal churches in Dyfed under medieval Welsh law. The church, which is a Grade I Listed building, is in the care of Friends of Friendless Churches.

== Past census ==
The Census records for the parish are 219 (1801): 201 (1851): 113 (1901): 131 (1951): 176 (1981)
