= St James's Church, Llangua =

Coordinates: 51.9268°N 2.889°W

St James's Church
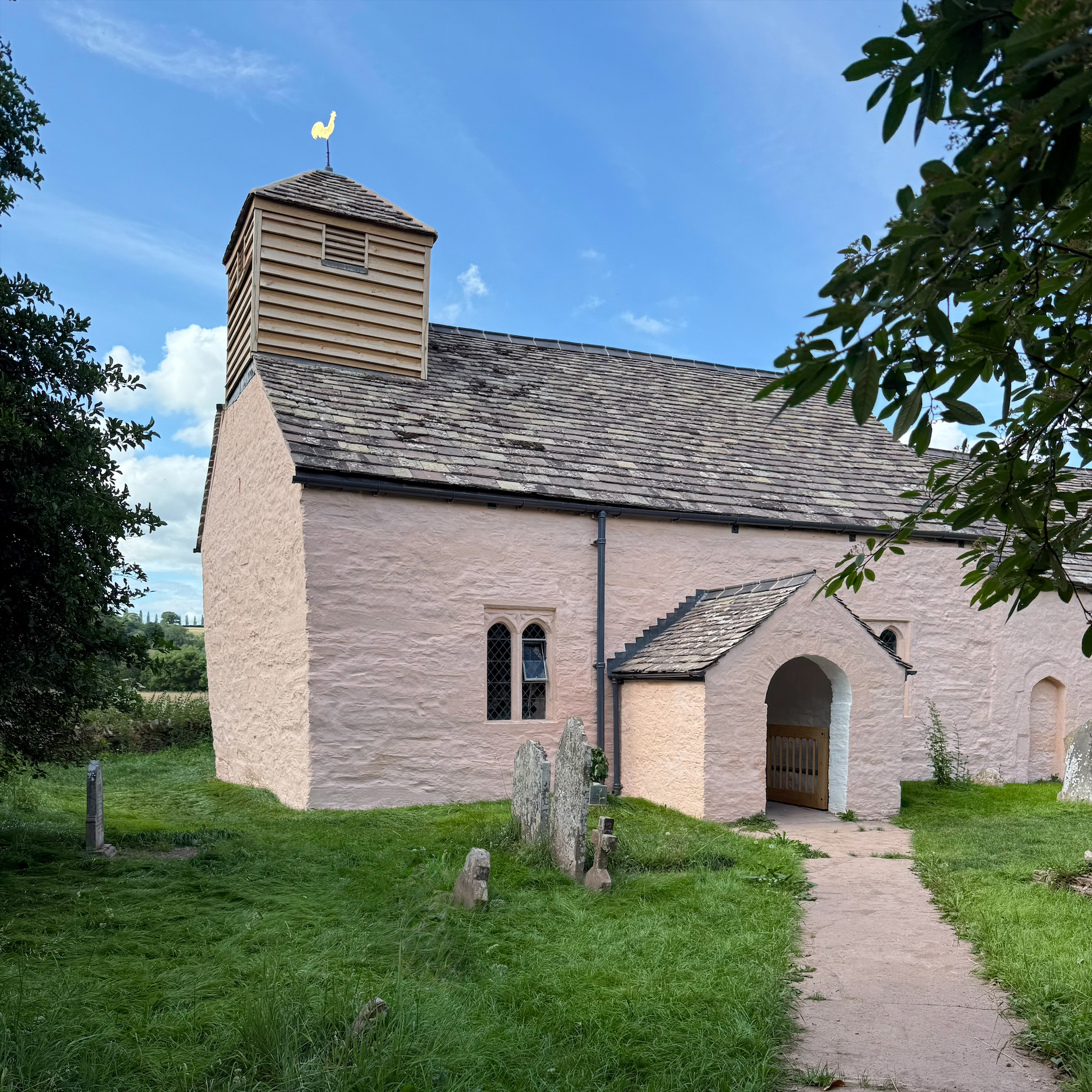

- Location in Monmouthshire
- Location: Llangua, Monmouthshire
- Country: Wales
- Denomination: Church of England

History
- Status: parish church
- Founded: C15th century

Architecture
- Functional status: Active
- Heritage designation: Grade II*
- Designated: 9 January 1956
- Architectural type: Church

Administration
- Diocese: Hereford
- Deanery: Ewyas Harold
- Parish: Llangua

The Church of St James is a former parish church at Llangua in the north-east of Monmouthshire. Although in Wales, the church is in the Church of England rather than the Church in Wales, being part of the parish of Kentchurch in the Diocese of Hereford. It is a Grade II* listed building and is owned and maintained by the Friends of Friendless Churches.

== History ==
The church's original dedication was to St Kew, a Cornish saint believed to have been born in Llangua. The name suggests a pre-Norman foundation whilst the present church dates from the 14th century, with restorations in 1889 and 1954–1955. In 1886 the living of Llangua was merged by order in council with that of Kentchurch across the Wales–England border in Herefordshire. Under the Welsh Church Act 1914, border parishes could decide whether to be part of the Church of England or the Church in Wales, and "Kentchurch with Langan" [sic] voted for England.

The 20th century restorations were funded by Ivor Bulmer-Thomas, former chairman of the Redundant Churches Fund, in memory of his wife. He led the project in 1954–55, with the repairs carried out by E A Roiser. Bulmer-Thomas restored the church as a memorial for his late wife, Dilys Thomas, with a plaque dedicated to her placed at the church's entrance. After the restoration was complete he founded the Friends of Friendless Churches (FoFC) organisation in 1957 to "secure the preservation of churches and chapels, or of any part thereof, in the United Kingdom, whether belonging to or formerly used by the Church of England or by any other religious body … for public access and the benefit of the nation", marking St James's as a pivotal building in the history of church conservation and repair in England and Wales.

Continuing his legacy, the Friends of Friendless Churches completed a substantial restoration of St James's Church in 2024–25, which included extensive repair of the wagon roofs, lime plastering, rendering and limewashing.

== Architecture and description ==
The church is built of Old Red Sandstone. The tower has a wooden Pyramid cap.The earliest parts of the church are 12th century, including the tub font, though most of the structure dates from the 14th and 15th centuries. The two wagon roofs over the chancel and nave are from this period. New windows and a vestry were added by Thomas Nicholson of Hereford in 1889. Much of the interior was remodeled during the 20th century renovations, and includes a painted partition with four panels which is said to have come from a demolished chapel in Whitford, Devon.

Friends of Friendless Churches began major repairs to the church in April of 2024, focusing largely on the roof. The church has a wagon roof with plaster panels with moulded ribs, characteristic of south-east Wales. The weight of the heavy stone roof had caused some trusses to break which had moved the wall-plates out of place and caused the roof to sag. All 29 trusses and the wall-plates have been repaired with traditional techniques when possible, and reinforced with steel plates to successfully carry the weight of the reinstated stone-tiled roof covering. The stone mullions to the windows were repairs and glazing repairs to the windows were completed. The repairs also included raking out old cement pointing and repointing the interior and exterior with lime mortar. The interior was kept an off-white whilst the exterior was limewashed in a pale pink to reflect the colouring of the local clay-soil. The repairs were completed and the church reopened to visitors in June 2025.

== Gallery ==
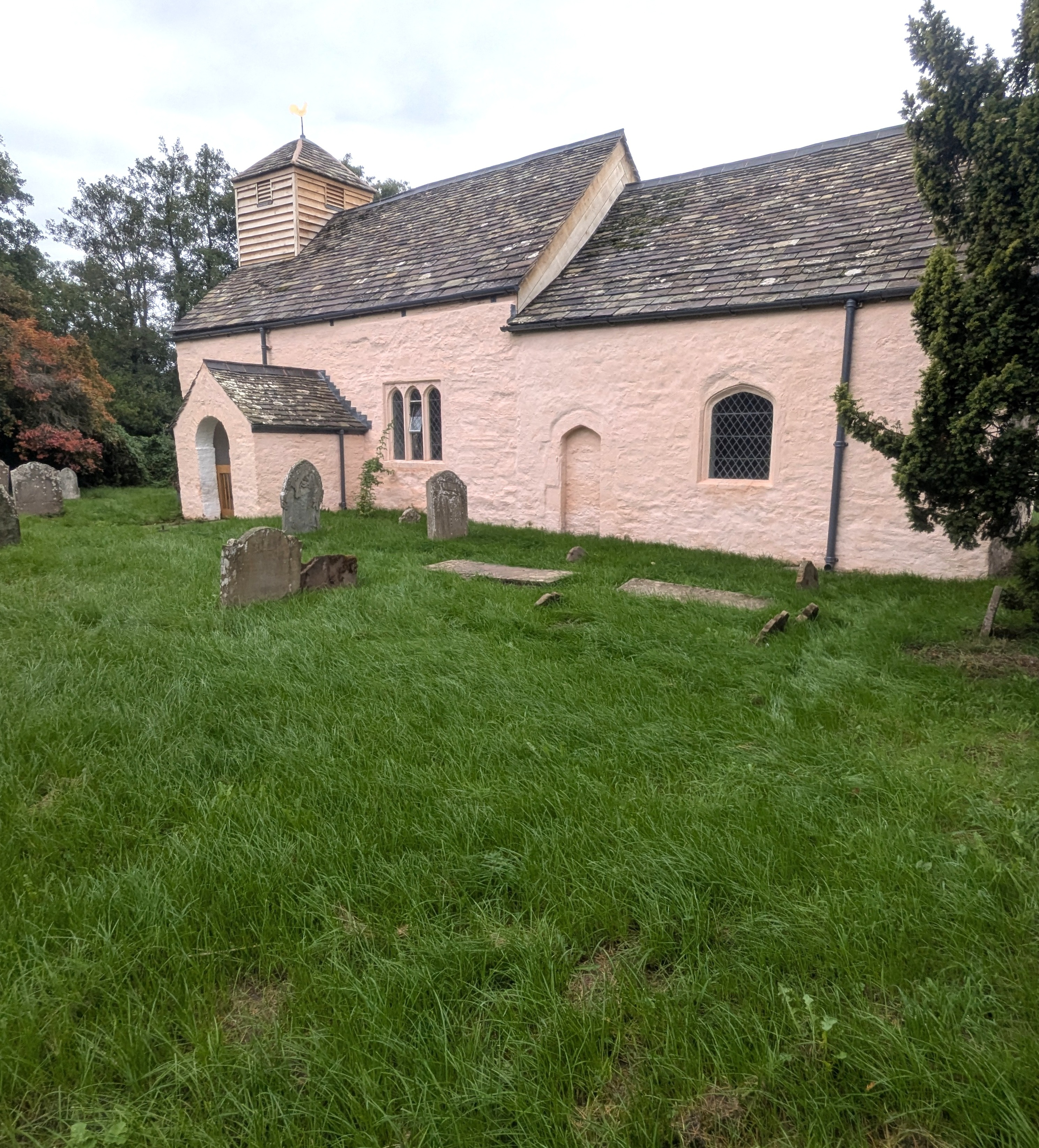
South side after completion of conservation works in 2025

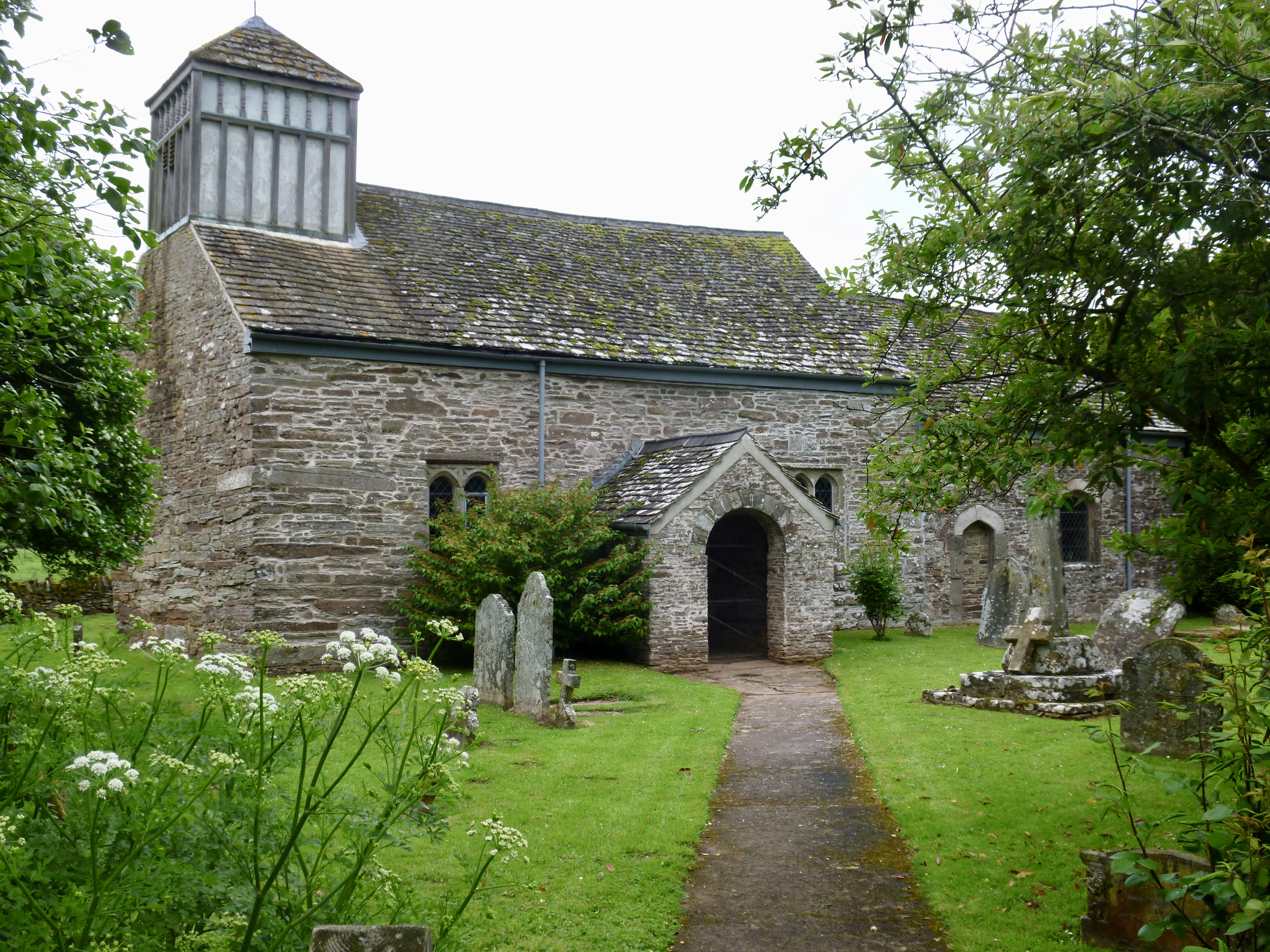
Exterior before renovation

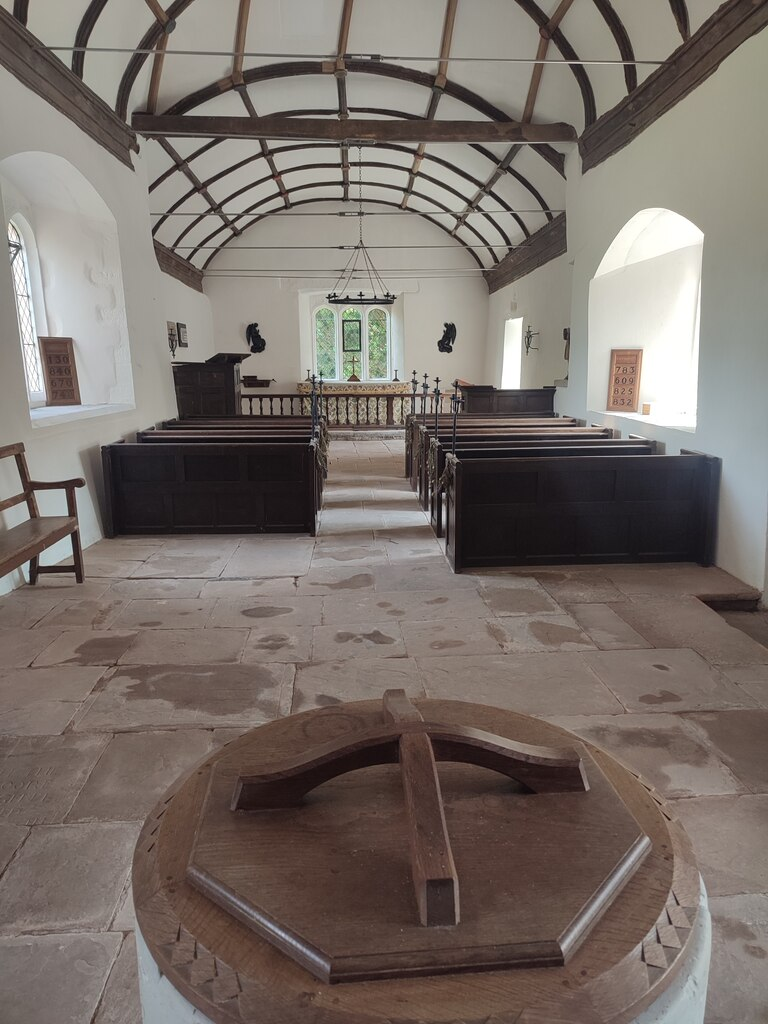
Nave and chancel after completion of conservation works in 2025

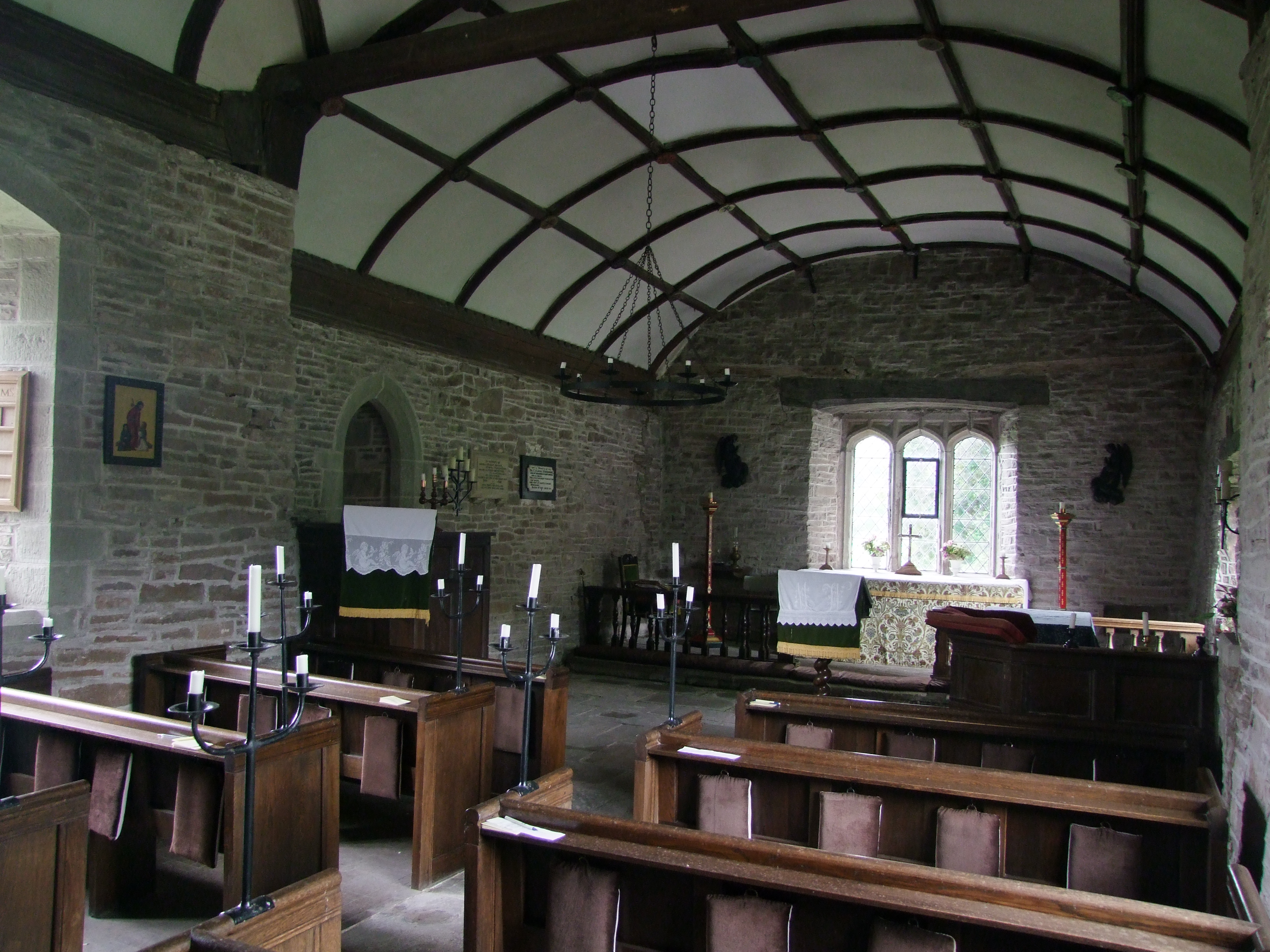
Nave and chancel before conservation

== Sources ==
- Newman, John (2000). Gwent/Monmouthshire. The Buildings of Wales. London: Penguin. ISBN 0-14-071053-1.
