= Ancient Monuments Society =

British charity

The Ancient Monuments Society (AMS) is a learned society and registered charity in England and Wales, founded in 1924 "for the study and conservation of ancient monuments, historic buildings and fine old craftsmanship". Since October 2021, the organisation's working name has been Historic Buildings & Places (HB&P).

== Role ==
The Ancient Monuments Society is recognised as one of the National Amenity Societies, and as such is informed of any application for listed building consent in England and Wales involving any element of demolition. Details of this arrangement are laid out from time to time by the relevant Secretary of State, most recently by the Ministry of Housing, Communities & Local Government in 2021.

== Branding ==
In 2021, the trustees of the society decided to adopt "Historic Buildings & Places" as the working name of the organisation, as of 1 October.

== Personnel ==
The society's president is Richard Fletcher-Vane, 2nd Baron Inglewood, and the chairman of the trustees is the architect Giles Quarme. The director from February 2023 is Liz Power, who was previously the director of the London Museum of Water & Steam.

== Publications ==
The society publishes an annual scholarly journal, containing articles on a range of topics relating to architectural history. From 1953 to 2021, 65 volumes were published under the title Transactions of the Ancient Monuments Society. Following the society's rebranding in 2021, the journal was relaunched in 2022 as the Journal of Historic Buildings and Places, and a new sequence of volume numbering begun.

The society also publishes a more general newsletter, which appears three times a year. Until 2021, this was published jointly with the Friends of Friendless Churches, and included news relating to both organisations. From 2022, following the dissolution of the partnership with the Friends, it was relaunched in a full-colour A4 format as Heritage Now: The Magazine of Historic Buildings and Places. As well as news relating directly to the society the magazine includes general articles relating to architectural history and heritage, and a selective review of recent casework that has been considered by the organisation in its role as a National Amenity Society.

== Partnership with Friends of Friendless Churches ==
From 1993 to 2021, the Ancient Monuments Society worked in partnership with the Friends of Friendless Churches, sharing an office and staff and operating a joint membership scheme, while retaining separate finances and governing bodies. The co-operation came about because Friends of Friendless Churches was set up by Ivor Bulmer-Thomas, who was also Secretary and later Chairman of the Ancient Monuments Society. The arrangement was amicably dissolved at the request of the Friends, effective 27 September 2021.
