= St David's Church, Llangeview =

Coordinates: 51.7017°N 2.8742°W

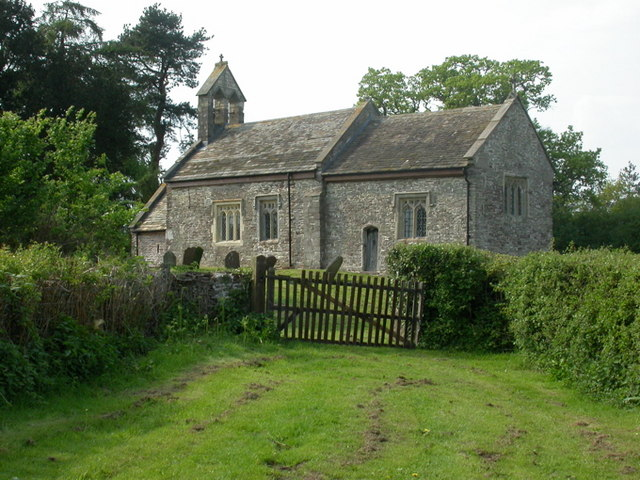
- St David's Church, Llangeview, from the southeast

- Location in Monmouthshire
- OS grid reference: NZ 274 513
- Location: Llangeview, Monmouthshire
- Country: Wales
- Denomination: Church in Wales
- Website: Friends of Friendless Churches

History
- Dedication: Saint David

Architecture
- Functional status: Redundant
- Heritage designation: Grade I
- Designated: 18 November 1980
- Architectural type: Church
- Style: Gothic
- Closed: 1999

Specifications
- Materials: Stone, stone tile roofs

St David's Church, Llangeview, is a redundant church sited in a round churchyard adjacent to the junction of the A449 and A472 roads 1 mile (1.6 km) to the east of the town of Usk in Monmouthshire, Wales. It has been designated by Cadw as a Grade I listed building, and is under the care of the Friends of Friendless Churches. It is Grade I listed because of its "exceptional interior" including a 15th-century rood-loft and "rare pre-Victorian box pews and fittings". The church stands in a churchyard that is almost circular, and is surrounded by a bank and the traces of a ditch.

== History ==
The first record of a church on the site is in 1254. The present church dates mainly from the 15th century and it was probably originally dedicated to Saint Cyfyw. The Monmouthshire author and artist, Fred Hando, records this dedication in his Journeys in Gwent, published in 1951. It was declared redundant in 1999. The charity the Friends of Friendless Churches holds a 999-year lease with effect from 19 November 1999. Since then repairs have been carried out to the exterior.

== Architecture ==
St David's is constructed in stone rubble and has stone tile roofs. Its plan consists of a nave and chancel, with a west porch. On the east gable is a cross finial, and on the west gable is a bellcote. The bellcote has two triangular openings; the bells were dated 1598 and 1688, but only one of these was still present by 1999. On the south side of the church are three windows in Perpendicular style; there are no windows on the north side. The east window has three lights. At the east end of the nave on each side is a buttress, and there is a Tudor arched door on the south wall of the chancel.

The church has a "remarkable unrestored interior with 18th-century fittings". Its floor slopes downwards from the west. The walls are plastered and whitewashed; the pointed chancel arch is also plastered. The frame and the front of the loft of the original 15th-century rood screen are still present. The architectural historian John Newman records this as an "important medieval survival". There is a set of pre-Victorian box pews. These include a large squire's pew, above which is a monument to William Jones who died in 1829. The pulpit is five-sided, and the communion rail is supported by turned balusters. There are stone benches along the east wall and a small, damaged piscina in the south wall. The font is square on a square base. On the floor of the nave and the chancel, and on the north wall, are memorial slabs.

== Sources ==
- Hando, Fred (1951). Journeys in Gwent. Newport: R. H. Johns Ltd. OCLC 30202753.
- Newman, John (2000). Gwent/Monmouthshire. The Buildings of Wales. London: Penguin. ISBN 0-14-071053-1.
