= Hodgeston =

Village and parish in Pembrokeshire, Wales

Coordinates: 51.6575°N 4.85°W

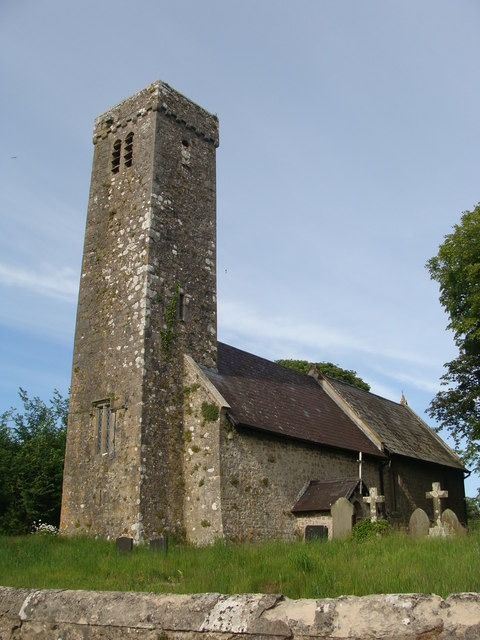
- Hodgeston parish church

- Location within Pembrokeshire
- OS grid reference: SS029993
- Community: Lamphey
- Principal area: Pembrokeshire
- Country: Wales
- Sovereign state: United Kingdom
- Post town: Pembroke
- Postcode district: SA71
- Police: Dyfed-Powys
- Fire: Mid and West Wales
- Ambulance: Welsh

Hodgeston is a small village and parish a mile southeast of Lamphey, south Pembrokeshire, Wales, and is in the community of Lamphey. It is on the A4139 Pembroke Dock to Tenby road. Other surrounding villages are Freshwater East, Jameston and Manorbier Newton.

== History ==
The name Hodgeston is a modern derivation of "Hogges Manor" or similar origin. The name was recorded in 1291 as Villa Hogges.

Hodgeston parish, 709 acres (287 ha), was in the Hundred of Castlemartin from the 14th century. In 1833 the population of the parish was 72.

Hodgeston Hall, dating from about 1800, may have originally served as a rectory, but subsequently became a farmhouse. It is a Grade II listed building.

Parish registers, 1755–1995, are held by Pembrokeshire County Council.

== Transport ==
The Pembroke and Tenby railway, opened in 1863, passes through the north of the parish. The nearest railway station is at Lamphey.

The A4139 road from Pembroke Dock to Tenby runs through the village.

== Church ==
The parish church, parts of which date from the 13th century, has no recorded dedication and is under the care of Friends of Friendless Churches, who acquired a 999-year lease in 2000.

== Notable people ==
- Thomas Young (1507–1568), born at Hodgeston, a Bishop of St David's and Archbishop of York (1561–1568).
