= Llangua =

Village in Monmouthshire, Wales

Coordinates: 51.92918°N 2.88564°W

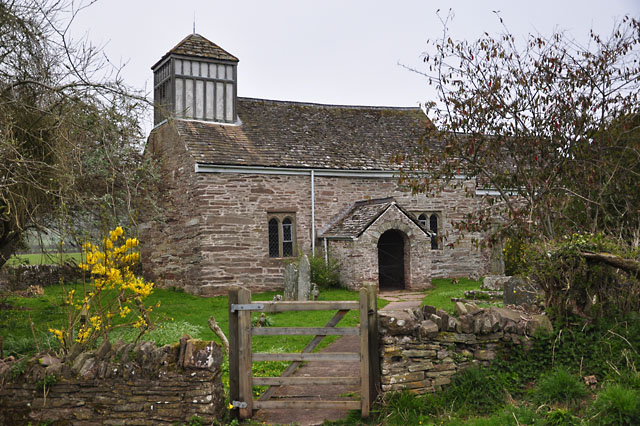
St James's Church, Llangua

Llangua (Welsh: Llangiwa) is a small village in Grosmont community, Monmouthshire, south-east Wales, United Kingdom. Saint Ciwa is said to have built a church there in the 7th century.

== Location ==
Llangua is located nine miles north-east of Abergavenny on the A465 road.

== History & Amenities ==
Llangua sits just inside the border with England on the Welsh bank of the River Monnow. The village has a parish church. Grosmont is one mile to the southeast.
