= Decuman =

8th-century Christian saint

Saint Decuman
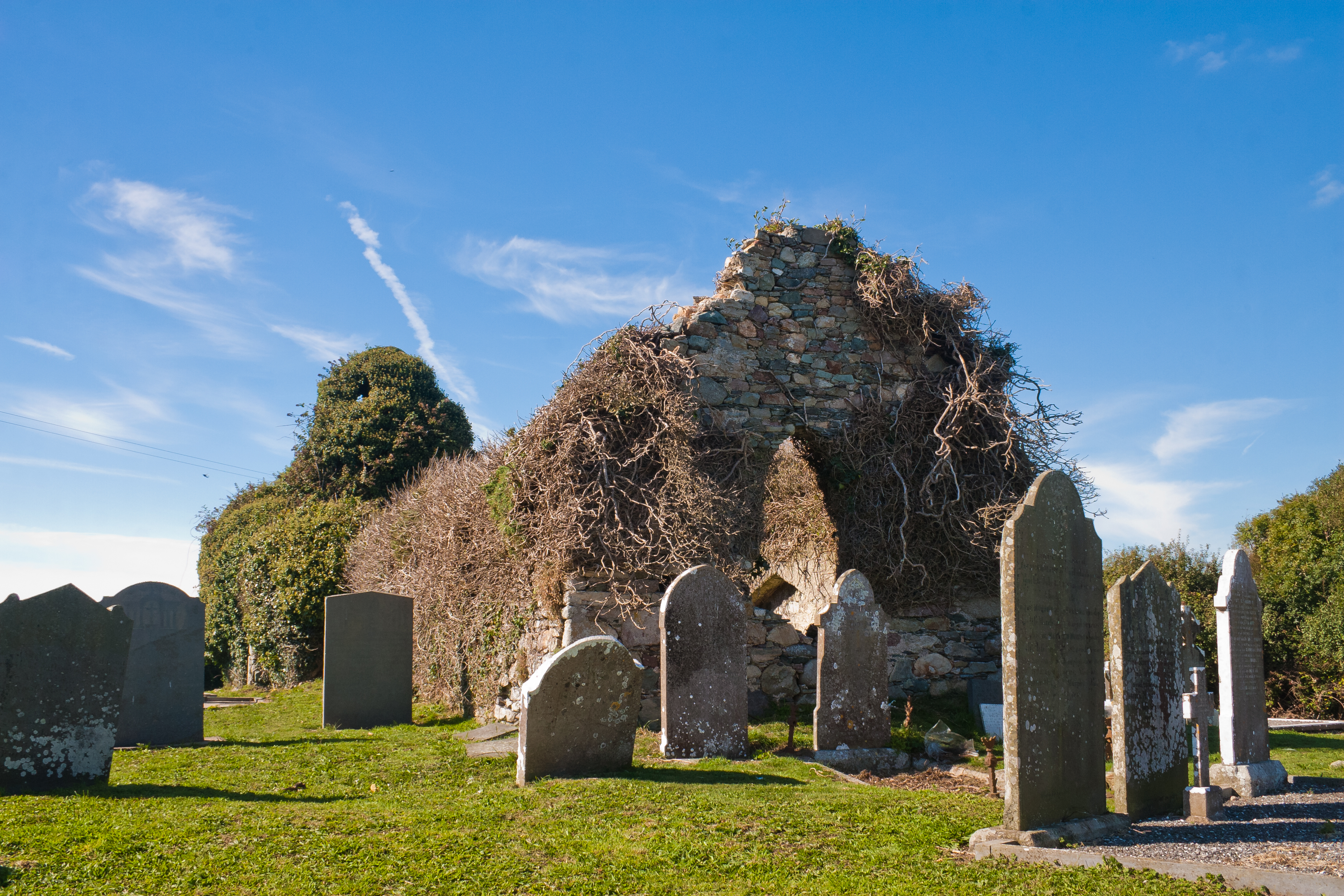
- St Degumen's Church in Killag, Ireland
- Born: 7th century Rhoscrowther, Pembrokeshire, Wales
- Died: c. 706
- Major shrine: Watchet, Somerset
- Feast: 27 February, 27 August

Decuman (Medieval Latin: Decumanus; Welsh: Degyman; died c. 706) was one of the Celtic saints who came to Somerset from Pembrokeshire, South Wales, in the seventh century, arriving on a raft (or his cloak) with a cow for a companion. There he was a pastor and physician to the local inhabitants.

== Life and cult ==
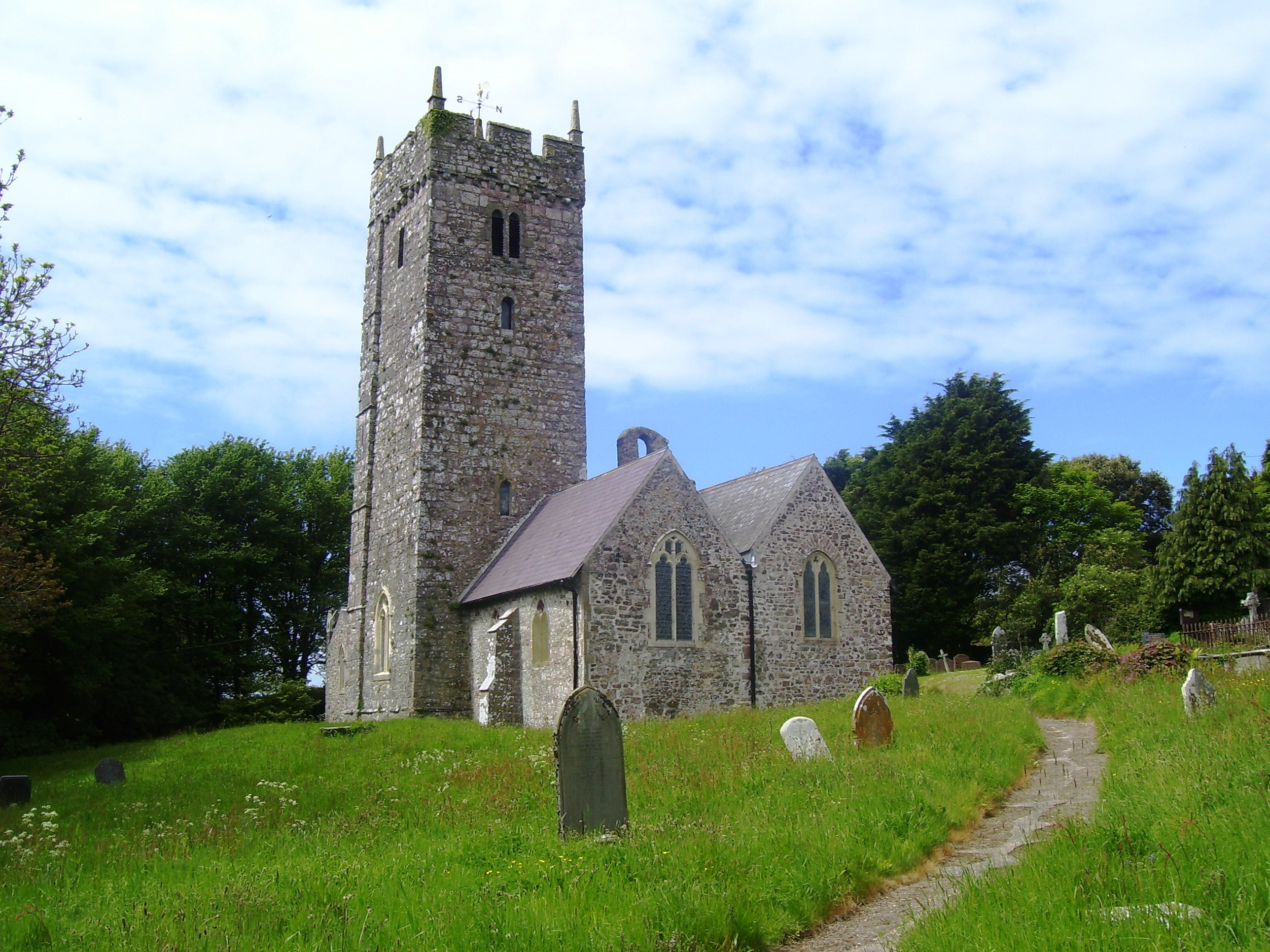
St Decuman's, Rhoscrowther, Wales

Decuman is said to have been born of noble parents at Rhoscrowther in Pembrokeshire, Wales, where the church is dedicated to him. His name comes from the Latin for a farmer of tithes, which is a smallholder who paid a rent for his farm.

Decuman had a chapel at nearby Pwllcrochan. Wishing to escape from worldly companions he crossed the Bristol Channel and landed at Dunster: he then became a hermit at nearby Watchet, living from the produce of his cow. There he healed the sick and acted as a pastor to the inhabitants.

There Decuman is said to have been killed by a pagan. Legend tells that the holy man's head was cut off by "a certain man more venomous than an asp, more poisonous than the adder...." Beheading is a legend which is found associated with several Celtic saints, but in this variant, the saint miraculously picks up his head, washes it, and replaces it. After this the local people assisted Decuman to build the church (Legends and Folklore of Watchet — Ben Norman).

Decuman's Holy Well is located down the lane from the church at Watchet, in Somerset.

Decuman is said to have died in 706, when Somerset west of the Parrett, including Watchet, was still under Celtic rule. His feast day was celebrated at Somerset on 27 February. The saint is associated with several other places in south Wales and also with Degibna, on Loe Pool, near Helston in Cornwall, where there was a chapel dedicated to him.

== Veneration ==
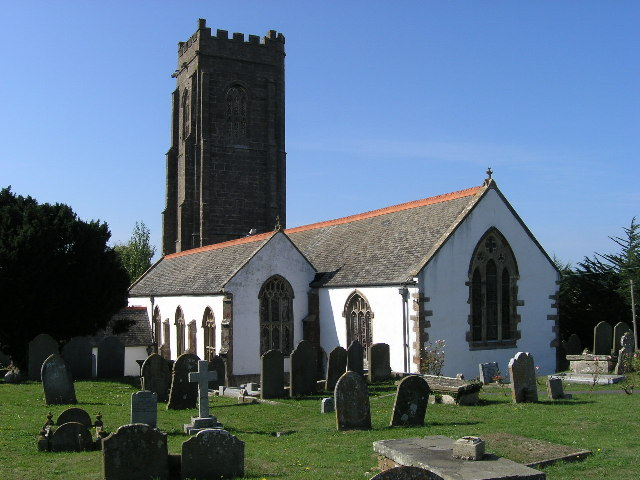
The medieval parish church of Watchet in Somerset is dedicated to St Decuman

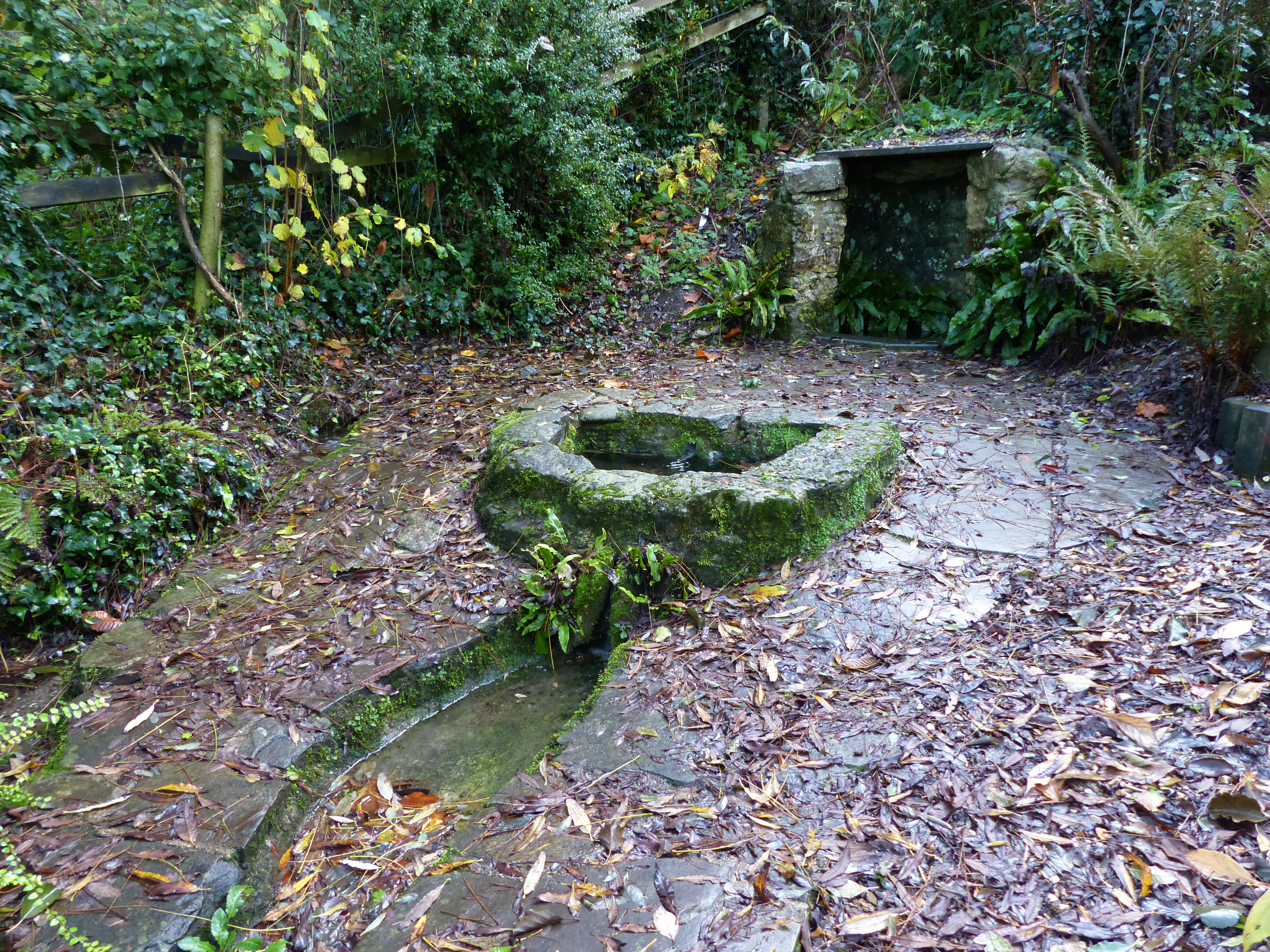
St Decuman's Well

=== Ancient parish ===
St Decuman was a parish in the hundred of Williton and Freemanners. This parish included Watchet, Williton and many hamlets. It was divided into the civil parishes of Watchet and Williton in 1902.

=== Wexford ===
Decuman was under the names of St Degumen or St Tenen also venerated in County Wexford with three churches in the townlands Ballyconnick, Killag, and Killiane Little dedicated to him. All of them are now in ruins.
