= Historic Chapels Trust =

British registeed charity

- Formation: 1993; 33 years ago
- Type: Registered Charity
- Purpose: Save and protect non-Anglican places of worship no longer used by their congregations
- Website: www.historicchapelstrust.org

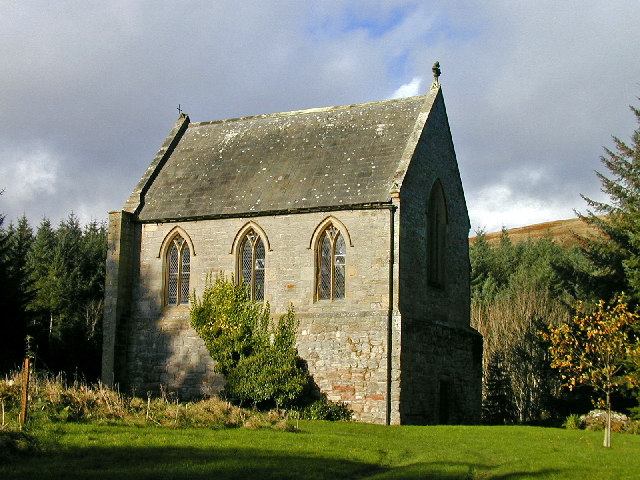
Biddlestone Chapel in Northumberland

The Historic Chapels Trust was a British Registered Charity set up to care for redundant non-Anglican churches, chapels, and places of worship in England. Its holdings encompassed various nonconformist Christian denominations and Roman Catholic sites.

== Foundation ==
Established in 1993, the Trust took into ownership buildings of exceptional architectural and historic significance that are no longer used by their congregations, in practice buildings listed Grade I or II* by English Heritage. It was founded in response to the large number of places of worship that were being demolished or destroyed by insensitive conversion and it was the only body with this mission in England.

== Activities ==
Once acquired, the buildings were repaired and restored, and then available for new, mostly secular, community uses. The places of worship can be of any denomination or faith, other than the Anglican Church. They included Nonconformist chapels of the Methodist, Unitarian, Baptist, Lutheran denominations, two Congregationalist chapels, two Quaker meeting houses and four Roman Catholic churches. The Trust has the power to take synagogues and non-Christian places of worship but in spite of negotiations has not yet done so. The Trust arranged for the chapels to be open to the public at advertised times, and wherever possible it introduces disabled access. The Trust encouraged the use of the buildings for services of worship.

At about half of its sites the Trust formed a volunteer local committee to organise events, arrange occasional services of worship. Elsewhere it engaged volunteers as key-holders and to assist with the maintenance of sites. In 2012 the Trust declared a moratorium on rescuing new sites unless they are donated together with endowment funds, and in 2025 a policy of dispersal of its collection of buildings was commenced, due to the removal of English Heritage grant support.

Directors of the Trust were Dr.Jenny Freeman 1993 – 2011, who was awarded an OBE for her services to heritage. Roland Jeffery held the post of Director 2013–2018.

== Finances & Viability ==
Historic Chapels Trust lacked an endowment and received no direct government grant. It depended from the start on grants from English Heritage, later Historic England and the Heritage Lottery Fund, money earned by events at the buildings, support from trusts and foundations, and donations from individuals and Patrons. This is in contrast with the larger Churches Conservation Trust, which received 70 percent of its funding from the Department for Culture, Media and Sport, and the balance from the Church Commissioners of the Church of England. However it can only take into care Anglican buildings. In 2016 Historic England announced that its financial support for Historic Chapels Trust would be wound down to zero, causing the Trustees to fundamentally review the viability of the charity. In 2021 dispersal of the collection was initiated. By 2026 eighteen chapels had been transferred to other owners, mostly non-profit bodies, and two were sold into private ownership. The process of winding up the charity was initiated in 2026.

The Trust operated only in England and was led by a board of Trustees. Since 2015 the President of the Trust is the Rt Hon Lord Beith.

== Rescued places of worship ==
In spite of its meagre resources the Trust rescued 20 properties., some from a semi-derelict state, such as the Dissenters' Chapel in Kensal Green Cemetery, and Salem Chapel in East Budleigh, Devon. Some chapels are in remote locations, such as Biddlestone Chapel in Northumberland, Farfield Friends Meeting House in West Yorkshire, and Penrose Methodist Chapel in Cornwall. Others are in urban areas, such as Wallasey Memorial Unitarian Church in Merseyside, and St George's German Lutheran Church in London. Some of the rescued chapels were small and simple, others large and elaborate buildings, such as the Bethesda Methodist Chapel in Hanley, Staffordshire, Todmorden Unitarian Church in West Yorkshire, Umberslade Baptist Church in the West Midlands, and the Shrine of Our Lady of Lourdes in Blackpool, Lancashire. During the first 13 years of its existence, the Trust won ten architectural awards, including a Europa Nostra Award for the Dissenters' Chapel.

Name	Location	Photograph	Date^{[A]}	Notes	Grade
Farfield Friends Meeting House	Addingham, West Yorkshire; 53.9621°N 1.8855°W	A small, simple chapel seen almost end-on in a grassy burial ground; it is built in stone with a moss-covered roof. On the end is a window with open shutters; on the front face is a door and two shuttered windows.	1689	This is a small, simple Quaker meeting house built immediately after the Act of Toleration, on land previously used as a burial ground. Outside the meeting house are five chest tombs of an unusual type for a Quaker burial ground. Ownership transferred to the Friends of Friendless Churches in 2025	II*
Walpole Old Chapel	Walpole, Suffolk; 52.3232°N 1.4816°E	A white building with a red-tied roof seen from an angle and looking more like a house than a chapel. It has two storeys, a double gable, two windows on the end and on the entrance front are two doors and two windows in each storey.	1689	Built as soon as allowed by the Act of Toleration, the chapel was converted from an existing farmhouse. Initially used by a group of Independent Christians, it later became a Congregational chapel. In the 1860s, it was taken over by the Primitive Methodists.	II*
Cote Baptist Chapel	Bampton, Oxfordshire; 51.7255°N 1.4930°W	A grey-white building seen almost end-on with two storeys. The lower storey has two doors with a round-headed window between, the upper storey has three round-headed windows, and at the top is a truncated gable.	1703–04	The chapel was built for a group of Baptists originating on the other side of the River Thames. It was enlarged in the 1750s, and in the late 1850s underwent an extensive restoration. Following another restoration in the 1990s, it is now used for weddings, concerts, and other events. Ownership transferred to the Friends of Friendless Churches in 2025	II*
Salem Chapel	East Budleigh, Devon; 50.6577°N 3.3167°W	Two single-storey cream buildings with slate roofs at an angle to each other. On the left is part of the chapel; on the right is the assembly hall with two sash windows. In front is a brick wall and gateposts; above the gate is an overthrow with a lantern.	1719	Initially a Presbyterian chapel, it was later used by Congregationalists, and then by the Assemblies of God. Adjacent to it is a separate assembly room. It is now used for concerts and other events, weddings, and the occasional church service.	II*
Coanwood Friends Meeting House	Haltwhistle, Northumberland; 54.9243°N 2.4541°W	A small, stone, single-storey building with a slate roof in a burial ground with gravestones. Seen from the front, it has steps leading up to a door and three windows.	1720	This meeting house stands in an isolated position and is unchanged since it was built, other than the replacement of its thatched roof with slates. The interior retains its original layout, with rows of benches for the congregation and elders still in place. In the burial ground are typical Quaker gravestones, some of which commemorate the Wigham family, who helped to found the meeting house. Ownership transferred to the Friends of Friendless Churches in 2025	II*
Grittleton Strict Baptist Chapel	Grittleton, Wiltshire; 51.5193°N 2.2006°W	—	c. 1720	The chapel opened in 1721. It has a rectangular plan with a tiled roof. Inside there are galleries at each end. Under the north gallery is a vestry, in front of which is a pulpit with a staircase and preacher's seat. In the body of the chapel are box pews and a child's pew. In 2025 the chapel and burial ground was sold to the owners of adjoining Grittleton House to manage as part of their event venue offer.	II*
St George's German Lutheran Church	Alie Street, London; 51.5142°N 0.0705°W	The end of a symmetrical brick building in two storeys. On the ground floor are two doorways between which is a Venetian-style window; in the upper storey are two round-headed windows with a semicircular inscribed plaque between; over this is a white cross and the building is topped by a gable.	1762–63	St George's was the fifth Lutheran church to be built in London, and continued to be used by Lutherans until 1996. It now contains the offices of the Historic Chapels Trust and is also used for concerts, organ recitals, and other events. The church was transferred in 2025 to the ownership of the Council of Lutheran Churches	II*
St Benet's Chapel	Netherton, Merseyside; 53.4946°N 2.9678°W	A brick house with the chapel extending behind it	1793	Although it was built after the Catholic Relief Acts that allowed Roman Catholics to worship openly, the chapel is concealed behind the presbytery that appears from the road to be a "standard two-bay house". It retains some of its original fittings, and as of 2010 it is being restored as it would have been before the Second Vatican Council. The presbytery is used as a residence for retired priests.In 2026 the Trust's lease was surrendered to the Archdiocese of Liverpool.	II*.
Bethesda Methodist Chapel	Hanley, Stoke-on-Trent, Staffordshire; 53.0233°N 2.1769°W		1819	Once known as the "Cathedral of the Potteries", it was built for the Methodist New Connexion. An elaborate portico was added to its frontage in 1859. During the 20th century its congregation declined and its fabric deteriorated, leading to its closure in 1985. Repairs costing £2.5 million are under way as of 2010. Ownership transferred to Re-Form Heritage 2026	II*
Biddlestone Chapel	Biddlestone, Northumberland; 55.3688°N 2.0720°W	A short, relatively tall chapel, with three arched windows in the near face, and a taller similar window in the face receding to the right	c. 1820	The chapel stands in a remote location and was built as a private chapel for Biddlestone Hall by the Roman Catholic Selby family. The hall has been demolished, but the chapel has been retained. It was built on the remains of a medieval pele tower, incorporating some of its fabric. Ownership transferred to the Friends of Friendless Churches in 2025	II*
Dissenters' Chapel	Kensal Green Cemetery, London; 51.5269°N 0.2159°W	A double track leads through grass towards a small Classical-style building. The central portion has four columns supporting a pediment, and wings with columns extend from each side.	1832	The first purpose-built Nonconformist chapel to be built in a public cemetery, its condition had deteriorated so much that its wings were demolished in the 1970s. Later that decade, the chapel underwent a major restoration, including rebuilding the wings, and restoring the original painting scheme. In 2025 the lease to Historic Chapels Trust was surrendered and the building is now managed by the General Cemetery Company.	II*
Thorndon Park Chapel	Thorndon Park, Essex; 51.5987°N 0.3301°E	The entrance front of a Gothic chapel with a steep gable and a small spire to the right	c. 1850	This was built as the private Roman Catholic chantry chapel and mausoleum for the Petre family in the grounds of Thorndon Hall. It was designed by William Wardell, and is in Decorated style. The interior has an elaborately decorated roof, including depictions of angels, and a richly carved reredos.	II*
Wainsgate Baptist Church	Hebden Bridge, West Yorkshire; 53.7555°N 2.0041°W	A two-storey gabled stone building seen from an angle with another building attached behind it. There are round-headed windows and a door in the nearer building with straight-headed windows in the building behind it.	1859–60	The chapel stands in an elevated position overlooking Hebden Bridge. Attached to the rear of the chapel is the former manse, converted into a school in 1890. The chapel closed in 2001, and is now a venue for concerts and other events.	II*
Todmorden Unitarian Church	Todmorden, West Yorkshire; 53.7111°N 2.0990°W	A Gothic style church dominated by a large, elaborate tower with a spire and pinnacles.	1865–69	The church was built by the Fielden family, local mill owners, and it is constructed using the best quality materials. It was designed by John Gibson in Gothic style with a large spire 196 feet (60 m) high. Following a £1 million programme of repairs, which included restoration of the surrounding landscape and burial ground, it is now used for occasional services, weddings and other events.	I
Westgate Methodist Chapel	Bishop Auckland, County Durham; 54.7372°N 2.1482°W		1871	Built for the Primitive Methodists, the chapel closed in 2007. It retains its Victorian layout, complete with the original pews, gallery, windows, a "magnificent organ", and much detailed decoration.In 2026 it was transferred at nil value to charity Trades4Care	II*.
Umberslade Baptist Church	Hockley Heath, West Midlands; 52.3467°N 1.7859°W	A Gothic style church seen from the south; to the left is a tower with a spire and pinnacles; to the right is a two-storey, gabled transept.	1877	George Ingall designed the church for the Baptist George Frederick Muntz, junior, of Umberslade Hall. It is constructed in blue lias stone in Decorated style with a spire, and has much elaborate detail. Repairs costing about £500,000 were completed in 2008.	II
Penrose Methodist Chapel	St Ervan, Cornwall; 50.4980°N 4.9971°W	—	1861	The chapel's plan is a simple rectangle with a single storey. Its interior retains its original layout, with box pews, and benches in the area once occupied by the musicians and choir. In 2026 after negotiations with a Cornish charity broke down, the trustees offered the chapel for sale on the open market.	II*
Longworth Roman Catholic Chapel	Bartestree, Herefordshire; 52.0620°N 2.6308°W	—	1869–70	Originally the medieval chapel to the manor house at Old Longworth, it was used for agricultural purposes after the Reformation. The chapel was restored in 1851, then moved to a site adjacent to convent at Bartestree in 1869–70. It is probable that the move and rebuilding were supervised by In 2026 it was transferred to the Longworth Chapel Bartestree charity. E. W. Pugin.	II*.
Wallasey Memorial Unitarian Church	Wallasey, Merseyside; 53.4216°N 3.0410°W	—	1899	Designed by Edmund Waring and Edmund Rathbone in Arts and Crafts style, the church is constructed in brick with stone dressings. Many of the internal fittings were designed by Art Nouveau craftsmen from the Bromsgrove Guild. The hall is in use for dance classes and the church for concerts and meetings.	II*
Shrine of Our Lady of Lourdes	Blackpool, Lancashire; 53.8229°N 3.0165°W	A grey-white stone chapel seen from the northwest, with a central spirelet with a cross. There is an elaborate carving of the Crucifixion over the west door, a tall pinnacle at the corner, and elaborate stone tracery in the windows along the side	1955–57	The shrine was built as a thanksgiving for the relatively small amount of damage sustained by the Roman Catholic Diocese of Lancaster during the Second World War. It was designed by Francis Xavier Velarde and is constructed in Portland stone with copper cladding to its roof and flèche.	II*

=== Key ===
Grade	Criteria
I	Buildings of exceptional interest, sometimes considered to be internationally important
II*	Particularly important buildings of more than special interest
II	Buildings of national importance and special interest

== See also ==
- Churches Conservation Trust, the equivalent body for redundant Anglican churches
- Friends of Friendless Churches, a non-denominational charity, which rescues and repairs redundant places of worship in England and Wales

== Notes ==
^{A} This is the date of first construction of the existing building.
