= Dissenters' Chapel =

Dissenter's Chapel can mean:

- In the United Kingdom, a non-Anglican chapel, addressed by the Dissenters' Chapels Act 1844
- the best known of which is the Dissenters' Chapel, Kensal Green
