= St Boniface's German Church, Whitechapel =

Church of St Boniface
- German Roman Catholic Church of St Boniface
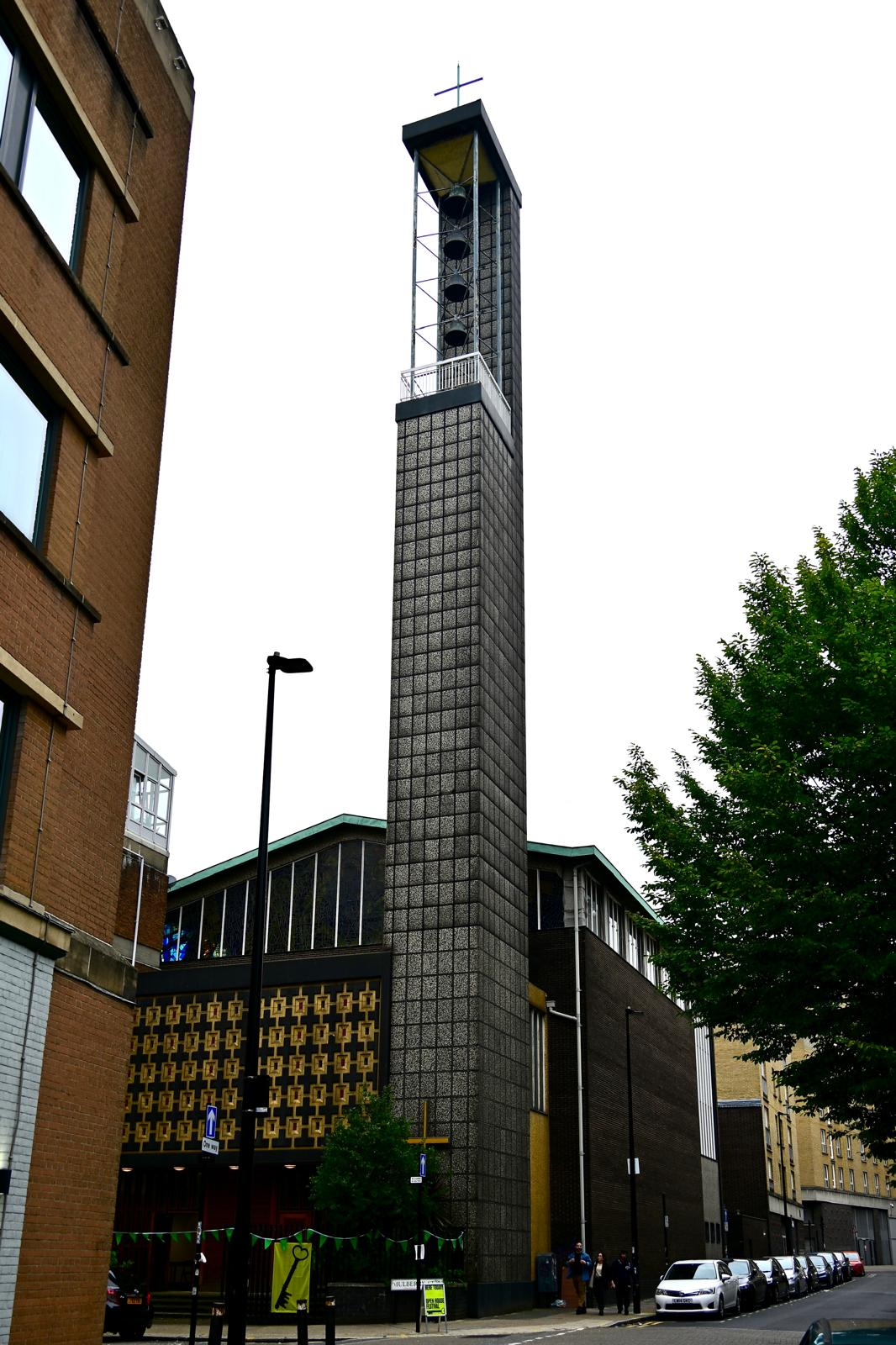
- Church of St Boniface
- 51.515860°N 0.067286°W
- OS grid reference: TQ 34201 81430
- Location: 47 Adler Street, Whitechapel, London, England
- Country: England
- Denomination: Roman Catholic

History
- Status: Active
- Founded: 1809
- Founder: German Catholic Mission
- Dedication: Saint Boniface
- Consecrated: 1960

Architecture
- Functional status: German-speaking chaplaincy in the Diocese of Westminster
- Heritage designation: Grade II listed
- Designated: 4 December 2017
- Architect(s): Donald Plaskett Marshall & Partners; John Young (former building)
- Style: Modernist
- Years built: 1959–1960

Administration
- Province: Westminster
- Diocese: Westminster

The German Church of St Boniface (German: Deutschsprachige Katholische Gemeinde St. Bonifatius London) is a Roman Catholic church located in Whitechapel, in the London Borough of Tower Hamlets. It serves the German-speaking Catholic community of East London and is part of the Diocese of Westminster.

The present Modernist church was built in 1959–60 to replace a 19th-century neo-Romanesque building destroyed in the London Blitz during the Second World War. It is a Grade II listed building.

== History ==
London's German Catholic Mission was founded in East London in 1809 to minister to the substantial German-speaking immigrant community largely employed in the sugar refining industry. It was predated by St George's German Lutheran Church, founded in Whitechapel in 1762.

In 1862 the German Catholic Mission moved to its current site in Adler Street, occupying a former Methodist building. Between 1873 and 1875, a new neo-Romanesque church was built to designs by John Young.Damaged in a Zeppelin raid in 1917, the building was completely destroyed by enemy bombing during the London Blitz in September 1940.

Rebuilding was pursued in earnest from 1952 under the impetus of Father Felix Leushacke. Leushacke engaged architect and friend, Toni Hermanns of Kleve, to work up a model. When Hermanns' radical design was rejected by the Archdiocese, Leushacke turned to Donald Plaskett Marshall of Plaskett Marshall & Partners to provide a new scheme that, after much negotiation, was finally agreed in 1957. Plaskett's assured Modernist design nevertheless references Expressionist architectural trends prevalent in West German post-war ecclesiastical architecture of the period. Construction began in November 1959 and concluded 12 months later ahead of consecration by Cardinal William Godfrey, Archbishop of Westminster, and the Auxiliary Bishop of Cologne, Wilhelm Leven.

== Architecture ==
The church has a rectangular plan oriented with its altar facing south. The north-facing façade features a large abstract screen made up of 65 individual windows in red glass that form a grid of black mosaic crosses on a yellow ground. The frieze is positioned above a glazed timber entrance. A tall and slender bell tower clad in grey mosaic tiles stands to the north-west corner. Its upper stage is cut away on three sides to reveal four bells that were cast at the neighbouring Whitechapel Bell Foundry in 1885 and salvaged from the former church. The shallow-pitched copper roof incorporates clerestory windows on all but the south elevation, forming an inset glazed gable that rises above the north-facing frieze.

Beyond the full-span narthex, the interior consists of a six-bay nave painted predominantly in white, which provides seating for 200, plus an additional 60 in the gallery. The wooden parquet floor contrasts with the white marble floor of the chancel. Dominating the south wall over the high altar is a large sgraffito mural executed by Heribert Reul of Kevelaer in 1960, depicting Christ in Majesty with St Boniface.

The high altar, Lady altar, tabernacle plinth, and triangular baptismal font - all in dark green marble - are also the work of Reul, installed ahead of consecration. The copper tabernacle itself - depicting the symbols of the miracle of the Feeding of the Multitude - was designed by Reul and cast by Paul van Oye, as was the bronze font cover. The altar cross and candlesticks were designed by Wilhelm Polders and also cast by van Oye.

Wrought-iron panels that hang on the south wall below Reul's mural were originally altar rails, designed by Reginald Lloyd - the only non-German artist commissioned to provide fittings for the church. The iron gallery railing depicting the Crucifixion with the Nativity and the Resurrection, and the lectern depicting the Parable of the Sower all form part of the same commission. Lloyd also provided the design for the large and colourful stained glass depiction of Pentecost installed in the north gable.

Spanning the front of organ loft are 14 Stations of the Cross in carved polychrome wood. 11 of them were made by Georg Lang of Oberammergau in 1912 and salvaged from the rubble of the destroyed church. Three post-war replacements that re-complete the set were produced by the successor workshop of Lang Selig Erben in the 1960s.

Romanus Seifert & Sohn built the church organ in 1965, installed in a gallery above the entrance narthex.

Five vivid murals on canvas by Hans Feibusch depicting scenes from the Old Testament hang in the nave, three on the west wall and two to the east. Originally painted for the West London Synagogue in 1973, they have been on long-term loan to St Boniface from the Ben Uri Collection since 2021. Feibusch was a German-Jewish émigré to the UK, where he lived and worked from 1933 until his death in 1998.

== Gallery ==
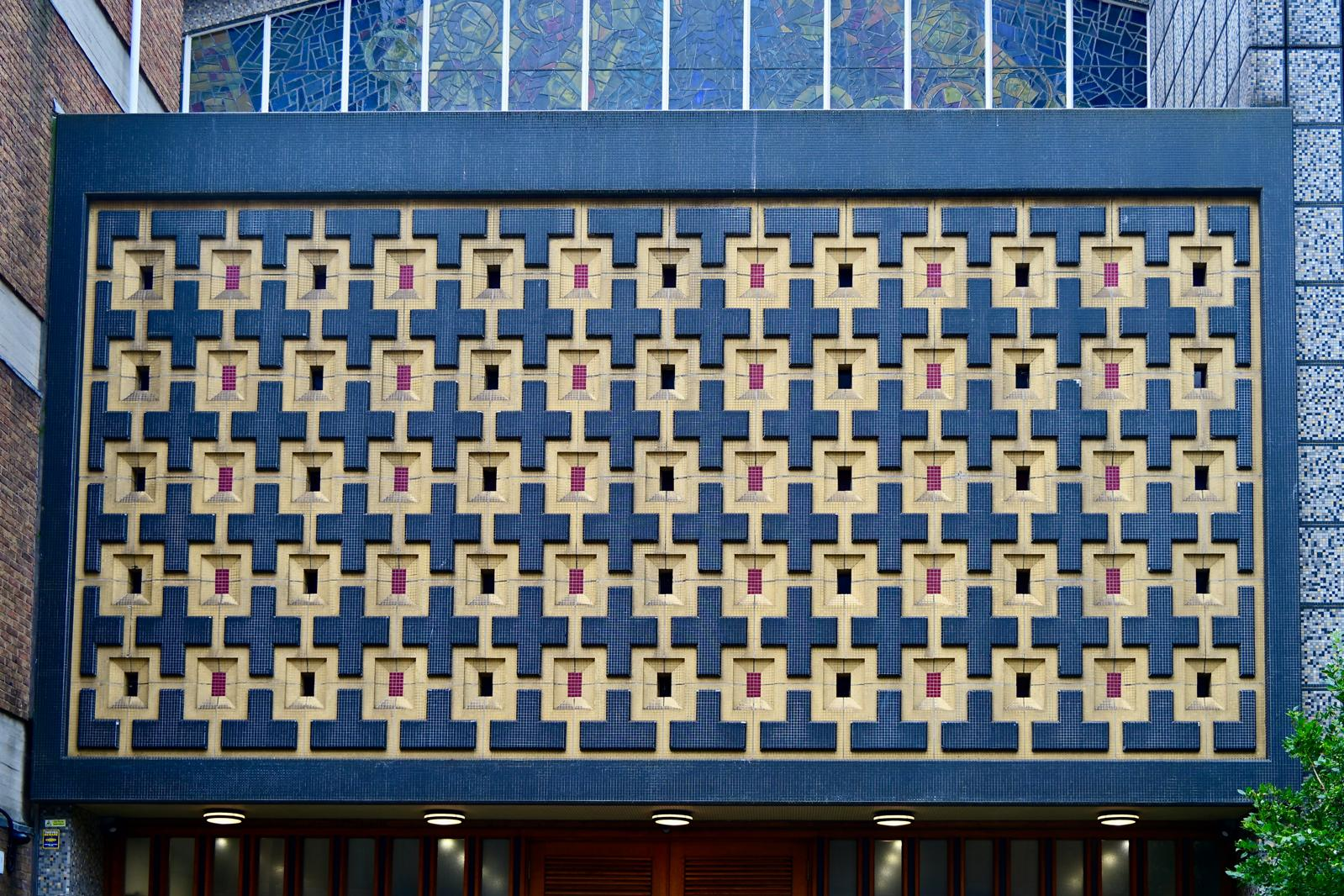
Exterior screen above main north-facing entrance

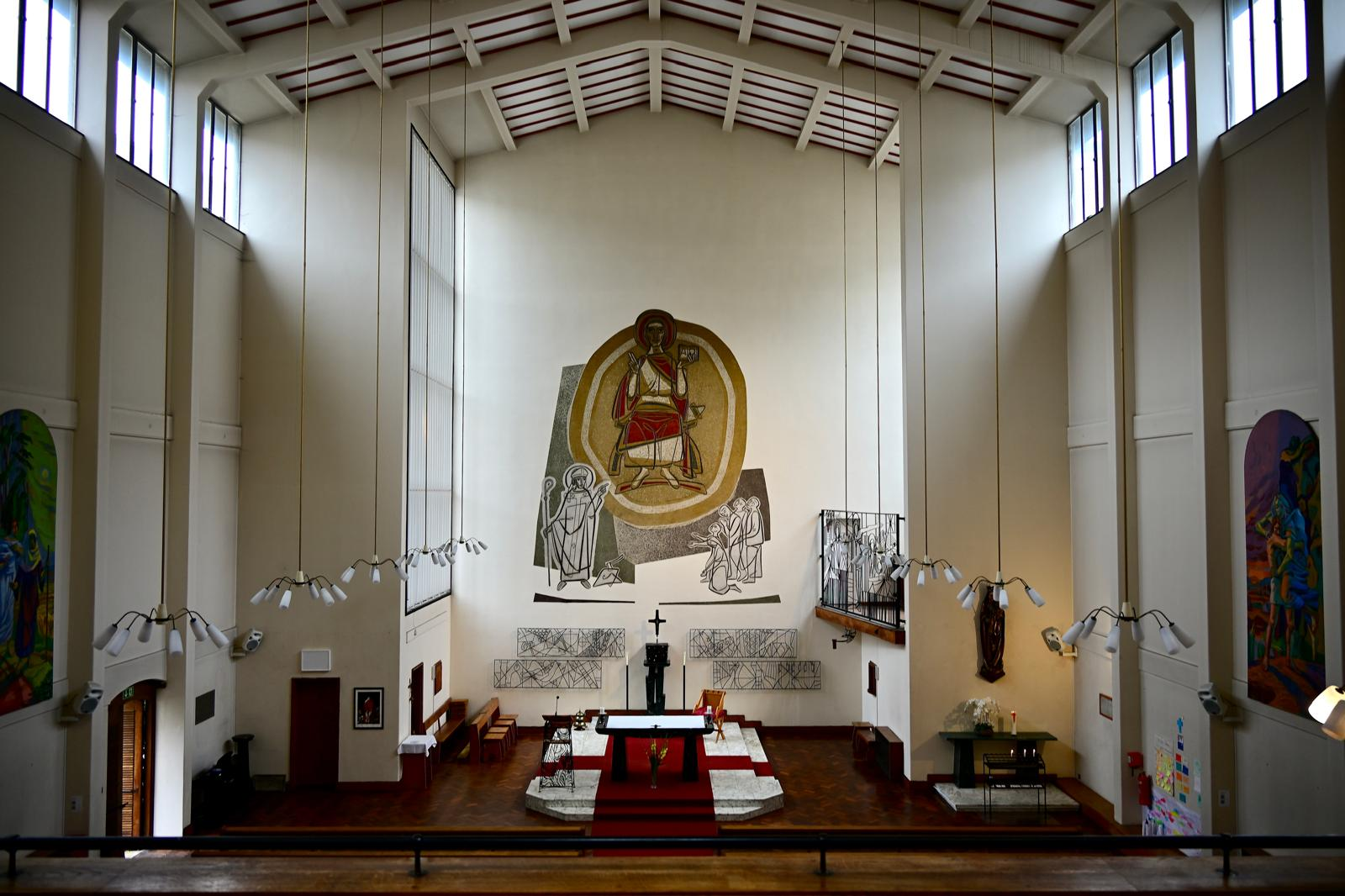
Interior view from organ loft towards chancel

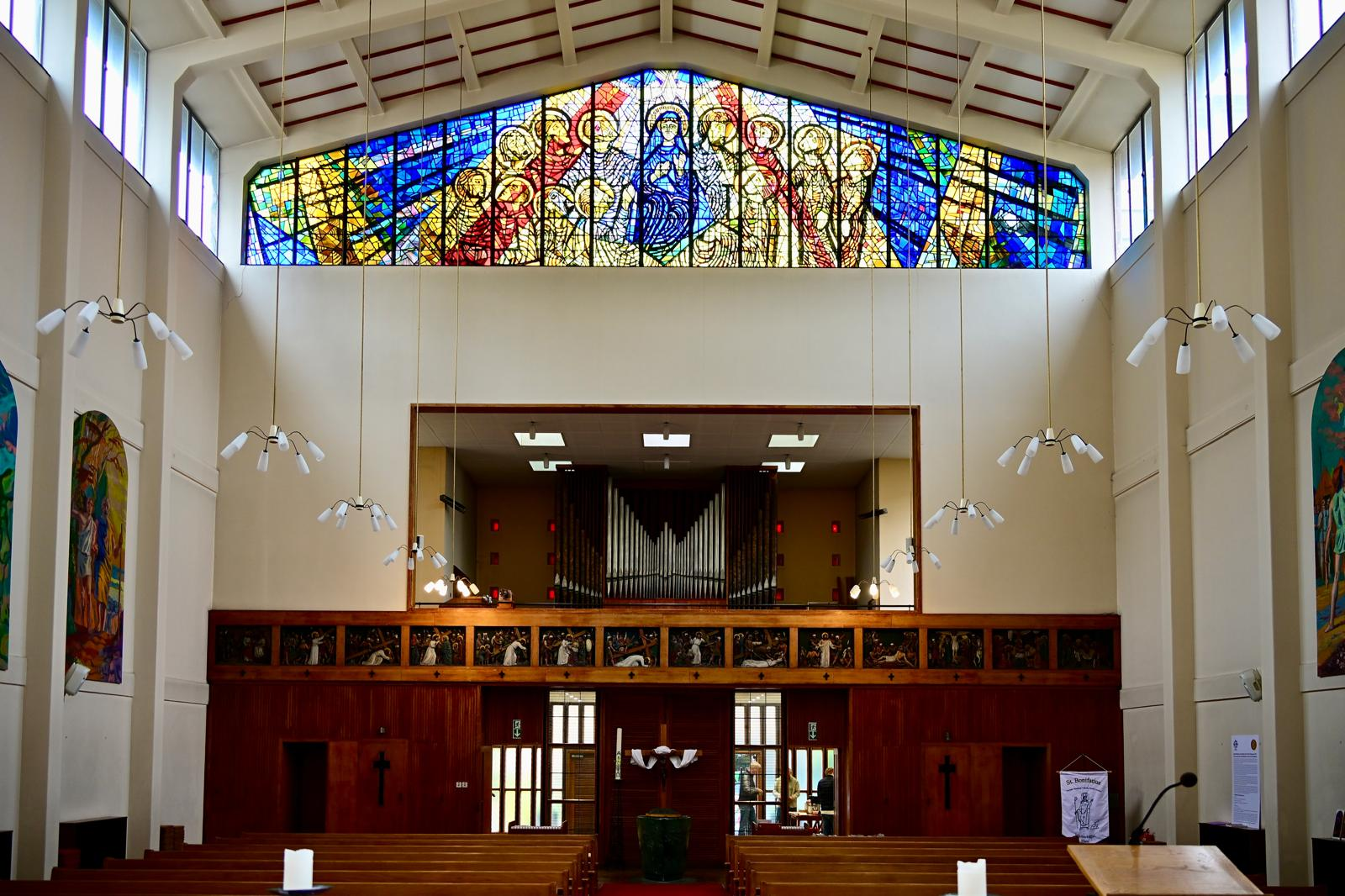
Interior view of nave towards organ loft

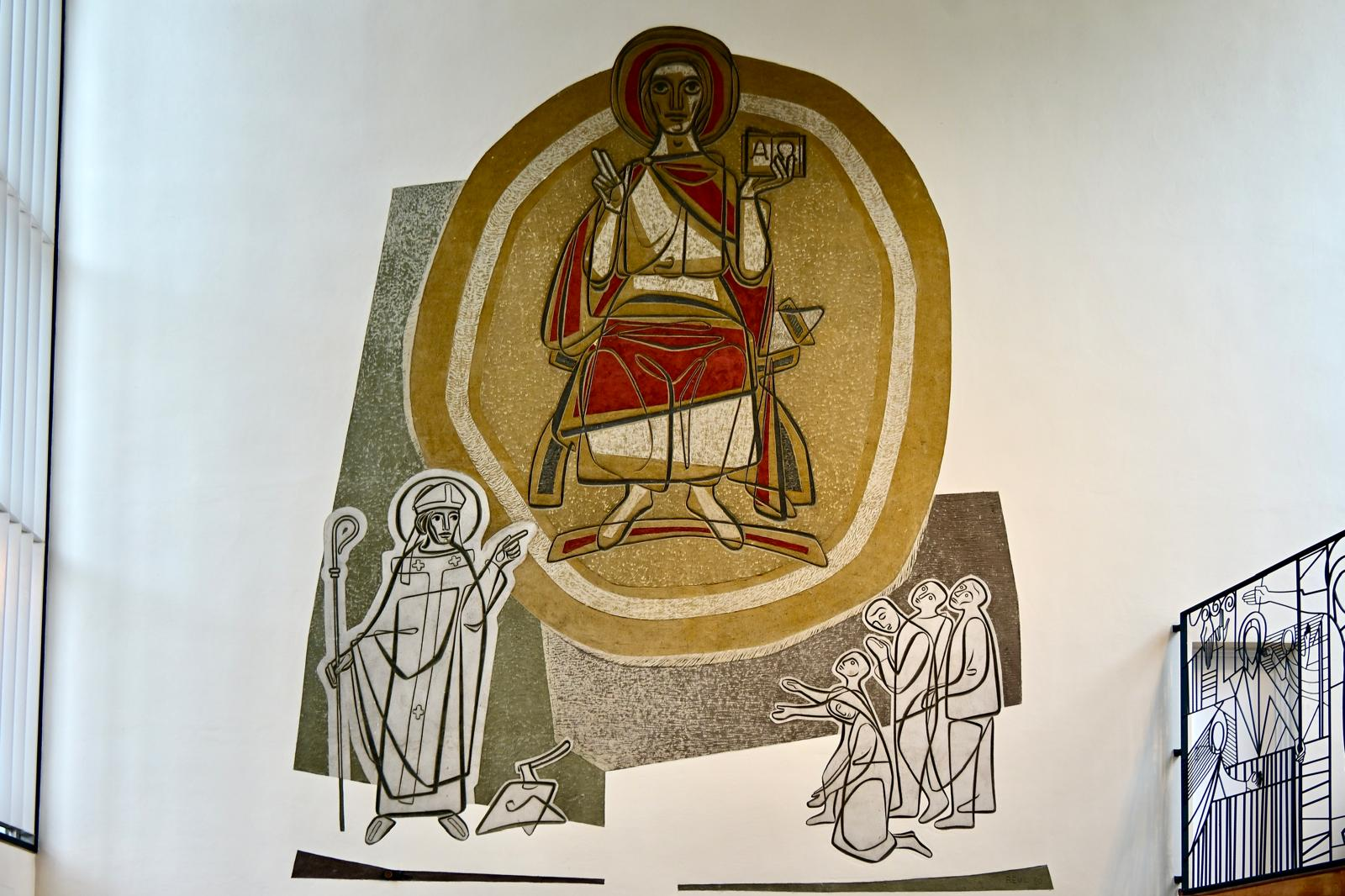
Sagraffio mural showing Christ in Glory with St Boniface and the Faithful by Heribert Reul, 1960

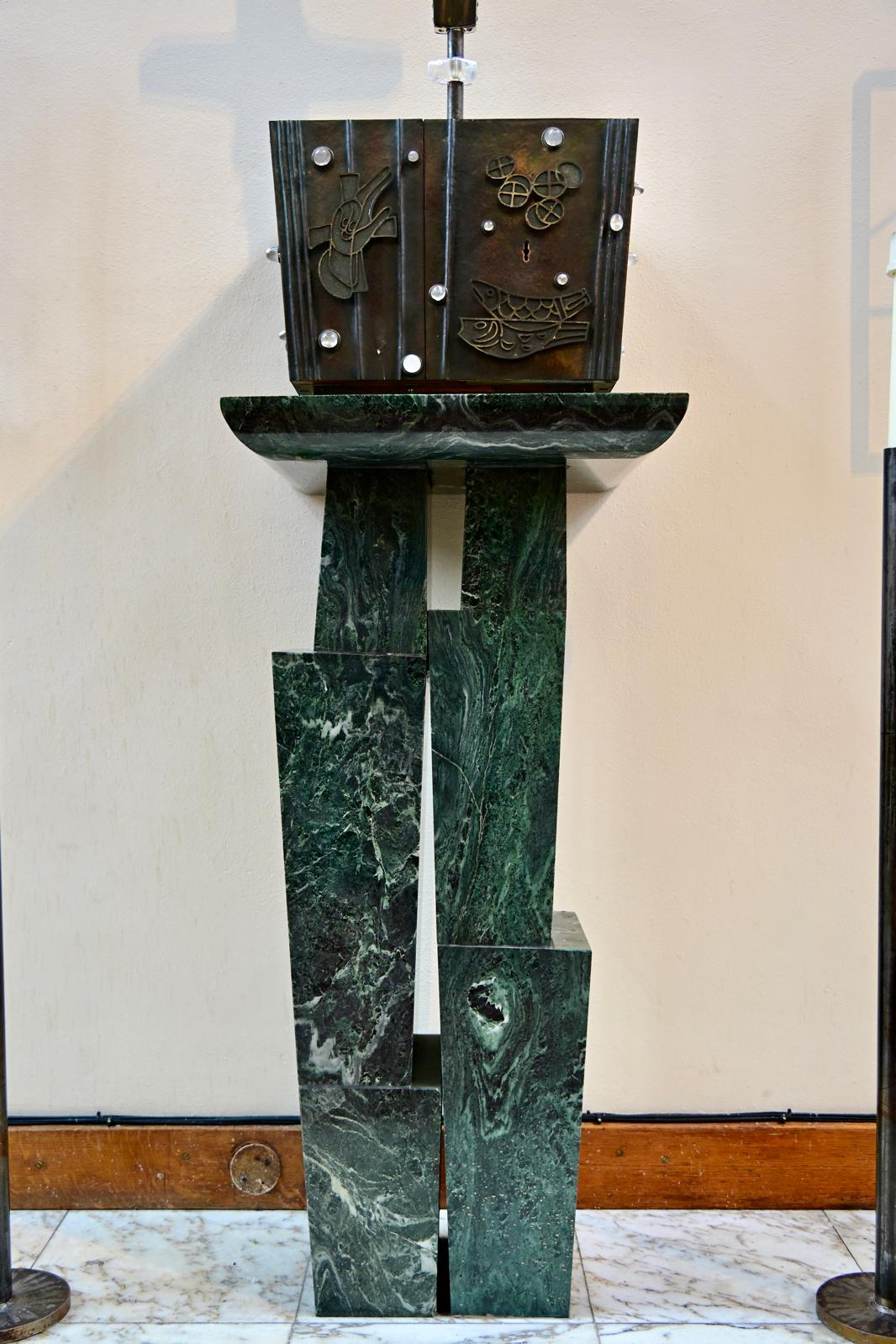
Tabernacle by Heribert Reul, 1960

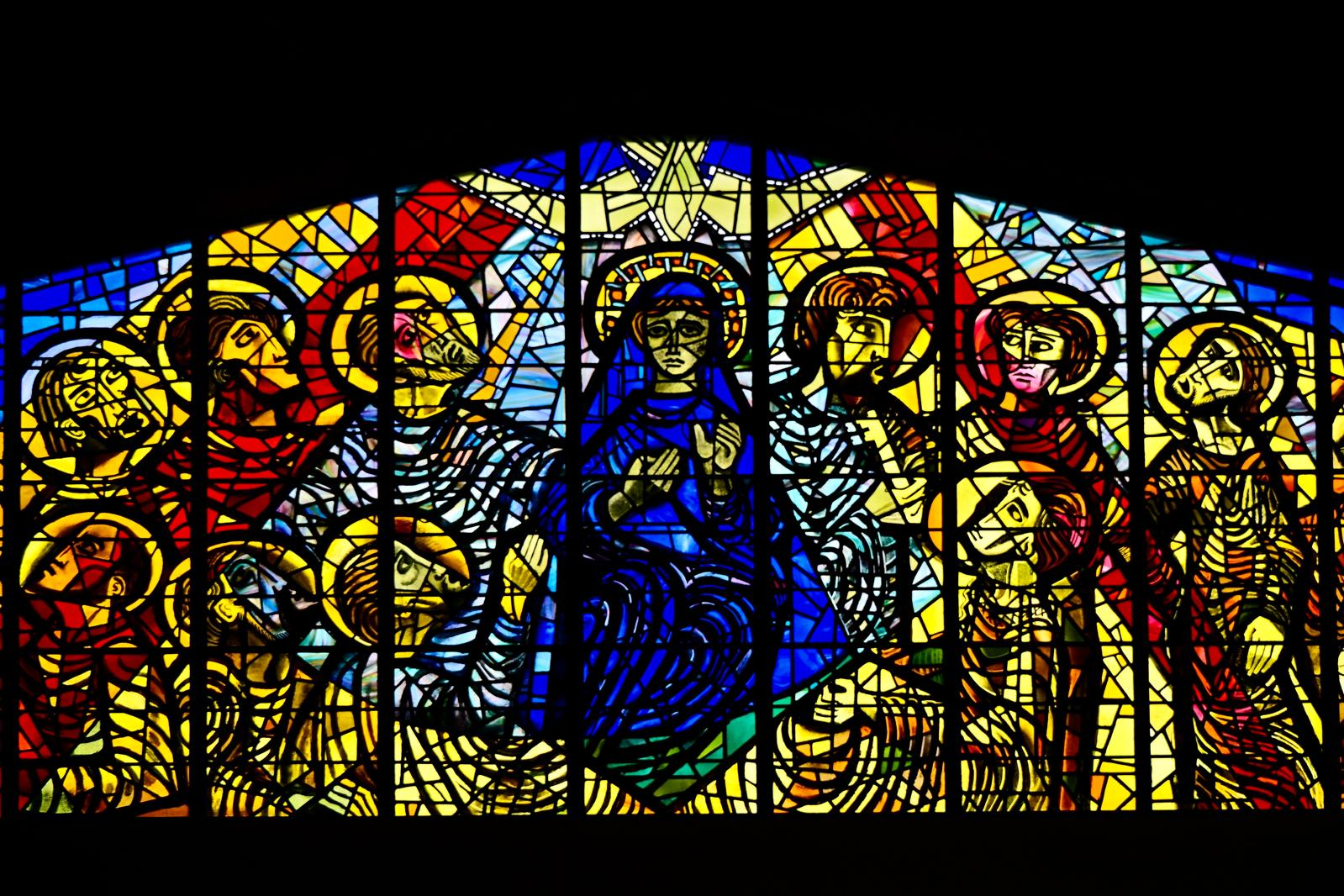
Pentecost window (detail) by Reginald Lloyd, 1960

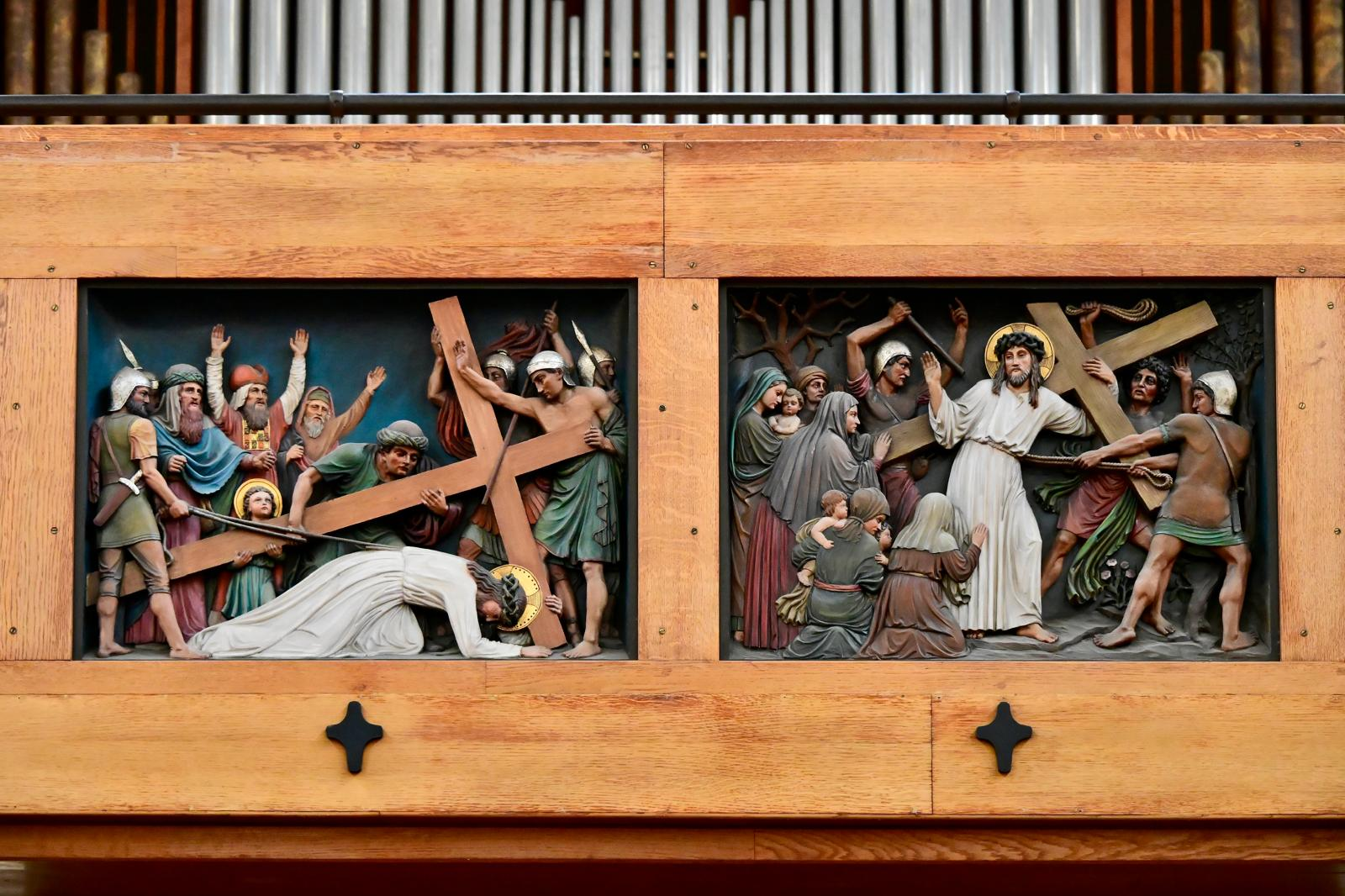
Two of 14 stations of the Cross by Georg Lang, 1912

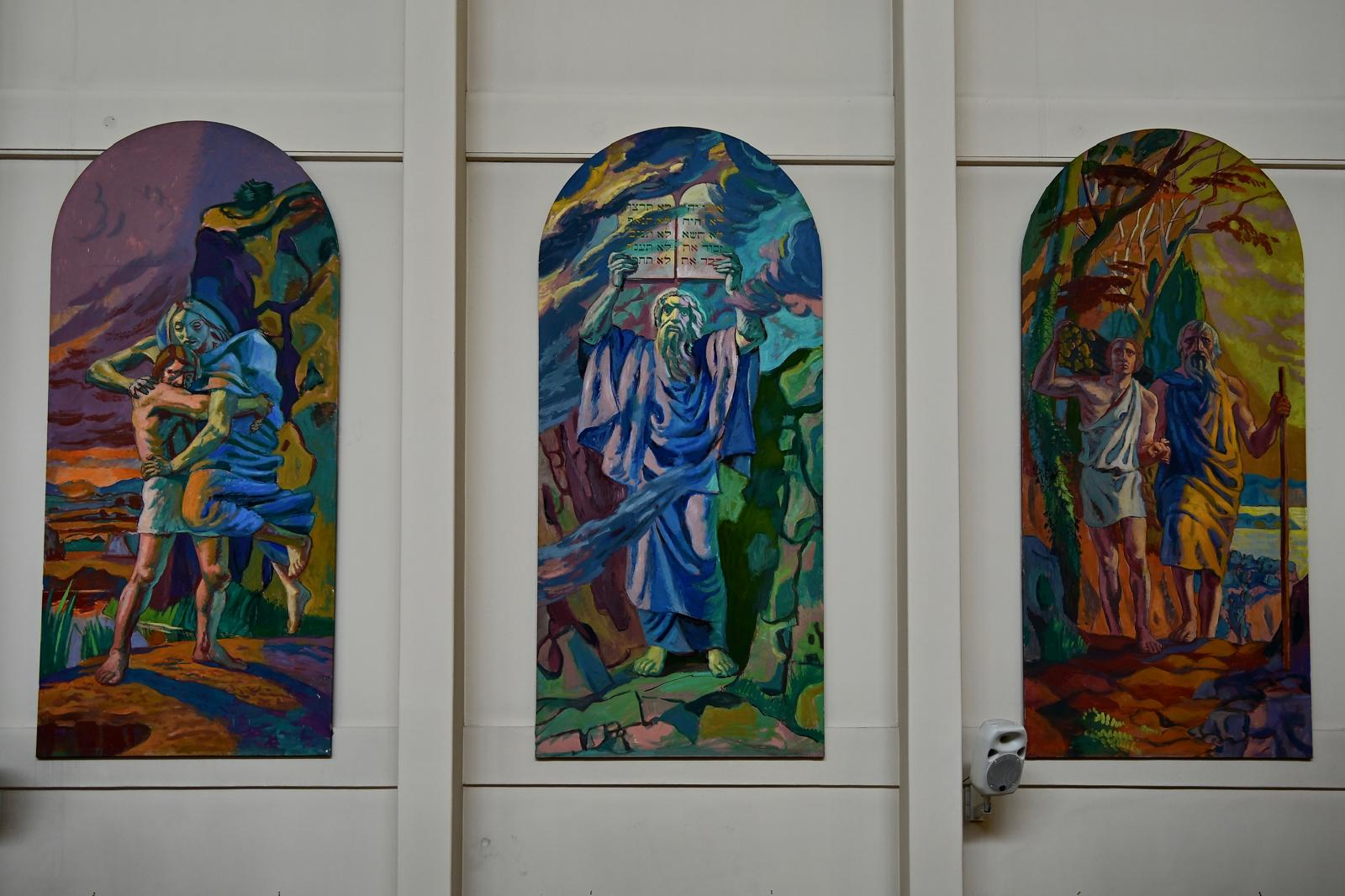
Three of five Old Testament murals by Hans Feibusch, 1973
