= Umberslade Baptist Church =

Coordinates: 52.3467°N 1.7859°W

- Christ Church Baptist Church
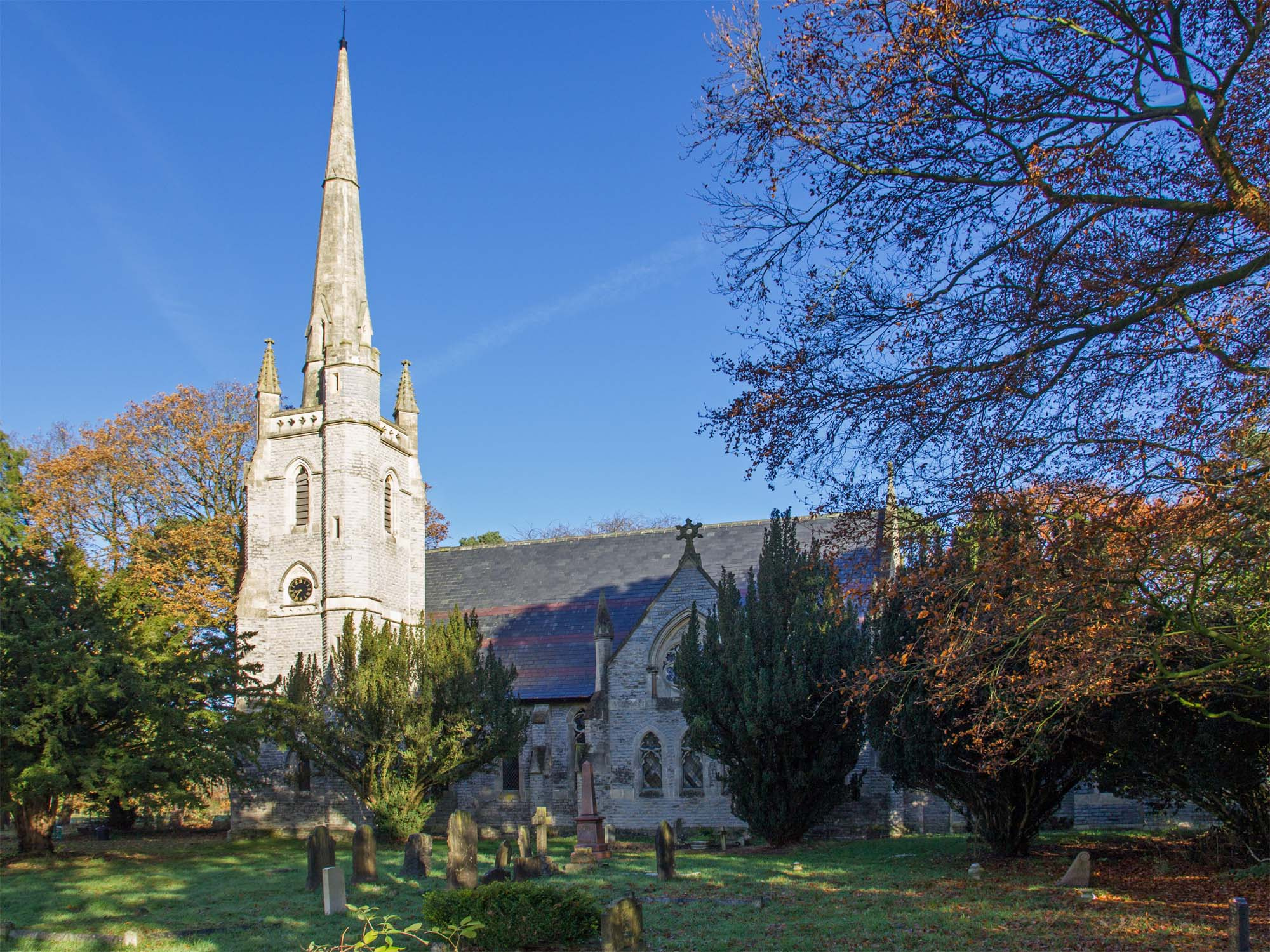

- Location in the West Midlands
- Location: Tanworth-in-Arden, Stratford-on-Avon, Warwickshire
- Country: England
- Denomination: Baptist
- Website: Umberslade Baptist Church

History
- Founded: 1877
- Founder: George Frederick Muntz junior
- Dedication: Christ Church

Architecture
- Functional status: Redundant
- Architect: George Ingall
- Architectural type: Church
- Style: Gothic Revival
- Groundbreaking: 1876
- Completed: Sept 1877

Specifications
- Materials: Blue lias stone with limestone dressings, Welsh slate roofs

Listed Building – Grade II*
- Official name: Christ Church Baptist Church, attached schoolrooms, and Church Hall
- Designated: 2 August 1972
- Reference no.: 1382428

Listed Building – Grade II
- Official name: War Memorial at Christ Church Baptist Church
- Designated: 9 July 2014
- Reference no.: 1420542

Umberslade Baptist Church is a redundant Baptist church southwest of the village of Hockley Heath, Solihull, West Midlands, England (grid reference SP147721). The church, attached school rooms, and the church hall were originally recorded in the National Heritage List for England as a designated Grade II listed building in 1972, but on 9 July 2014, the grading was raised to II*. The building is under the care of the Historic Chapels Trust.

== History ==
The church was commissioned by George Frederick Muntz, junior and designed by the Birmingham architect George Ingall. It was built in 1877 in Umberslade Park, the estate of Umberslade Hall, Muntz's country seat. A vestry was added to the east of the church in 1893. In the 2000s repairs, including re-roofing, were carried out by Midland Conservation Limited. They were completed in 2008 and cost about £500,000.

== Architecture ==
=== Structure ===
The church is constructed in blue lias stone with limestone dressings. The steep roofs are of Welsh slate and are hipped and gabled. It has a four bay nave with a north porch, north and south transepts, a chancel terminating in an apse, and a southwest tower, with a spire, incorporating another porch. The style is Decorated and it is elaborately detailed including pinnacles with finials. Around the church are lancet windows, those in the transepts have rose windows above them. The tower is in three stages. It has diagonal buttresses on three corners rising to the full height of the tower, surmounted by pinnacles. On the northeast corner is an octagonal stair turret with an embattled summit. The bottom stage of the tower has a west doorway with an arch under an ornamented porch. In the middle stage there are trefoil windows. The tall top stage has a clock face on each side over which are lancet bell openings. At the summit is a pierced quatrefoil parapet. The spire has gabled lucarnes.

=== Fittings and furniture ===
Internally the original furnishings are largely intact. They include the benches, the organ, the stained glass, and a Gothic style pulpit, in front of which is an open baptistry. On the floors are encaustic tiles. The two-manual organ was built by Bishop & Son of London in about 1878. There are eight chiming bells, all cast in 1878 by Gillett & Bland of Croydon, who also installed a chiming machine and a carillon. After being derelict for a time, the bells were restored in 1978 but, in the absence of an electrical supply, they cannot be sounded by the chiming machine.

== Present day ==
Open days and other events are organised by the local committee. The church is "the sole survivor among grand chapels associated with the rise of Birmingham Nonconformity". It is also the "last extant major chapel of... George Ingall".

== See also ==
- List of chapels preserved by the Historic Chapels Trust
