= Benjamin Creswick =

English sculptor

Benjamin Creswick RBSA
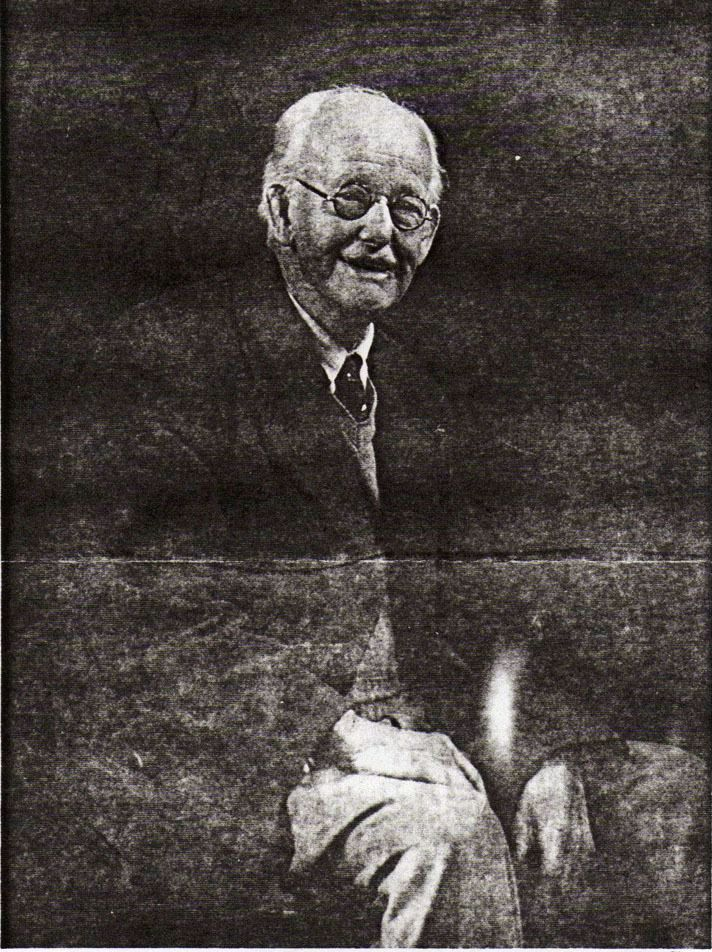
- Benjamin Creswick in old age
- Born: 1853; Sheffield, England
- Died: 1946 (aged 92–93)
- Occupation: Sculptor

Benjamin Creswick, RBSA (1853–1946) was an English sculptor.

== Life ==
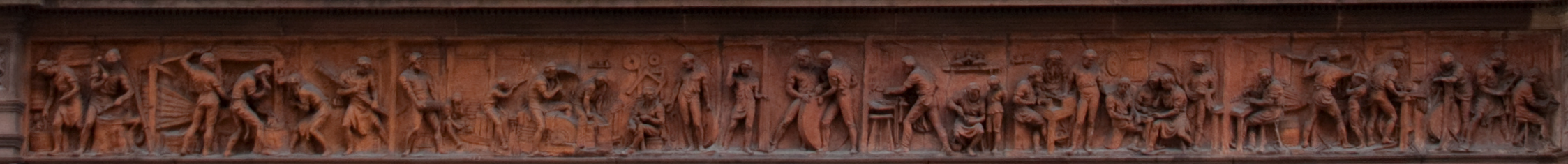
Cutlers Hall frieze

Benjamin Creswick was born in Sheffield, the son of a spectacle-maker. He started his working life as a knife-grinder, but took up sculpture with the encouragement of John Ruskin. In 1887 he modelled a terracotta frieze showing the processes of knife-grinding for the exterior of Cutlers' Hall, in Warwick Lane in the City of London. In the same year he made a frieze for Henry Heath's shop in Oxford Street, London, showing hat-makers at work.

Creswick worked on various projects with A.H. Mackmurdo, such as the decoration of Pownall Hall in Cheshire, and contributed to the display by Mackmurdo's Century Guild at the Inventions Exhibition in 1885, though he did not join the guild until the following year.

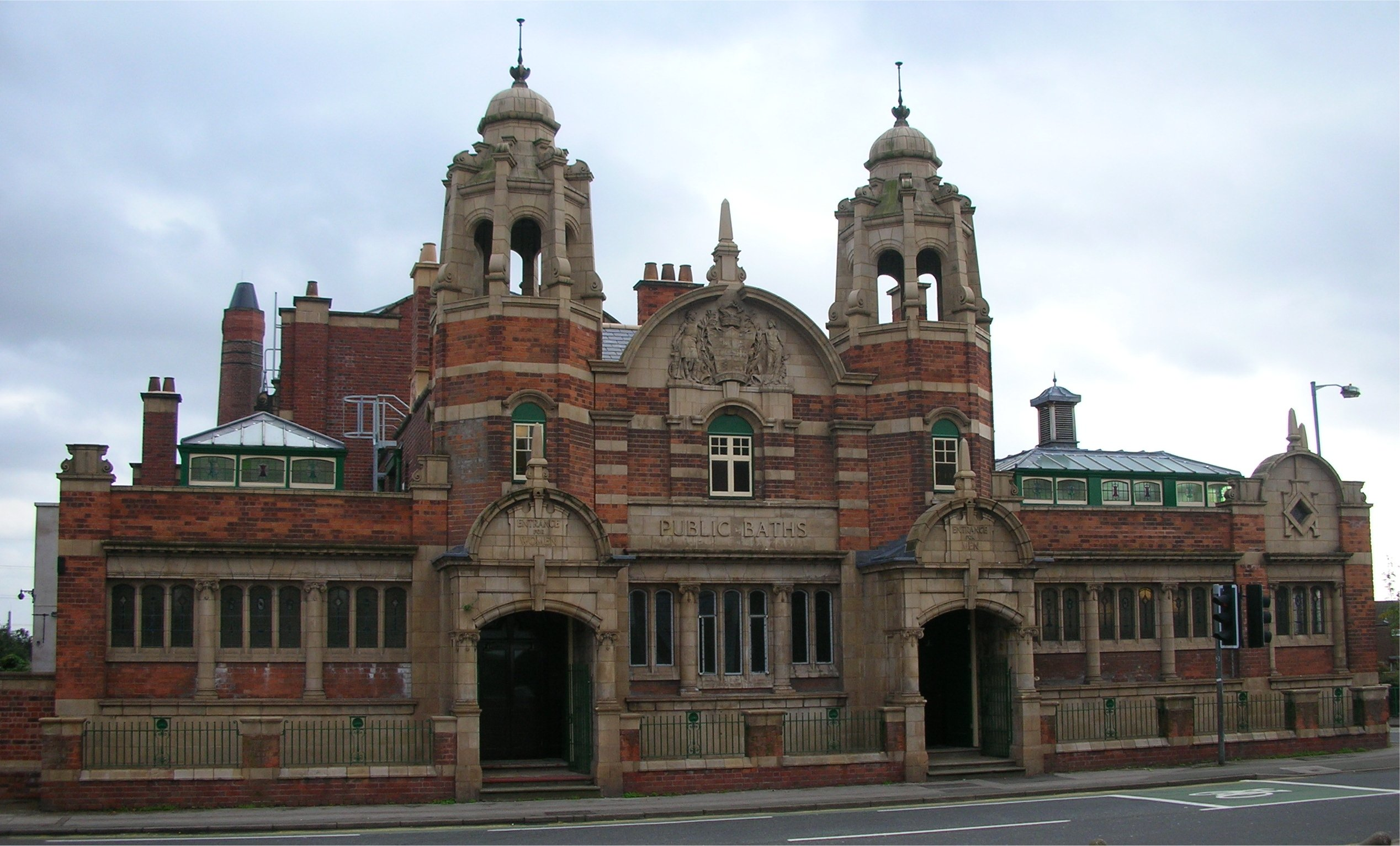
Nechells Swimming Baths – the central coat of arms is by Creswick

He spent some time in Liverpool and Manchester, before moving to Birmingham, where he was Master of Modelling and Modelled Design at the Birmingham School of Art from 1889 to 1918. He exhibited at the Royal Birmingham Society of Artists in 1914, becoming an associate, and subsequently a member, of the RBSA, and eventually its Professor of Sculpture. He was responsible for a number of architectural sculptures, which can still be seen on Birmingham buildings.

He lived at a house called Elmwood, in Jockey Road, Sutton Coldfield, then in Warwickshire.

His biography was co-written by his great-granddaughter, Annie Creswick Dawson.

== Works ==
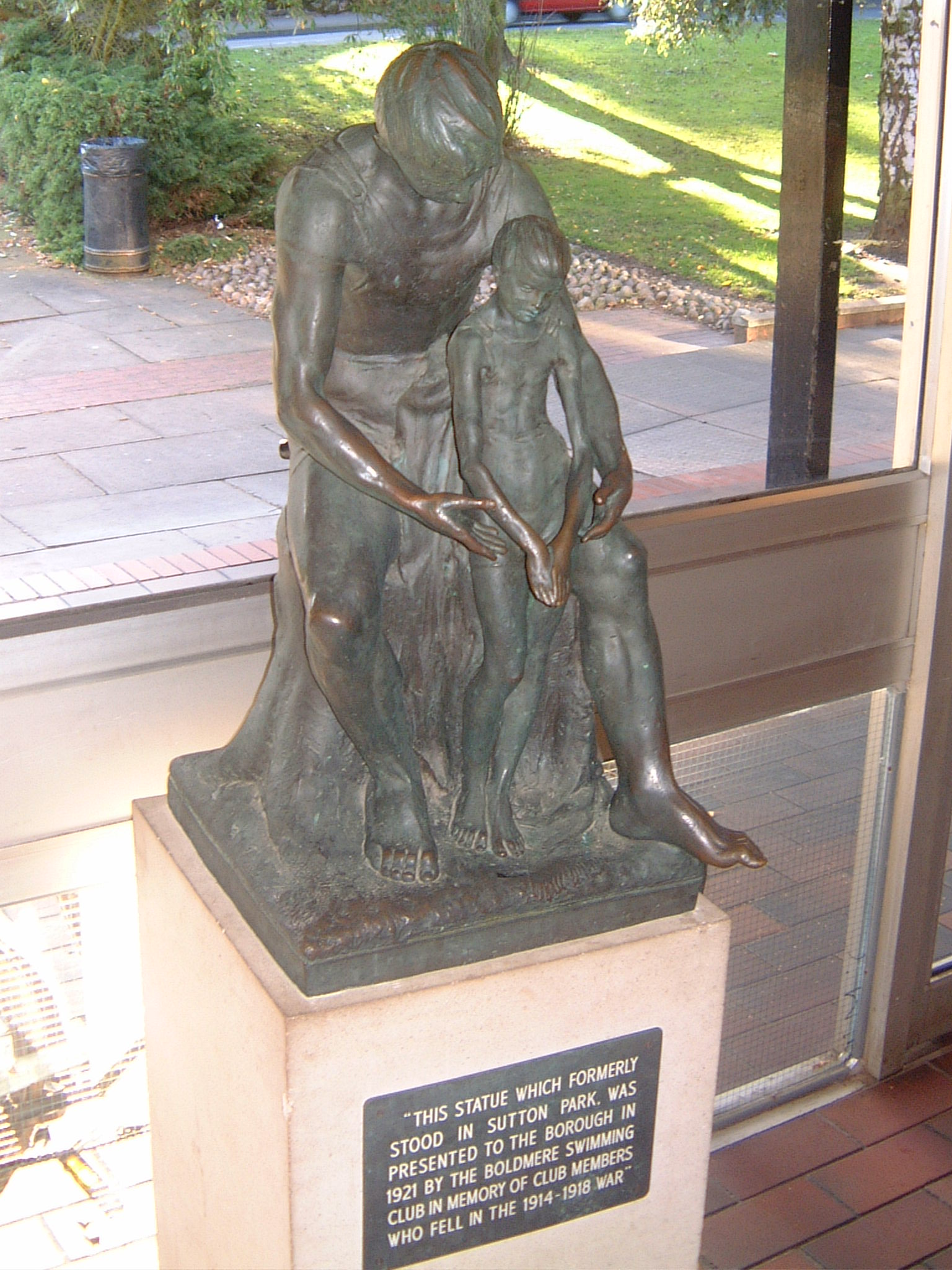
Boldmere Swimming Club memorial (1921)

- Boldmere Swimming Club memorial (1921) – now inside the swimming baths entrance of Wyndley Leisure Centre in Birmingham
- Bust of John Ruskin (plaster now in the collection of the Royal Birmingham Society of Artists)
- Carved figures on the choirstalls, Wallasey Memorial Unitarian Church, Merseyside
- Terracotta frieze on the facade of Cutlers Hall, Warwick Lane, London (1887)
- Portrait Roundel of Thomas Carlyle outside Carlyle's House, Cheyne Row, Chelsea
- Capitals of Bachelor's Staircase columns at Beaucastle, a house built for George Baker, a former mayor of Birmingham
- Carved stone medallion busts of authors, in the Tiled Hall at Leeds Central Library (formerly Municipal Buildings) (1884).
