= Benjamin Philpot =

Benjamin Philpot, MA (9 January 1790 in Laxfield – 28 May 1889 in Surbiton) was Archdeacon of Man from 22 May 1832 until 25 June 1839.

Philpot was educated at Christ's College, Cambridge. He held incumbencies in Walpole, Kirk Andreas, Great Cressingham, Lydney and Dennington.
