= Penrose Methodist Chapel =

Church in Cornwall, England

Coordinates: 50.4980°N 4.9971°W

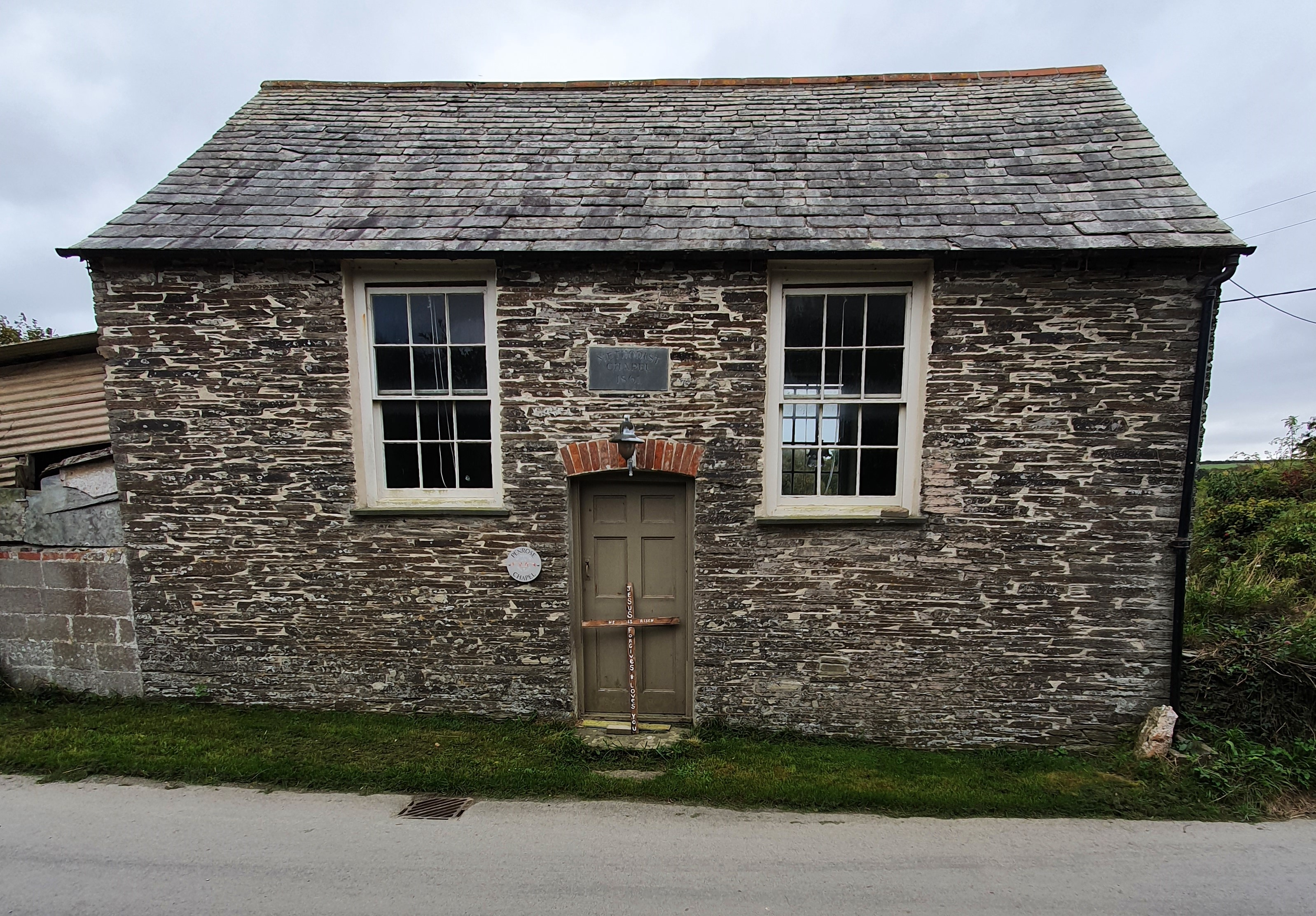

- Location in Cornwall
- OS grid reference: SW 876 707
- Location: Near St Ervan, Cornwall
- Country: England
- Denomination: Methodist
- Website: Penrose Methodist Chapel

Architecture
- Functional status: Redundant
- Architectural type: Chapel
- Completed: 1861

Specifications
- Materials: Slate

Listed Building – Grade II*
- Official name: Methodist Chapel
- Designated: 20 May 1988
- Reference no.: 1212478

Penrose Methodist Chapel is a redundant Methodist chapel approximately 1.5 miles (2 km) west of the hamlet of St Ervan in Cornwall, England. It is recorded in the National Heritage List for England as a designated Grade II* listed building, and is under the care of the Historic Chapels Trust.

== History ==
The chapel was built by James Tippett and his brother William, who were local stonemasons, and the foundation service was held on 24 May 1861. The first service was held on 17 November of that year, and despite being one of two Bible Christian chapels in the parish it became a successful congregation. However, by the 20th century the congregation was dwindling. A report in the Bible Christian Magazine of April 1903 reflected positively on the chapel, but it was evident that the congregation was by then small. In 1961 the chapel celebrated its centenary, but the congregation continued to decline and in 1998 the chapel finally closed. At this time Moira Tangye compiled a series of recollections of Penrose Chapel. In 2000 Penrose Chapel passed into the ownership of the Historic Chapels Trust.

== Architecture ==
The chapel was built in 1861 and is constructed in local slate. Its plan consists of a simple rectangle and it has a single storey. At the front of the chapel is a central doorway between two sash windows. At the rear are two windows, one is a sash window, and the other is fixed. The interior has plastered walls. The ramped box pews are original, as are the benches in the area once occupied by the musicians and choir. The chapel "survives as the most complete early plan arrangement of its date".

== The Bible Christians ==
The Bible Christians were a group which formed a distinctive Methodist denomination between 1815 and 1907. They were just one of a large number of Methodist groups that were widespread in the 19th century. The Methodist societies established by William O’Bryan (1778–1868) became known as the Bible Christians, and they first formed at Launcells and Shebbear along the Devon and Cornwall border largely on agricultural land. The first purpose-built Bible Christian chapel was at Shebbear in 1817. By the time Penrose opened in 1861, the Bible Christians were well established. In 1872 they had 18,438 members and 560 chapels. Discussions were held with the Methodist New Connexion, the Primitive Methodists and the United Methodist Free Church between the 1860s and 1900s, and in 1907 the Bible Christians united with them to form the United Methodists.

== Repairs and restoration ==
Although the chapel was in relatively good condition when the Trust took it over, it required re-roofing and this was done with traditional Cornish rag-stone thus returning the building to its original appearance. The exterior of the chapel has been re-pointed, and the plasterwork in the ceiling repaired. The present organ was restored by Bishop & Son of Ipswich.

== See also ==
- List of chapels preserved by the Historic Chapels Trust
- Bible Christian Church
