= Walpole Old Chapel =

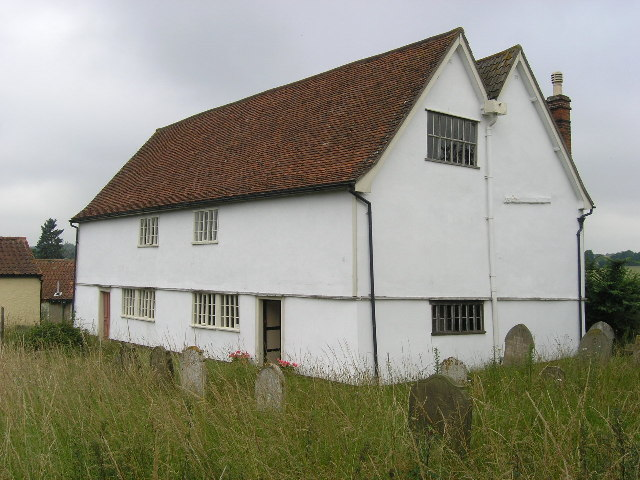
- Walpole Old Chapel

- Location in Suffolk
- 52.3232°N 1.4816°E
- Location: Halesworth Road, Walpole, Suffolk, England

History
- Built: Late 16th century
- Rebuilt: About 1689

Site notes
- Governing body: Historic Chapels Trust

Listed Building – Grade II*
- Official name: Congregational Chapel, Walpole
- Designated: 7 December 1966

Walpole Old Chapel is a redundant chapel in Halesworth Road, Walpole, Suffolk, England. Originally two farmhouses, it was converted into a chapel in the 17th century. It continued in use into the 20th century but closed in 1970. It is now owned by the Historic Chapels Trust.

== History ==
The building originated as two farmhouses in the late 16th century. In the middle of the 17th century a group of Independent Christians was meeting in the nearby village of Cookley. Following the passing of the Act of Toleration in 1689, which gave the right of freedom of worship to Nonconformists, six trustees from the group took out a lease on the building and the surrounding 1 acre (0.40 ha) of land, and converted the farmhouse into a chapel. In about 1700 an extension was added to the back of the building. Over the years attendance at the chapel declined, not helped by the establishment of an Independent chapel in the nearby town of Halesworth. Numbers continued to decline during the 20th century, and in 1958 the trusteeship was passed to the Suffolk Congregational Union. The chapel finally closed in 1970, following which the building remained unused. In 1995 it came into the care of the Historic Chapels Trust.

== Architecture and furnishings ==
The chapel has been designated by English Heritage as a Grade II* listed building. It is timber framed with some brick casing in the left-hand gable. The exterior is plastered and the roof is tiled. The entrance face contains two doors. The interior is dominated by the pulpit opposite the doors, and the main light for the chapel comes from round-arched windows, one on each sire of the pulpit. The pulpit is hexagonal and is raised, with a reading desk at a lower level in front of it. Over the pulpit is a hexagonal canopy with an ogee roof and a ball finial. The roof is supported by three circular timber columns. On three sides, opposite the pulpit and on the side walls, is a tiered gallery. The floor is brick. On the ground floor are eleven box pews; elsewhere on the ground floor and in the gallery seating is provided on benches. Suspended from the roof is a six-branched candelabrum dating from the 18th century. Outside the chapel is a grassed graveyard.

== Recent history and present day ==
Since taking ownership of the building, the Historic Chapels Trust has carried out repairs and modernisation, including the reinstatement of the historic painting scheme in the interior and, in 2007, the painting of the exterior. A detached outbuilding has been constructed to house WC and small kitchen to cater for events at the chapel. Three ecumenical services are held each year in the chapel, and at other times concerts and other events are organised. It is open for visitors on Saturday afternoons during the summer. The building is licensed for religious marriages, and can be used for baptisms and for blessings after civil marriages.

== See also ==
- List of chapels preserved by the Historic Chapels Trust
