= Wallasey Memorial Unitarian Church =

Coordinates: 53.4216°N 3.0410°W

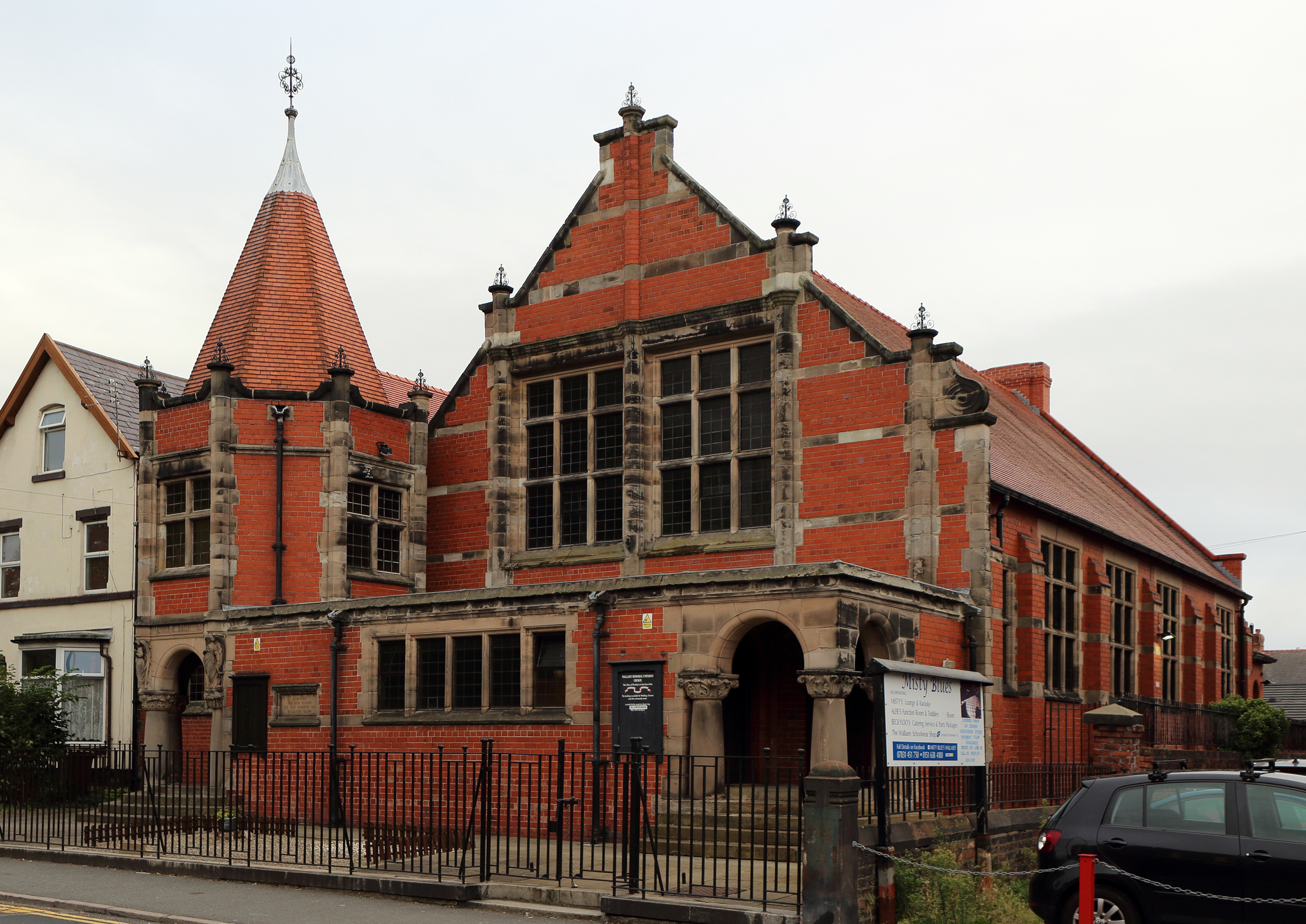

- Location in Merseyside
- OS grid reference: SJ 309 922
- Location: Manor Road, Liscard, Wallasey, Wirral, Merseyside
- Country: England
- Denomination: Unitarian
- Website: Wallasey Memorial Unitarian Church

Architecture
- Functional status: Redundant
- Heritage designation: Grade II*
- Designated: 20 January 1988
- Architect(s): Edmund Waring and Edmund Rathbone
- Architectural type: Church
- Style: Arts and Crafts
- Groundbreaking: 1898
- Completed: 1899

Specifications
- Materials: Brick with stone dressings, tile roof

Wallasey Memorial Unitarian Church is a redundant church in Manor Road, Liscard, Wallasey, Wirral, Merseyside, England. It is recorded in the National Heritage List for England as a designated Grade II* listed building, and is under the care of the Historic Chapels Trust.

== History ==
The church was built in 1898–99, and was designed by Edmund Waring and Edmund Rathbone. Its patron was Martha Elam, a local wealthy Unitarian; Rathbone was also a Unitarian and a scion of the prominent Liverspool banking and business dynasty, many of whom were nonconformist in religion and became Unitarians. Harold Rathbone, another member of the family, made the ceramic reredos which runs at high level above the sanctuary table of the church, and this is probably the largest executed work of the short-lived Della Robbia Pottery of Birkenhead.

== Rescue by Historic Chapels Trust ==
In 1993, following the retirement of its last minister, the congregation consisted of only four members, and it seemed likely that it would be demolished. However the quality of its interior fittings and furniture led to the publication of an article in Country Life, and 1995 the building was taken over by the Historic Chapels Trust. It reopened in October 2002.

The church is available for meetings, exhibitions and events, and is occasionally used for services of worship. It is licensed for Unitarian marriages.

The adjacent church hall is currently let to Wallasey School of Ballet.

== Architecture ==
The church is constructed in brick with stone dressings and has a tile roof, in the Flemish revival style popular at the time for libraries and civic buildings. It is notably un-ecclesiastical in style with no Christian or religious imagery on the outside. The church is rectangular in plan in six bays with a narthex. To its left is the church hall and a vestry. Also on the left is a porch with an octagonal turret.

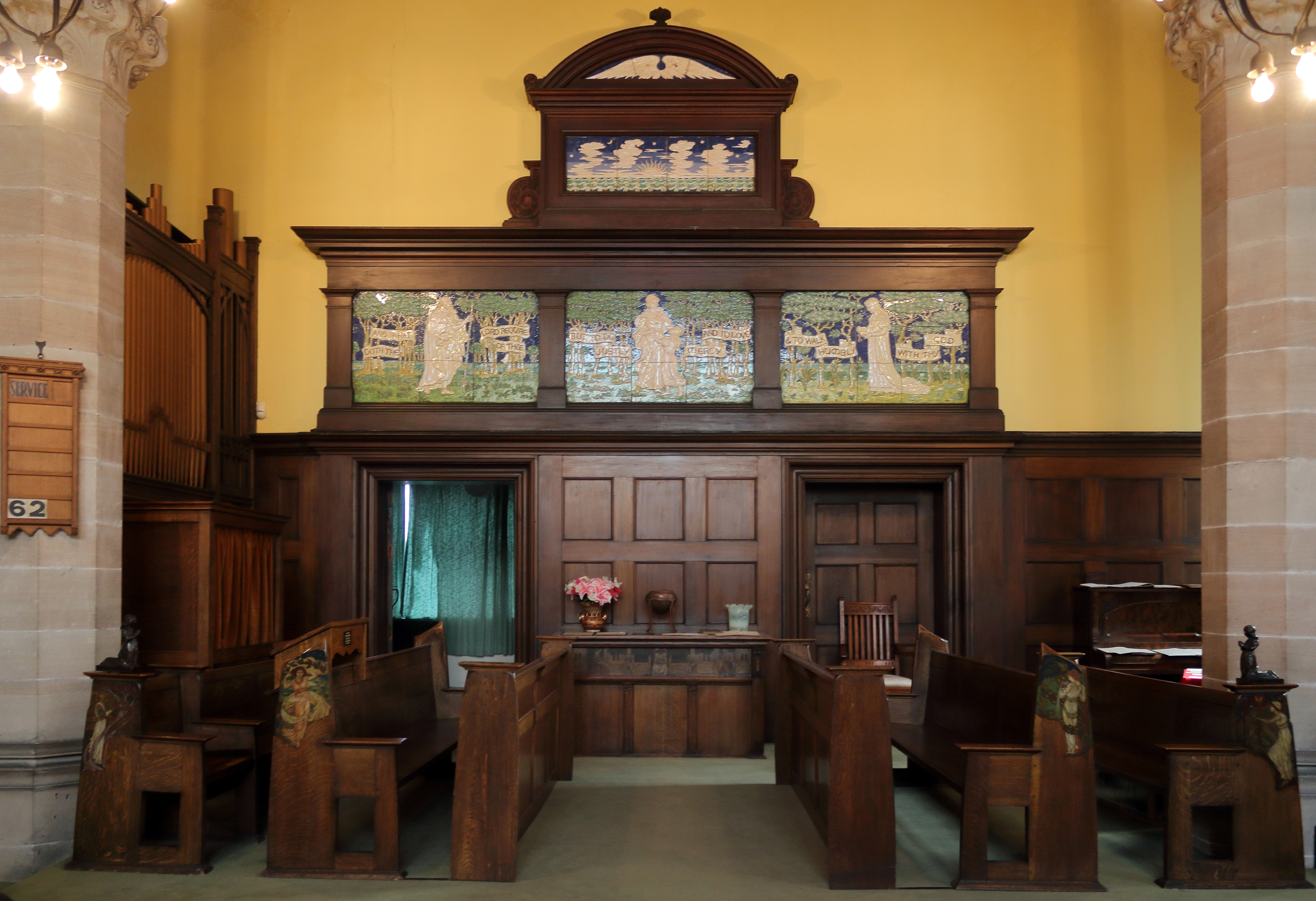
The chancel in Arts & Crafts style

The interior is "a rare, remarkable, example of English Arts and Crafts furnishing in a Nonconformist chapel". Its fittings were designed by craftsmen and designers from the Bromsgrove Guild. These include Bernard Sleigh who painted the panels on the ends of the choirstalls, communion table and pulpit, and Benjamin Creswick who carved the figures on the choirstalls. The reredos designed and by Harold Rathbone at his Della Robbia Pottery, in Birkenhead. Ironwork, including the electric light fittings, was designed by Walter Gilbert, who also made copper panels for the lectern.

== See also ==
- Grade II* listed buildings in Merseyside
- Listed buildings in Wallasey
- List of chapels preserved by the Historic Chapels Trust
