= Farfield Friends Meeting House =

Former Quaker meeting house in Addingham, England

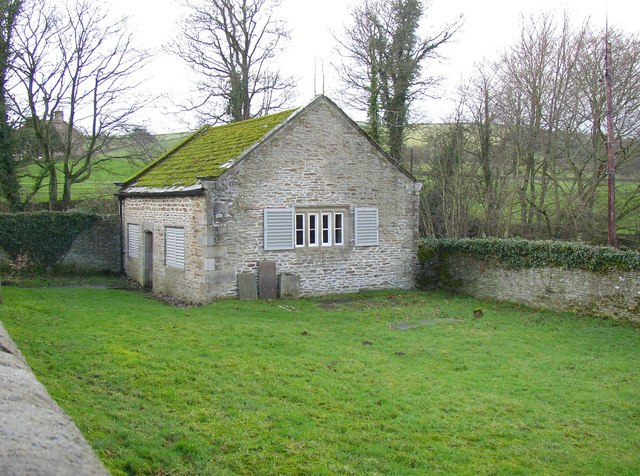
- Farfield Friends Meeting House

- Location in West Yorkshire
- 53.9621°N 1.8855°W
- Location: Near Addingham, West Yorkshire, England
- OS grid reference: SE 076 518

History
- Built: 1689
- Built for: Quakers

Site notes
- Governing body: Friends of Friendless Churches

Listed Building – Grade II*
- Designated: 25 January 1985
- Reference no.: 1199556

Farfield Friends Meeting House is a redundant Quaker meeting house near Addingham, West Yorkshire, England, built in 1689 on land given by the local Quaker Anthony Myers. It is recorded in the National Heritage List for England as a designated Grade II* listed building, and in 2018 Historic England selected it as one of ten sites nationally in the Faith and Belief category of A History of England in 100 Places. Quaker worship at Farfield had ceased by 1816, after which the building survived largely unaltered; it has been in the care of the charity Friends of Friendless Churches since December 2024, having previously been restored and maintained by the Historic Chapels Trust from 1994.

== History ==
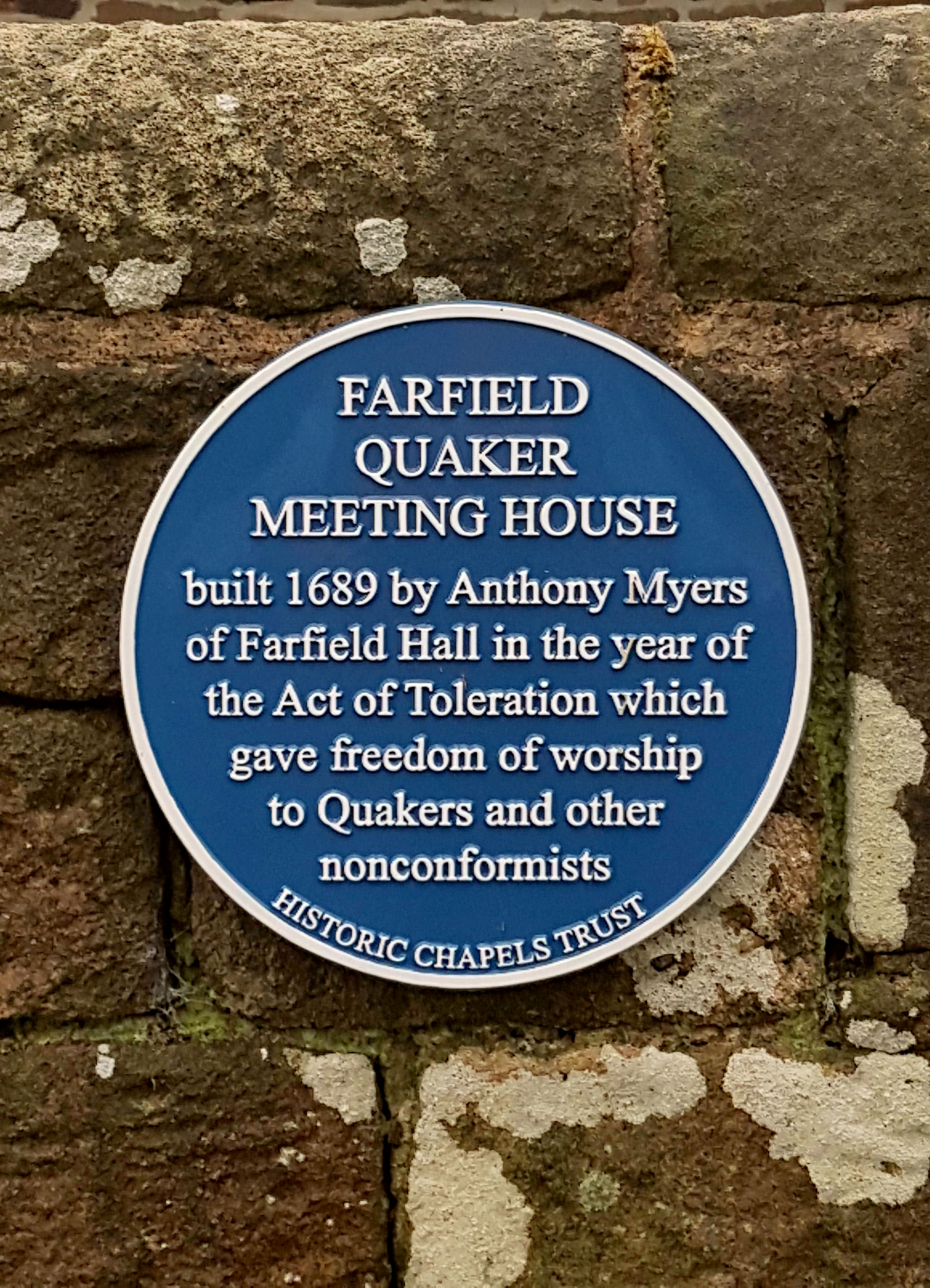
Plaque by Historic Chapels Trust

Quakerism reached the area around Bolton-in-Craven in the early 1650s through preaching by William Dewsbury, Christopher Taylor and Gervase Benson, who convinced the local landowner Anthony Myers of Farfield Hall; Myers began holding meetings at his home. In 1666, Anthony Myers of Farfield Hall, Addingham, provided a plot of land to be used as a Quaker burial ground. Twenty-three years later, in 1689, the Act of Toleration was passed giving the right to Nonconformists to build places of worship. In that year Anthony Myers gave a further adjacent plot of land for building a meeting house; the construction of this was completed during the same year.

Regular meetings for worship continued at Farfield until 1816, when declining local numbers led Friends to give up the building and instead rent a room in Addingham itself; the Addingham meeting was later transferred to Brighouse Monthly Meeting in 1853 and closed altogether in 1862. With no further Quaker meeting to serve, the Farfield building survived largely unaltered for over a century, remaining in Quaker ownership until the 1950s, when it was considered to be of little remaining historical interest and put up for sale on the open market. In 1956 four Quakers, including the children's author Elfrida Vipont, bought the meeting house for £220 to prevent its conversion into a private residence; it was subsequently used for a time as an artist's studio before passing, in 1994, into the care of the Historic Chapels Trust.

== Architecture and furnishings ==
The small meeting house is typical of rural Quaker meeting houses of the period, poignant in its simplicity. It is constructed in stone rubble with ashlar dressings and has a stone slate roof. The building is in a single storey with three bays. There is one door, and the three windows have mullions; at the corners of the building are quoins. The interior consists of a single cell. At its east end is a dais with settles and turned balusters.

== External features ==
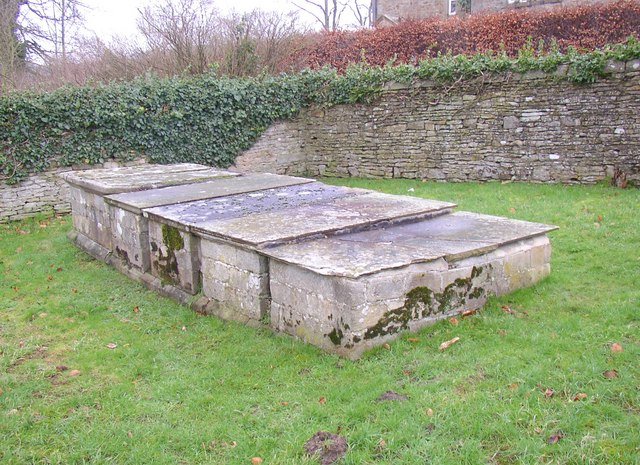
Chest tombs

In the graveyard to the northeast of the meeting house are five joined chest tombs to the Myers family dated between 1687 and 1737. They are designated as a Grade II listed building. This style of tomb is unusual in Quaker burial grounds as it was considered to be ostentatious and was later discouraged by the movement.

== Present day ==
Having been restored and maintained by the Historic Chapels Trust from 1994 as part of the physical evidence of British religious life, the building is now owned by the Friends of Friendless Churches, who took ownership of the site in December 2024 as the Historic Chapels Trust wound down its operations. It can be visited during daylight hours. Three car parking spaces and picnic area are adjacent. A long-distance footpath, the Dales Way, passes through the grounds. In 2018 Historic England placed the meeting house in the top ten of the Faith and Belief category of its A History of England in 100 Places project.

== See also ==
- Grade II* listed buildings in West Yorkshire
- Listed buildings in Addingham
- List of chapels preserved by the Historic Chapels Trust
