= Grittleton Strict Baptist Chapel =

Coordinates: 51.5193°N 2.2006°W

- Location in Wiltshire
- OS grid reference: ST 862 801
- Location: The Street, Grittleton, Wiltshire
- Country: England
- Denomination: Baptist

Architecture
- Heritage designation: Grade II*
- Designated: 29 May 1985
- Architectural type: Chapel

Specifications
- Materials: Stone, tiled roof

Grittleton Strict Baptist Chapel is a Baptist chapel in The Street, Grittleton, Wiltshire, England, which is recorded in the National Heritage List for England as a Grade II* listed building. As of 2026 the building is in private ownership.

== History ==
The chapel was built in about 1720, and opened in 1721. It was promoted and supported by the Houlton family of the local manor house. The chapel closed in 1982 but reopened in 2016, with regular services. It was owned by the Historic Chapels Trust from 2011, but by 2026 had been sold to the owners of the adjacent Grittleton House.

== Architecture ==
Built in rubble stone with ashlar dressings, the chapel has a tiled roof. Its plan is rectangular. On the east side are four mullioned and transomed windows. The doorway is on the south side. Inside are north and south galleries, with a vestry under the north gallery. In front of the vestry is an octagonal timber pulpit. Also in the chapel are box pews, three of which are in oak dating from the 18th century, the rest in deal from the 19th century. In addition there is a child's pew.
