= Coanwood Friends Meeting House =

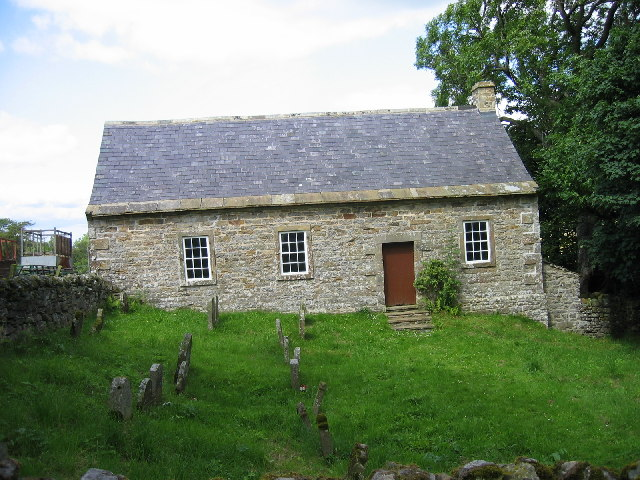
- Coanwood Friends Meeting House from the south

- Location in Northumberland
- 54.9243°N 2.4541°W
- Location: Coanwood, Northumberland, England
- OS grid reference: NY 709 590

History
- Built: 1760
- Built for: Coanwood Quaker Meeting

Site notes
- Governing body: Historic Chapels Trust

Listed Building – Grade II*
- Designated: 24 November 1967
- Reference no.: 1042914

Coanwood Friends Meeting House is a redundant Quaker meeting house under the care of the Historic Chapels Trust. It stands in an isolated, sparsely populated valley south of Hadrian's Wall, in East Coanwood, about 5 miles south of the town of Haltwhistle in Northumberland, England. It is recorded in the National Heritage List for England as a designated Grade II* listed building.

== History ==
The Wigham family was an important family in Northumberland in the 17th and 18th centuries. In about 1734 Cuthbert Wigham joined the Society of Friends and founded a meeting of the Society in Coanwood. The meeting house was built in 1760 at a cost of £104 (equivalent to £18,160 in 2025), on a plot of land given by Cuthbert Wigham. The meeting house is historically important because it has not been modified since then, other than the original heather-thatch roof being replaced by slates during the 19th century. The building has been used in the past by the Coanwood Reading Society, and contained a library with books to loan. Since coming under the care of the Historic Chapels Trust it has been repaired "in a manner that conserves its unique fabric and furnishings".

== Architecture ==
Coanwood Friends Meeting House is a single-storey building built on a plinth. Its plan is rectangular, measuring 31.1 metres (102 ft) long by 6.2 metres (20 ft) wide. It is constructed in squared stone in four bays with rusticated quoins and dressings. The roof has eaves of stone flags with slates above, and a stone ridge. There are fixed 12-pane windows in the two left (western) bays and in the bay on the right. Between them, in the third bay, are three steps leading up to a rectangular doorway. The lintel over the door is inscribed with the date 1760. The left and right sides are plain with gables and in the back wall is a 16-pane sash window. Attached to the right wall is a lean-to earth closet with a stone-slate roof.

The interior is divided into two rooms by a partition containing top-hinged shutters to the right of the entrance. The larger room on the left has a stone-flagged floor, and contains simple wooden benches. There is a central aisle with seven rows of open-backed benches facing to the west. Opposite these and facing them are two rows of benches on a dais; these are sometimes called elders' benches. The benches form "a rare survival of the historic Quaker layout". The smaller room contains a fireplace and a grate with an iron hob. The meeting house stands in a graveyard that contains "typical Quaker gravestones", many of which commemorate members of the Wigham family.

== Present day ==
The meeting house is in an area where there are many walkers' paths. It is normally left unlocked during daylight hours and open to visitors. In September each year the Hexham Quaker Meeting holds a meeting for worship and a family picnic at the meeting house.

== See also ==
- List of chapels preserved by the Historic Chapels Trust
