= Walpole, Suffolk =

Village in Suffolk, England

Coordinates: 52.3180°N 1.4687°E

Walpole
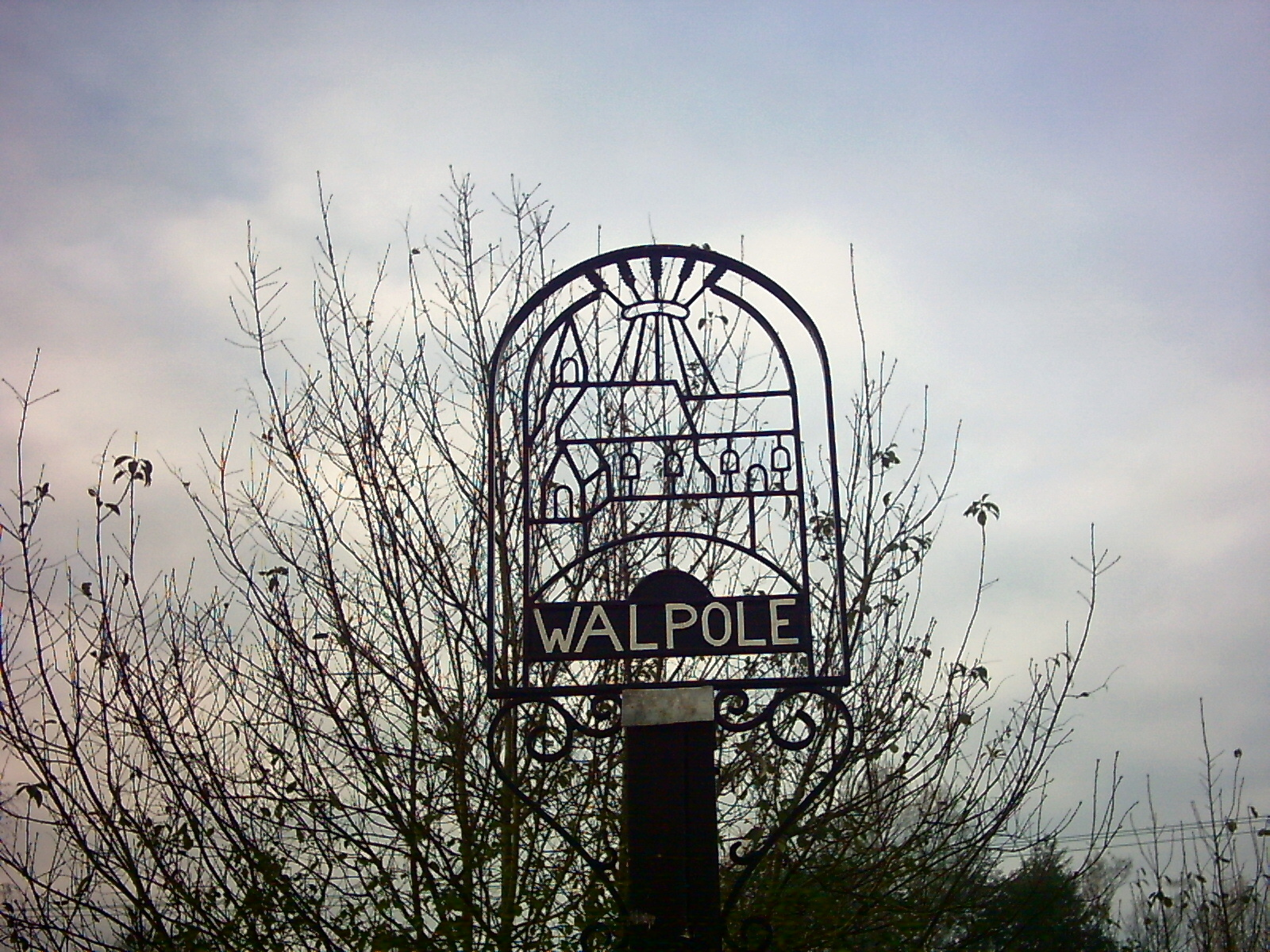
- Walpole sign

- Location within Suffolk
- Population: 238 (2011)
- OS grid reference: TM366745
- District: East Suffolk
- Shire county: Suffolk
- Region: East
- Country: England
- Sovereign state: United Kingdom
- Post town: Halesworth
- Postcode district: IP19
- Dialling code: 01986
- Police: Suffolk
- Fire: Suffolk
- Ambulance: East of England
- UK Parliament: Suffolk Coastal

Walpole is a small village and civil parish in the district of East Suffolk in Suffolk, England. Walpole has a parish church (dedicated to St Mary), a redundant chapel (Walpole Old Chapel), but the primary school has closed. The village is on the River Blyth. Nearby settlements include the town of Halesworth and the village of Cookley. It was in the hundred of Blything. It had a population of 238 according to the 2011 census.

== History ==
The name 'Walpole' derives from the old English meaning 'Pool of the Britons'.

Walpole appears in the Domesday Book, in the Blything Hundred. It has a population of 28 households- 6 villagers, 5 smallholders, and 17 free men. It has 6 men's plough teams, and other resources include a meadow of 6 acres, 30 woodland pigs, and 1 church. The lord in 1086 was Alan IV, Duke of Brittany.

In 1870–72, Walpole was described as:

a parish, with a village, in Blything district, Suffolk; 2½ miles SW of Halesworth r. station. Pop., 540. Houses, 115. The manor belongs to Lord Huntingfield. There are an endowed Independent chapel, an endowed school, and charities £11.

Walpole has experienced many boundary changes over time. It was part of the Blything registration district until 1935 when the district was abolished to become part of Blyth, Wainford, and Lothingland registration districts respectively. Walpole joined the Blyth district, transferring a population of 16,640. Walpole remained part of the Blyth district until 1983 when this district too was abolished, to become parts of the Deben and Waveney registration districts respectively. It became part of the Waveney district in 1983 until 2010 when the district was abolished to become part of the Suffolk registration district.

Walpole is known for being a sort of mecca for church crawlers- people who like to study the architecture of the church buildings rather than visiting for religious purposes themselves, with St Mary's Church and Walpole Old Chapel being the attractions here.

== Demographics ==
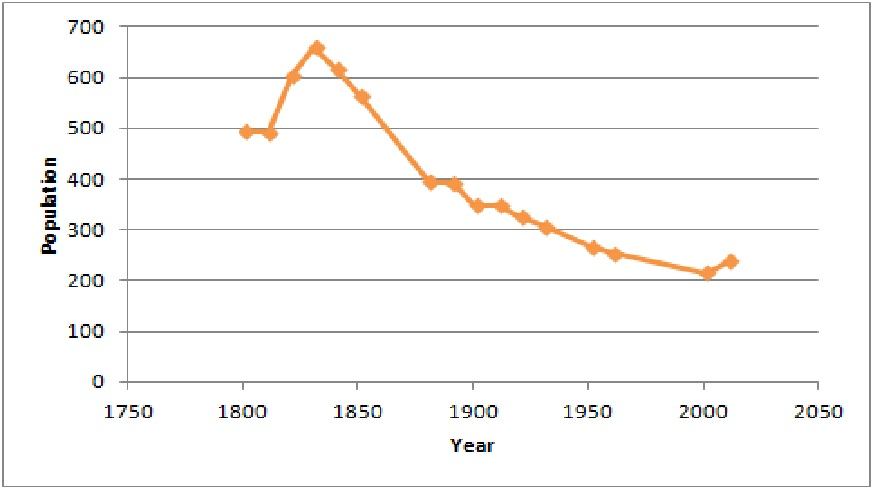
Total Population of Walpole Civil Parish, Suffolk, as reported by the Census of Population from 1801 to 2011.

Occupational graph for males aged 20 and over in Walpole in 1831

=== Population ===
Population data on Walpole dates back to as early as 1801, when the population was 494. There have been many fluctuations in the population from 1801 to 2011, with the pattern showing a continuous decrease in numbers from 1831 to 2011. 1831 recorded the highest population figure at 658, whilst the lowest population figure was recorded in 2001 at just 215, a decrease of 67.4% of the 1831 figure. 2011 census shows that 15.6% of the population are aged 0–15, 74.3% aged between 16 and 74, and just 10.1% aged 75 and over. The average age being 46.2 years old.

=== Housing ===
The typical housing types in Walpole are detached, semi-detached, and terraced. Housing ownership is typically owner-occupied. Overall average 2014 house prices in Walpole was £225,000. This figure was higher than average house prices in nearby Halesworth where average prices were £168,882 and Bramfield where average house prices were £143,975. Selling prices in the previous year were down 37% of the selling prices in the year before, and down 62% of the 2005 average selling price.

=== Occupational history ===
Occupation data for 1831 reflects the social status' of the people of Walpole from that time. 83 of the 135 were classed as labourers and servants, 35 classed as middling sorts, and only 17 were employers and professionals. According to 1831 data, occupation in Walpole for males aged 20 or over was divided into 9 occupational categories. The main category was agricultural labourers, followed by retail and handicrafts. There were no jobs in manufacturing, and very few in other categories. In 1881, males were still predominantly working in the agricultural industry, with 50 out of 96 males involved in agriculture. Work for males did begin to increase however in occupations such as House, Furniture and Decorations, and Food and Lodging. Women, as expected, were very different in 1881 occupational status'. 71 out of 95 females had an unknown occupation, whilst 12 worked in domestic service or offices. Few worked in agriculture, and some worked as professionals or workers in dress. However, data from the most recent census in 2011 shows, as expected, a complete differentiation in occupational status'. Statistics for 2011 show that 123 of residents aged between 16 and 74 are currently in employment, that figure being 51.6% of the total Walpole population. The census data reported that wholesale and retail trade, and education were the biggest sectors in 2011 employment, both at 13%. Manufacturing accounted for 10% of the 2011 employment, compared to 0 in the 1831 census. This would probably be due to the changes in technology which have allowed industries in Walpole and the rest of Britain to shift from the primary sectors of work, to the secondary and tertiary.

=== Education ===
The local mixed gender primary school closest to Walpole is situated 2.3 miles away in Bramfield. The school is for children aged between 4-11 and currently has 89 students in total, of which 52.8% are boys and 47.2% are girls. In 2013 the school reported 91% to be achieving Level 4 or above in reading, writing and maths. The last Ofsted inspection was carried out on 21 January 2015 and was rated 'Inadequate'.

== Transport ==
The closest railway station is located approximately 2.9 miles away in nearby Halesworth, approximately a 10-minute drive away from Walpole. Walpole has no local bus service.

== Places of interest ==
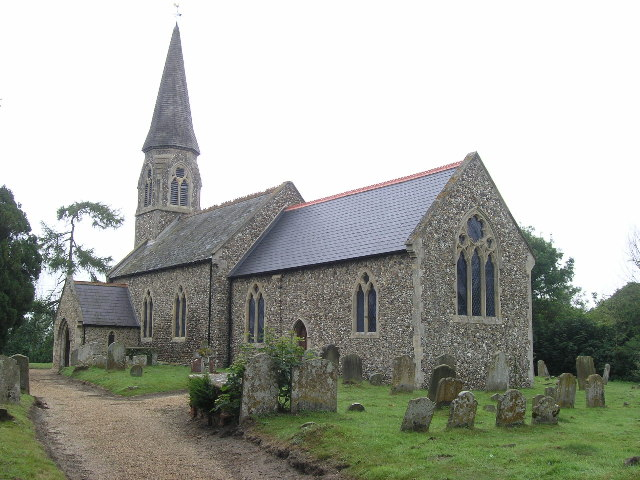
St Mary's Church

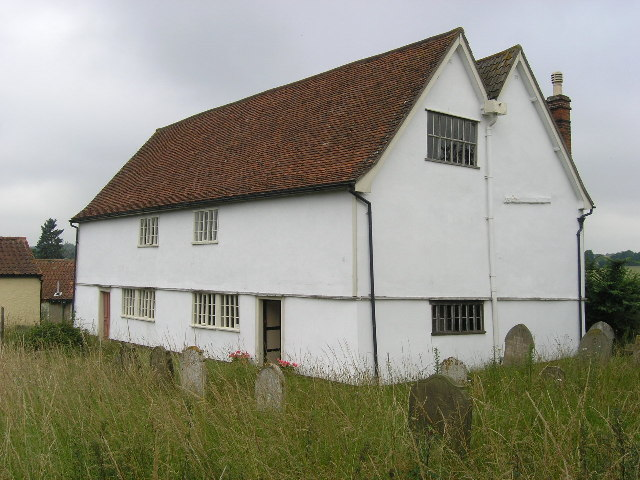
Walpole Old Chapel- Congregational Chapel

=== Church of St Mary ===
Inside the Parish Church is a dish inscribed with the names dedicated to dead soldiers who were from Walpole. Dedicated on 11 May 1949, the Roll of Honour consists of five soldiers from World War One, and four from World War Two. Two of these soldiers are buried in Walpole at St Mary Churchyard. St Mary's church is one of 23 listed buildings in Walpole. The church is listed as Grade II and has been listed for surviving medieval work since 7 December 1966. The core of the church dates back to the 12th century or earlier, with much being restored in 1878. The tower and aisle remains entire still to this date.

=== Bell Cottage The Old Bell ===
Previously used as an inn, this is now three private dwellings. Just like the Church of St Mary this is also listed as Grade II and has been listed since 19 March 1985. The building dates back to the early 19th century, made from red brick, and three storeys high.

=== Congregational Chapel ===
On the road out of Walpole heading towards Halesworth can be found the Congregational Chapel of Walpole. The worshipping life of the chapel ended in 1970. Despite this, annual services are still held here with the chapel now being in the care of Historic Chapels Trust. The chapel is described as:

an awe-inspiring experience; one of the rare opportunities left to us to obtain a sense of what it was like to be a proud, yet marginalised community in 17th and 18th century rural England.

=== The Old Thatch ===
Also listed as Grade II, The Old Thatch has been listed since 19 March 1985. It is a 16th-century timber-framed and plastered cottage with a thatched roof.

=== Cookley Lake ===
A family owned two-acre fishing lake open all year round for fishing.

== Notable residents ==
- John Austin (1613–69); lawyer, controversial writer, and one of the founding Fellows of the Royal Society.
- Benjamin Philpot (1790–1889); clergy and later Archdeacon of Man
