= St George's German Lutheran Church =

Coordinates: 51°30′51″N 0°4′14″W

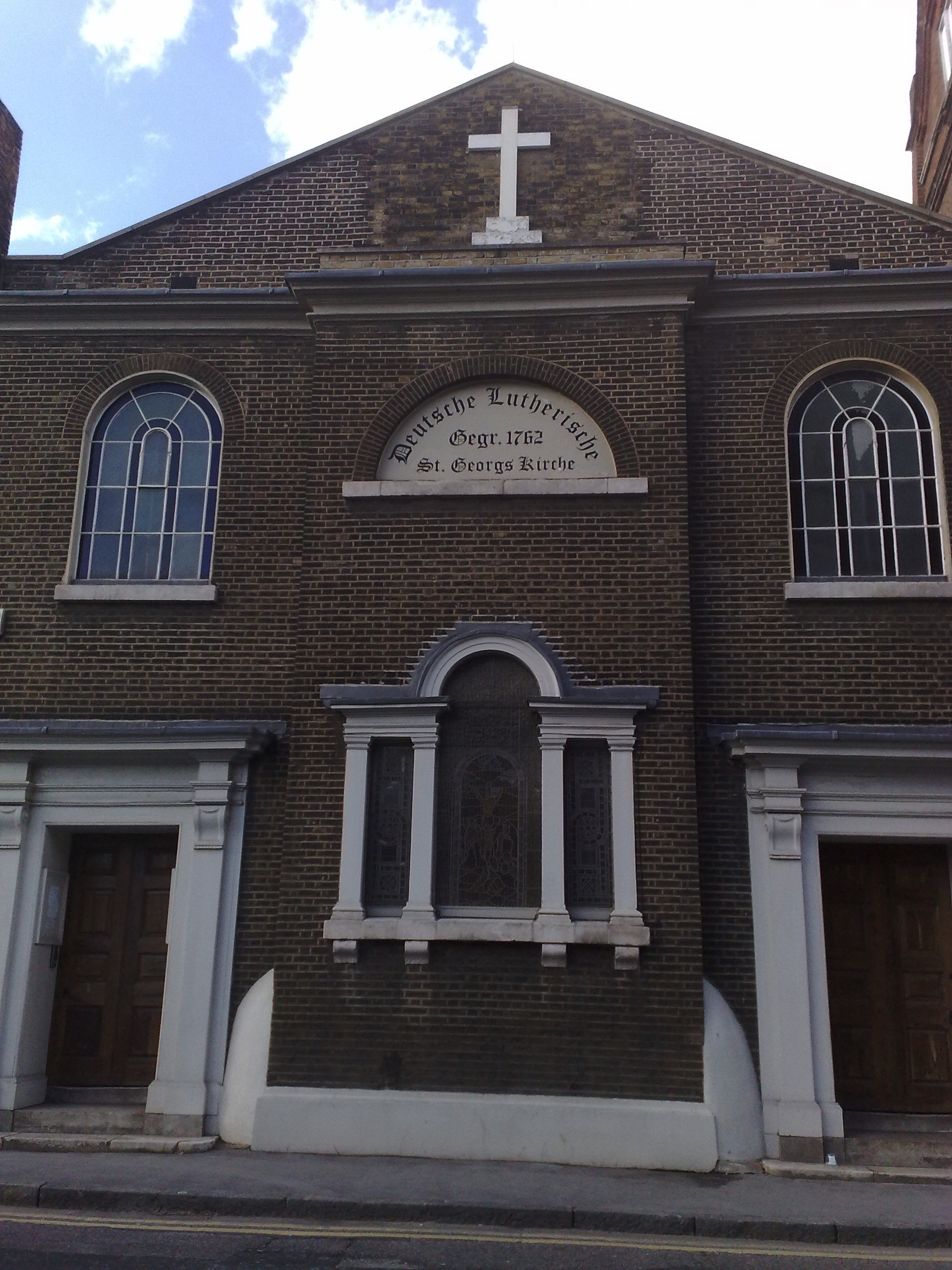
- St George's German Lutheran Church
- Location: Alie Street, London Borough of Tower Hamlets
- Denomination: Lutheran

History
- Founded: 1762
- Founder: Dietrich Beckman

St George's German Lutheran Church is a church in Alie Street, Whitechapel, London. Located in the East End of London. From its foundation in 1762 until 1995, St George's served a congregation of German Lutherans. Between 1995 and 2025 the church was owned by the Historic Chapels Trust. Since 2025 it belongs to Council of Lutheran Churches in Great Britain as a worship space for several Lutheran member churches, including the former German congregation.

St George's was the fifth Lutheran church to be built in London. It is now the oldest surviving German Lutheran church building in the United Kingdom.

== Foundation and history ==
The principal founder was Diederich Beckman, a successful sugar refiner who donated much of the money required to buy the site and erect the church. Beckman's nephew, Gustav Anton Wachsel from Logabirum near Leer/Ostfriesland, became the first pastor. At the time, the street was called "Little Ayliffe Street" and the area was called "Goodman's Fields". The name of the street changed to "Alie Street" about 1800. This area of Whitechapel had many sugar refiners of German descent in the nineteenth century and they initially constituted most of the congregation. At its height, there were an estimated 16,000 German Lutherans in Whitechapel and the area was sometimes referred to as Little Germany. In 1887 St Paul's German Reformed Church in Goulston Street became a close neighbour of St George's, but was destroyed during the Second World War. St George's Church is one of the last visible reminders of the once thriving German community in East London.

While in 1853 St George's churchyard and crypt had to be closed, this presented an opportunity to add a Kleinkinderschule [nursery school] to St George's English and German School which had been founded in 1805. The school provided bi-lingual elementary education for boys and girls up to the age of 14 and offered several welfare projects including a kitchen that fed children and adults free of charge for over a decade. The school had to close in 1917 when Pastor Georg Mätzold, by then the only German-speaking teacher, was ordered to leave the country by the British Government.

== Care for the needy and persecuted ==
Throughout its long history, St George's Church took seriously its Christian duty of caring for the vulnerable and needy. In 1763 the congregation supported about 600 adults and children from the Palatinate and Würzburg who had hoped to travel to the Virgin Islands of St John and St Croix. Unfortunately the officer in charge abandoned them in London with no money or resources and no knowledge of English. Pastor Wachsel appealed for help on their behalf. The Tower of London gave them 200 tents to protect them from the elements, and there were charitable contributions of 600 pounds. King George III intervened and enabled them to travel to Carolina instead.

In 1930 Dr Julius Rieger from Berlin became the pastor of St George's. Three years later Dr Dietrich Bonhoeffer, a prominent theologian and anti-Nazi activist was appointed the pastor of St Paul's. These two men soon became friends and under Bonhoeffer's influence, Julius Rieger became a supporter of the most radical wing of the Bekennende Kirche [Confessing Church] that centred around Pastor Martin Niemöller in Berlin-Dahlem. After 1935 Rieger developed worship and pastoral care at St George's in line with the principles of the Confessing Church and supported several hundred persecuted Protestants who had to flee the German Reich because of their Jewish descent.

== Interior features ==
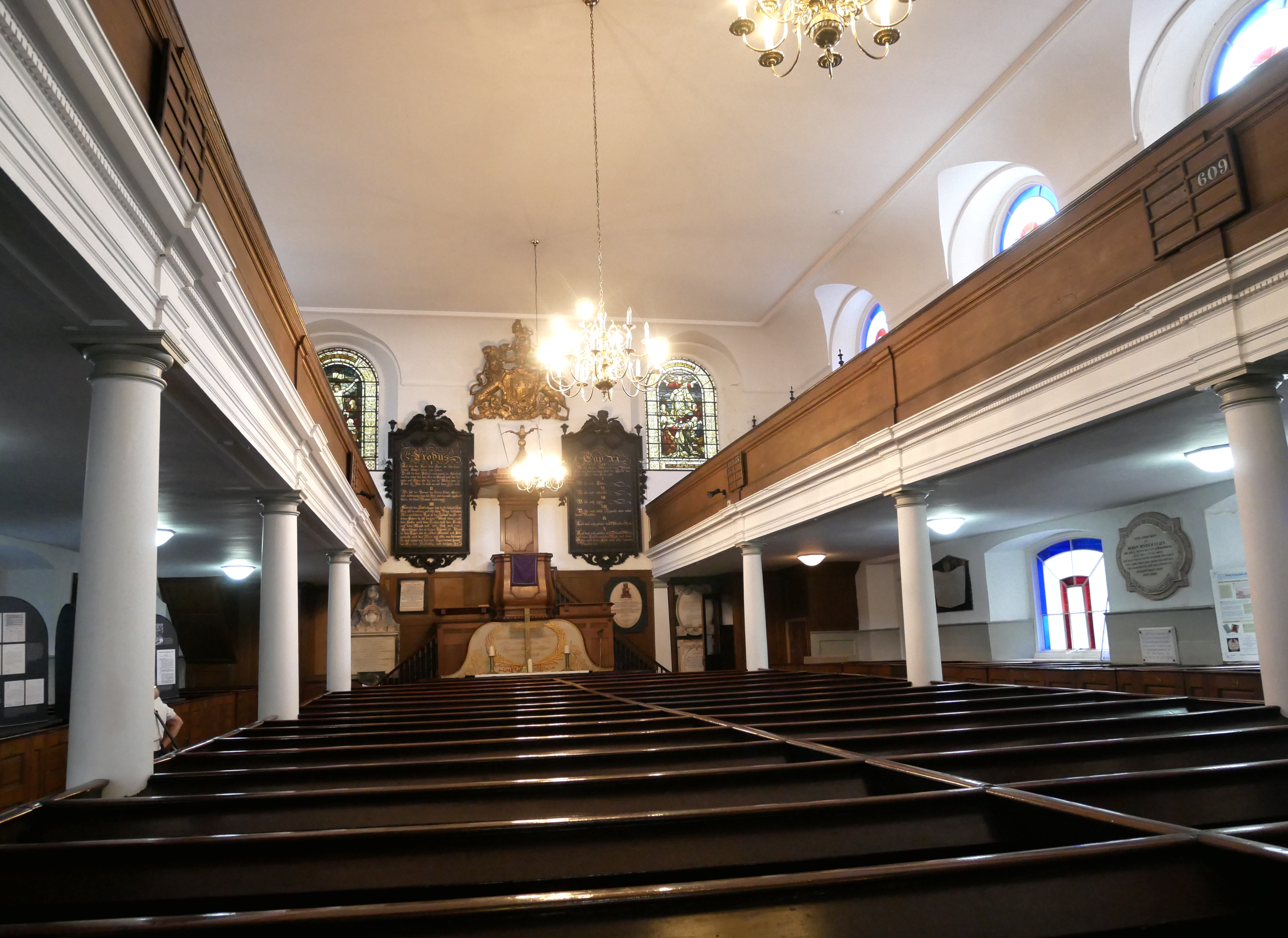
North-facing view inside the church

The church retains a set of furnishings, mostly from the 18th century, including a set of box pews and a high central double-decker pulpit and sounding board. The coat-of-arms of King George III (pre-1801) and two carved timber commandment boards in German hang in the church. The Royal Arms were required to be erected in Anglican churches but were adopted by nonconformist congregations voluntarily, as a mark of loyalty. There are donations boards for the church and adjoining former church school. Among the donors listed is the King of Prussia.

== The Organ ==
The earliest known record of an organ at St George's dates to 1764. The current organ was built in 1886 by the Walcker family, renowned organ builders from Ludwigsburg. The same firm enlarged it in 1937, retaining the Neo-Gothoc case and much of the original pipework. The organ contains many features typical of 19th century German Romantic instruments including pneumatic action, free combination pistons and a Rollschwelle - a cylindrical roller mounted directly above the centre of the pedalboard - which allows the organist to create continuous and often seamless crescendos or diminuendos during a passage of music. For organists interested in German Romantic organ music, the organ provides invaluable insight into the opportunities and restrictions imposed on performers by such instruments.

== Bell tower ==
The street frontage was crowned by a baroque bell tower in copper-covered timber. This was taken down in the 1930s at the insistence of the District Surveyor as unsafe and has not to date been replaced. A plain brick pediment and cement cross replaced it, somewhat diminishing the architecture of the frontage. The former location of the bell tower can still be discerned in the brickwork. The bell and weathervane from the tower were saved and remain in the church.

== Restoration ==
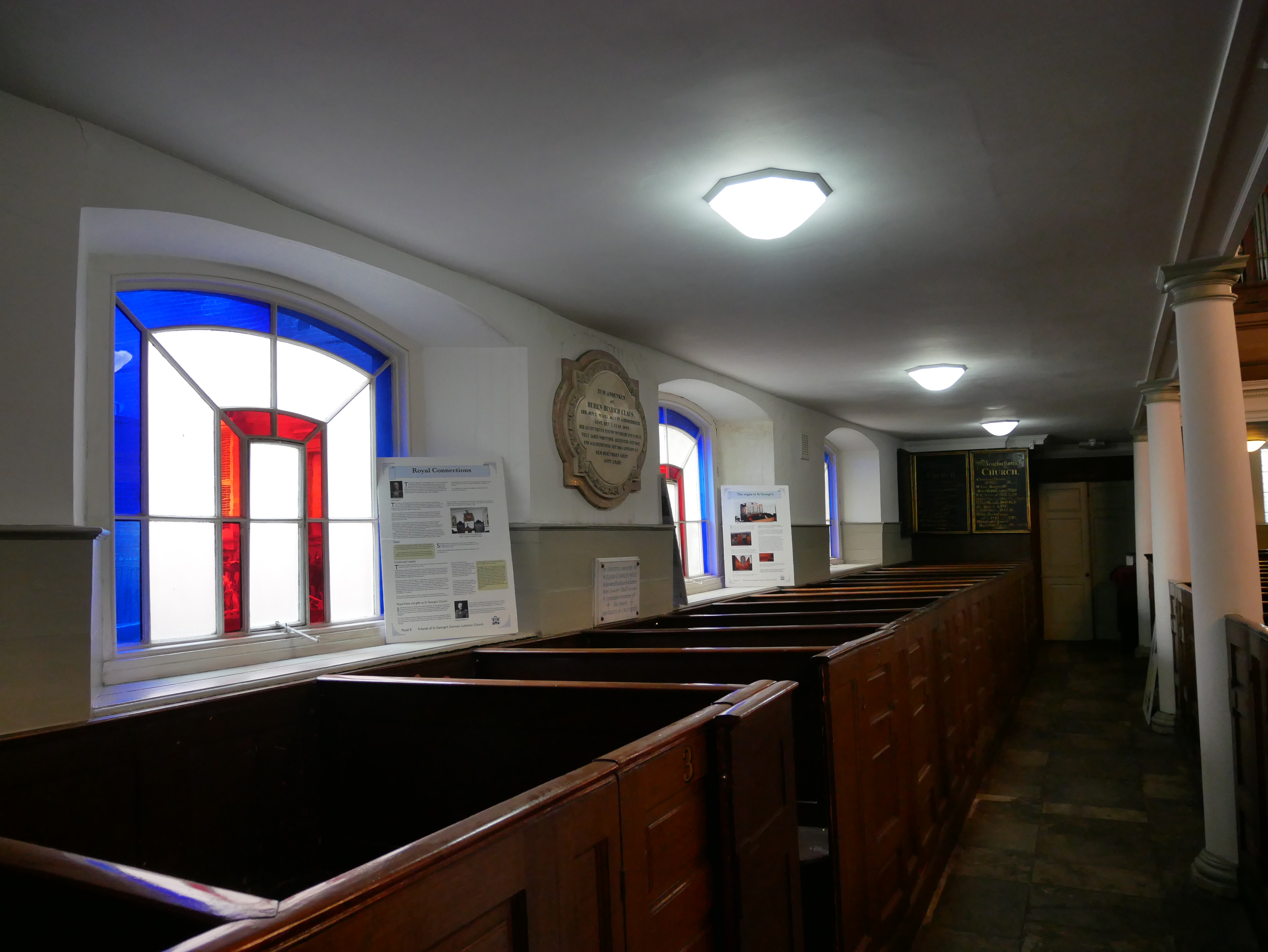
The east aisle of the church

Having fallen out of use by the congregation it was transferred in 1995 in a poor state of repair to the Historic Chapels Trust, who initiated a programme of restoration and repair costing £865,000, generously assisted by the Heritage Lottery Fund, English Heritage and foundations including the St Paul's German Evangelical Reformed Church Trust. Works included re-roofing and delicate stabilisation of the brick walls which were moving out of the vertical. The restoration was supervised by conservation architects Thomas Ford and Partners with structural engineers Alan Baxter Associates.

== Current uses ==
The church is used for worship and the organ continues to be used regularly for services, teaching and the monthly series of Organ Vespers. An active committee of Friends of St George's German Lutheran Church organises monthly talks to give the public access and to raise funds for the maintenance of this historic building. put on public events at the church and welcome new members. The church is available for guided group visits by appointment and has regular open days throughout the year.

Couples eligible to be married in Tower Hamlets may have religious marriages here and ceremonies may be conducted in German, English or Latin.

== St George's Church Library & Parish Records ==
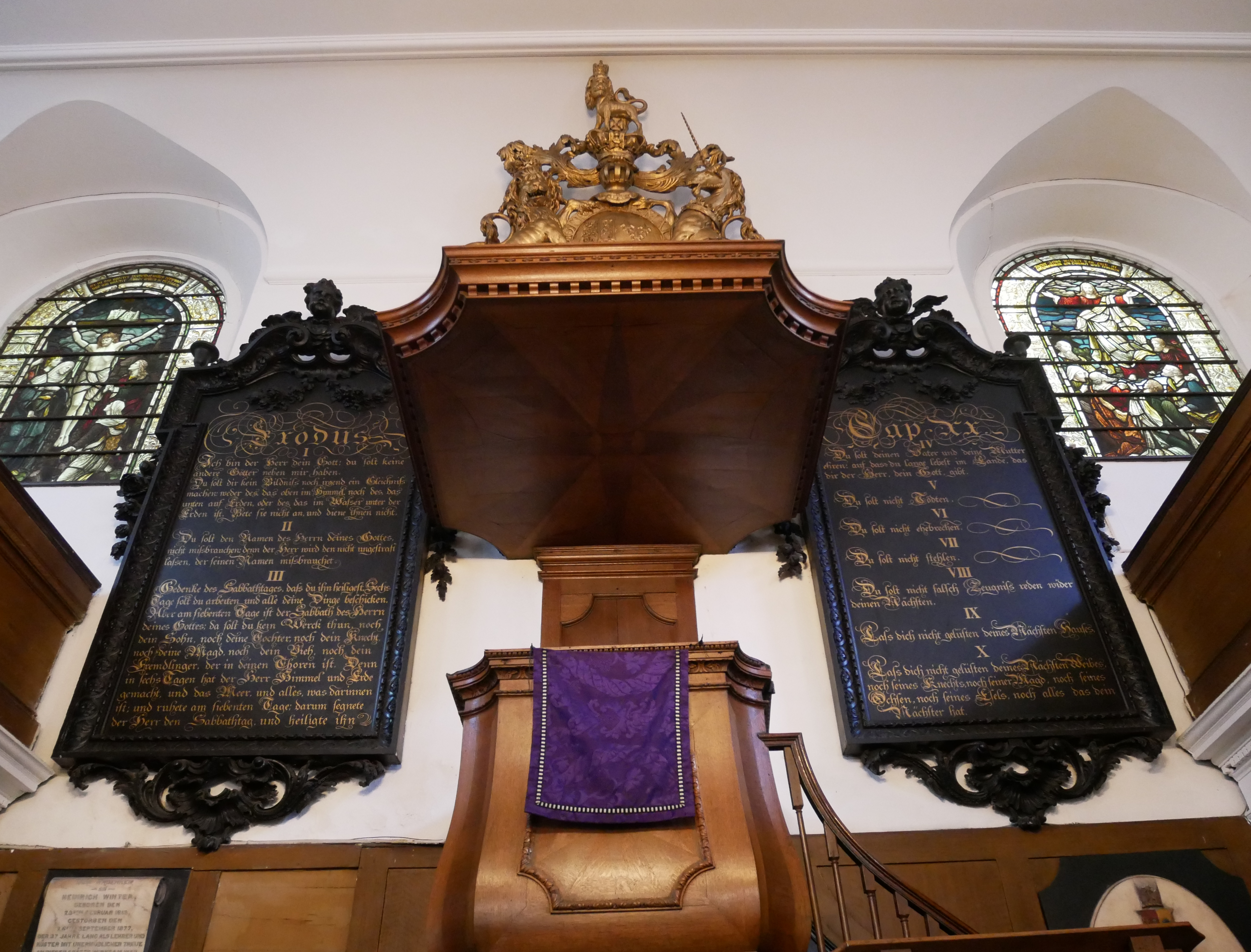
Detail at the north end of the church nave

Gustav Wachsel's collection of books was kept in the vestry and with later additions to the library, came into the care of the Historic Chapels Trust with the building. They amounted to about 750 books, including early eighteenth-century prints of the Waisenhaus in Halle and Gottfried Keller's Seldwyla Folks. In autumn 1995 an unsuccessful attempted theft prompted the transfer of the books to the British Library where they are catalogued as a special collection and available to students.

Books and microfiches available for baptisms 1763 - 1895 and other records of the congregation for family history research are no longer held at the church but may be consulted at Tower Hamlets Local History Library and Archives.

== See also ==
- List of chapels preserved by the Historic Chapels Trust
