= Dissenters' Chapel, Kensal Green =

Part of Kensal Green Cemetery, North Kensington, London

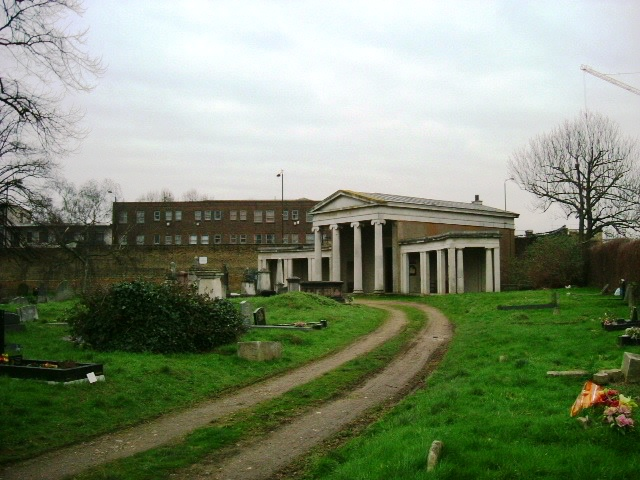
- Dissenters' Chapel, Kensal Green Cemetery

- Location in Greater London
- 51.5269°N 0.2159°W
- OS grid reference: TQ 239 824

History
- Built: 1831–34
- Built for: General Cemetery Company
- Rebuilt: 1997

Site notes
- Architect: John Griffith
- Architectural style: Neoclassical
- Restored by: Historic Chapels Trust
- Governing body: Historic Chapels Trust

Listed Building – Grade II*
- Designated: 15 April 1969

Dissenters' Chapel, Kensal Green, is a working chapel with gallery attached in Kensal Green Cemetery, North Kensington, London. It is recorded in the National Heritage List for England as a designated Grade II* listed building, and is under the care of the Historic Chapels Trust.

== History ==
The chapel was the first purpose-built Nonconformist chapel to be built in a public cemetery. The eastern spur of the cemetery was reserved for the use of dissenters. A competition to build the chapel was won by Henry Edward Kendall, with a design in Gothic style. However the contract was awarded to John Griffith of Finsbury. Griffith was surveyor to the General Cemetery Company, and his design was in Greek Revival style. The chapel was built between 1831 and 1834.

During the Second World War the Chapel suffered severe bomb damage during an air raid. For much of the late half of the 20th century the fabric of the chapel was slowly deteriorating. Its wings were demolished in the early 1970s. By the 1990s the building was "derelict and subject to vandalism".

The building was leased to the Historic Chapels Trust in this poor state to enable a major restoration, completed in 1997. This included rebuilding of the roofless wings, repair of the chapel's main body, and restoration of the historic painting scheme of the interior. A visitor centre was constructed in the north wing. The restoration was supported by generous grants from Historic England and was awarded an Environment Award from the Royal Borough of Kensington and Chelsea in 1997, and in 1998, a Europa Nostra Award.

== Architecture and setting ==
Kensal Green Cemetery is London's oldest public cemetery, dating from 1832. It is a listed at Grade I on the National Register of Historic Parks and Gardens, and is a conservation area. The cemetery contains a large number of listed buildings in addition to the Dissenters' Chapel. The chapel is constructed in Portland stone and rendered brick. At the front is an Ionic tetrastyle portico with a pediment. On each side of the portico are three-bay wings, with paired pilasters along the front, and twin Ionic columns in the antae at the sides. Inside the chapel are modern pews, a pulpit and a reading desk. Along the east wall are pilasters. Under the chapel is a partly sealed catacomb.

== Present-day uses ==
The Historic Chapels Trust surrendered its lease of the chapel in 2025 as part of a dispersal of its assets, caused by the removal of grant aid from Historic England. The chapel is now managed on behalf of the General Cemetery Company by The Friends of Kensal Green Cemetery, who make it available for funerals and organise a programme of art exhibitions, open days, evening lectures, and private events. The chapel forms the conclusion of the tours of the cemetery organised by the Friends.

== See also ==
- List of chapels preserved by the Historic Chapels Trust
