= All Hallows Church, Bardsey =

Coordinates: 53°52′58.7″N 1°26′43.3″W

All Hallows Church
- Church of All Hallows
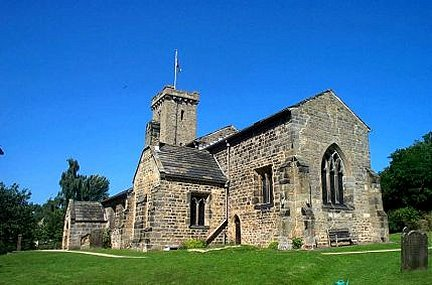
- All Hallows Church
- OS grid reference: SE 36561 43123
- Location: Bardsey, West Yorkshire
- Country: England
- Denomination: Church of England
- Website: www.bardseyekparish.com

History
- Status: Parish Church

Architecture
- Heritage designation: Grade I listed building
- Style: Medieval

Specifications
- Materials: sandstone, rubble, gritstone

Administration
- Province: York
- Diocese: Leeds
- Archdeaconry: Leeds
- Deanery: Allerton
- Parish: Bardsey cum Rigton

All Hallows Church in Bardsey, West Yorkshire, England is an active Anglican parish church in the archdeaconry of Leeds and the Diocese of Leeds.

The Bardsey Millennium Tapestry, created by many people from the village, is hung at the west end of the north wall of the church. The tapestry took nearly five years to complete and was officially unveiled in October 2001.

== History ==
The church was built in the 9th century; its tower is the oldest surviving part from between 850 and 950 AD. The latest restoration was carried out by Charles R. Chorley and Son of Leeds in 1909. The lower parts of the tower and the central nave walls date from the 9th century while the upper parts of the tower date from the 10th century. Between 1000 and 1400 saw the addition of a north and south aisle and the Norman doorway being moved to its present position, however a porch has since been added obscuring much of this doorway.

A north chapel which now serves as a vestry was constructed in 1521 by request of Edmund Mauleverer of Wothersome and he and his son Robert are interred beneath it. A pipe organ was installed in this part of the church in 1868. The south chapel was added during the 19th century for Lord Bingley (after whom the adjacent pub is named after).

There is a war memorial to the Great War and the 'World War'.

== Architectural style ==
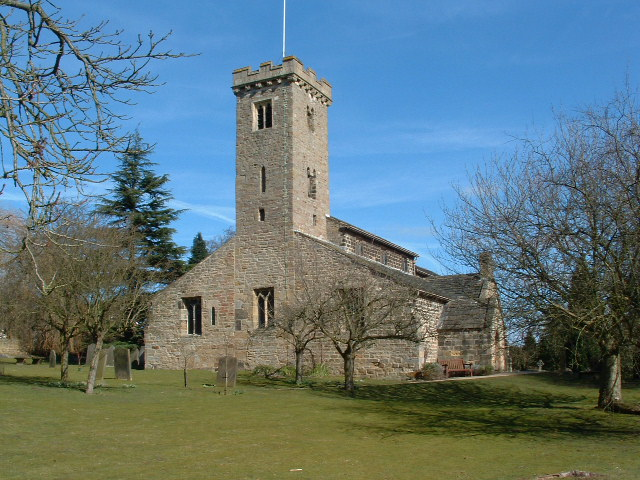
The west elevation and tower

The church has an Anglo-Saxon west tower and the aisles are from the Norman era. The aisles were widened in the 14th century. The north chapel of 1520 is now the vestry and the south chapel of 1724, which was built for the Bayley family, is the choir vestry. The church is built of red sandstone with a coursed rubble tower and harrier-dressed gritstone to the chancel and south transept. The porch is ashlar and the roof of stone slate.

The church has a lychgate to Church Lane.

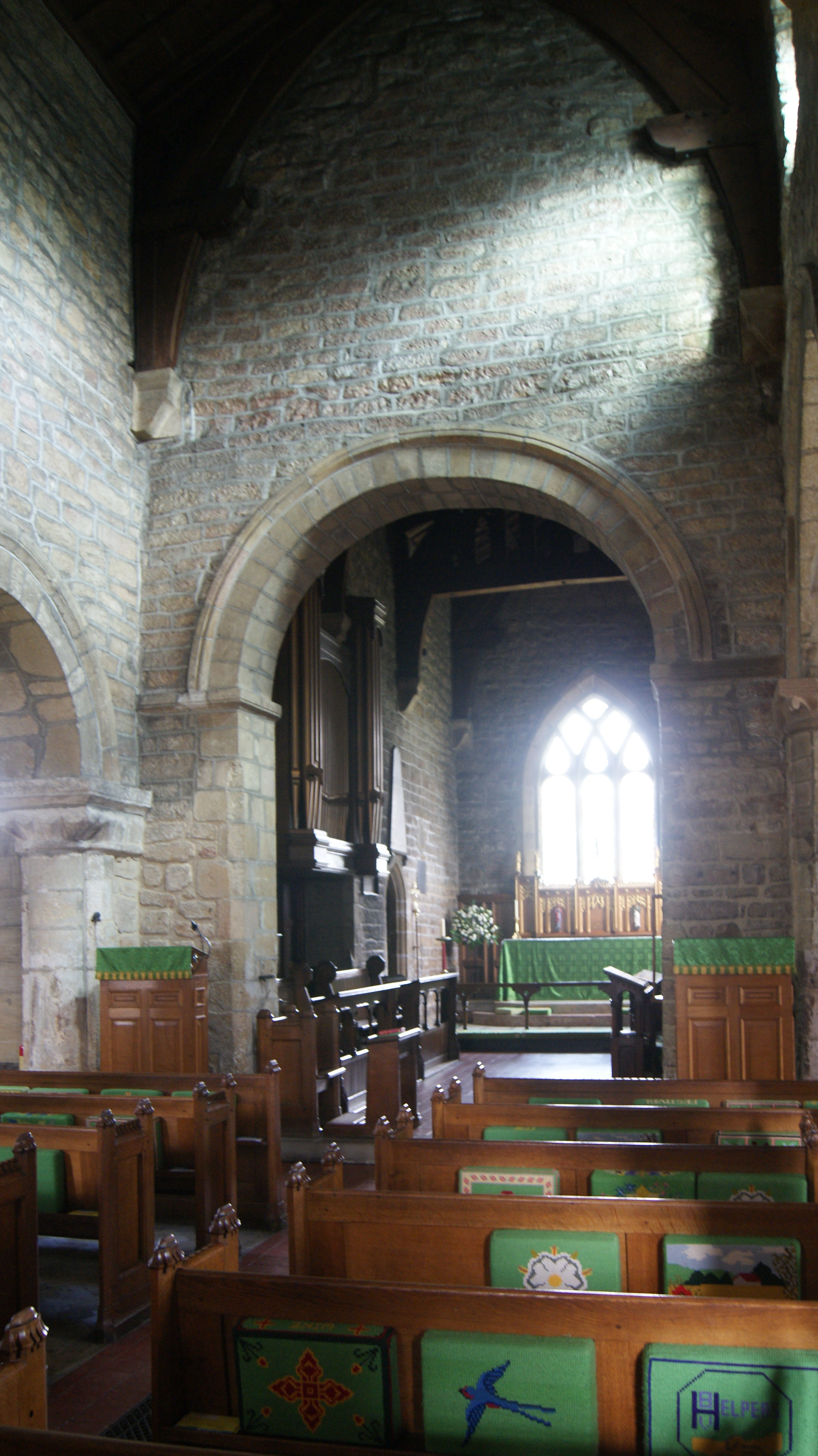
View towards the altar

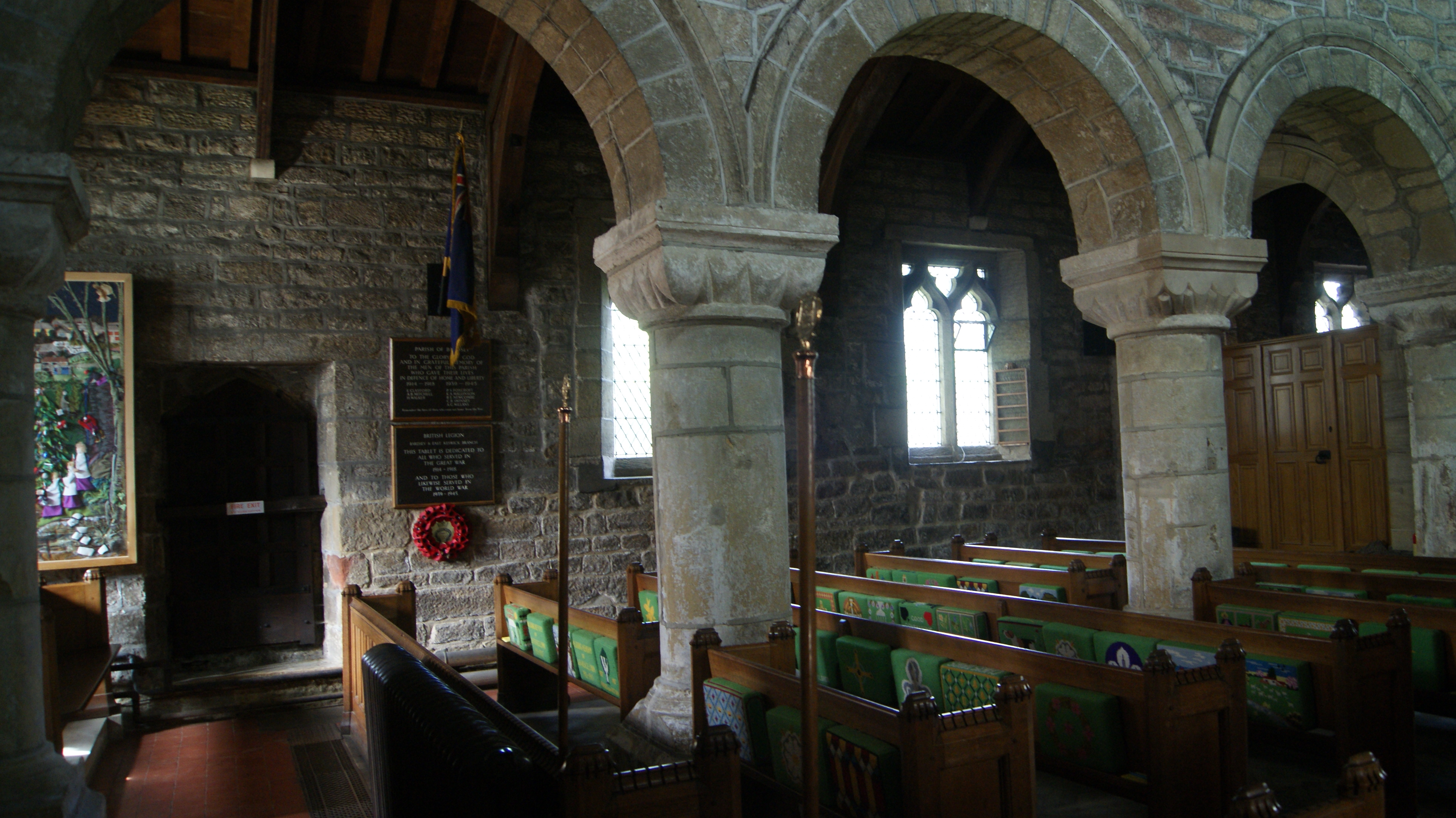
Northern wall

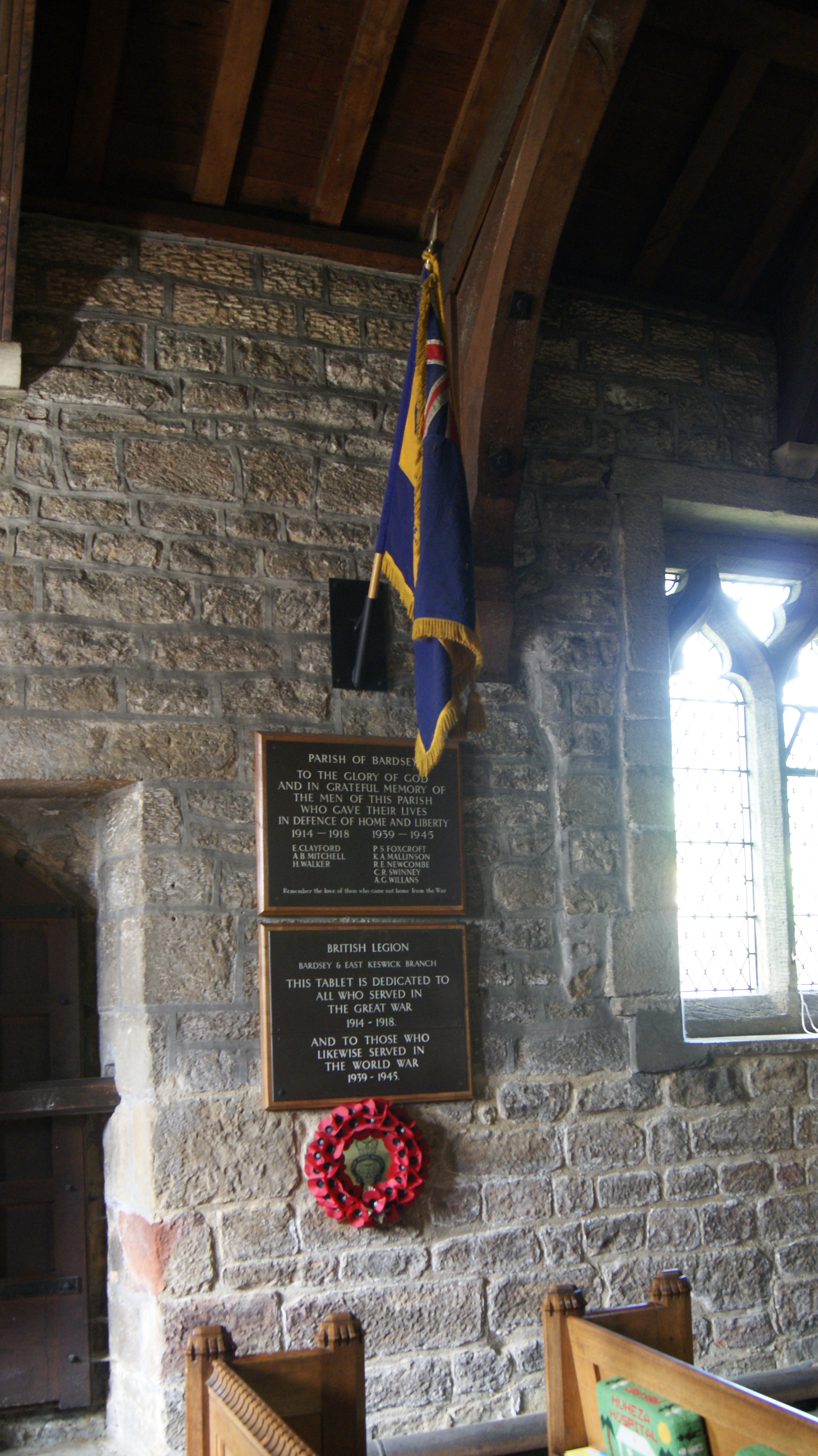
War memorial

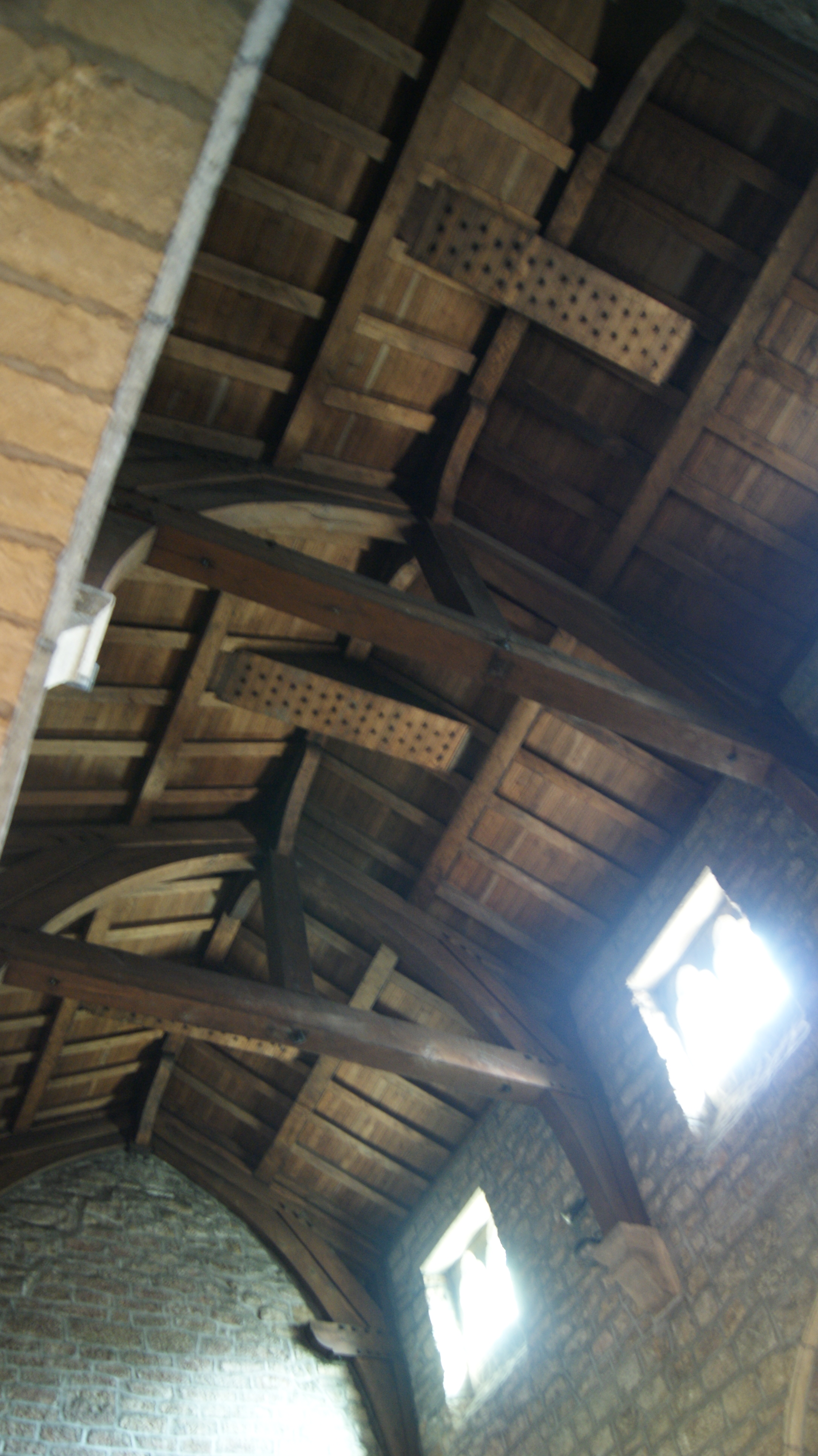
Ceiling

== See also ==
- Grade I listed churches in West Yorkshire
- List of places of worship in the City of Leeds
- Listed buildings in Bardsey cum Rigton
