= Bardsey =

Bardsey may refer to:

- Bardsey Island, Wales
  - Bardsey Lighthouse, on Bardsey Island
- Bardsey, West Yorkshire, England
- Bardsey cum Rigton, West Yorkshire, England

== See also ==
- Bardsea, Cumbria, England
