= Grade I listed churches in West Yorkshire =

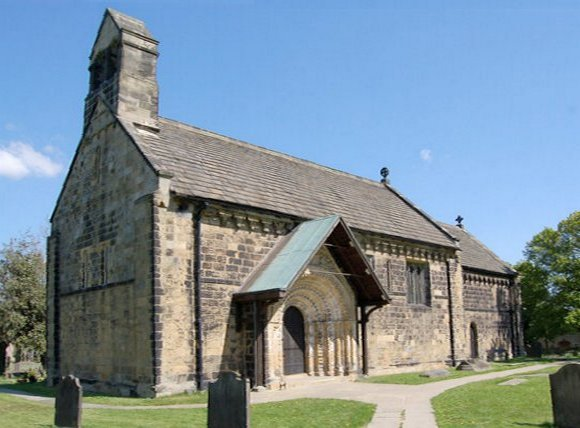
St John the Baptist's Church, Adel

West Yorkshire is a metropolitan county in the Yorkshire and the Humber region of England. Created as a metropolitan county in 1974 after the passage of the Local Government Act 1972, it consists of five metropolitan boroughs, namely the City of Bradford, Calderdale, Kirklees, the City of Leeds and the City of Wakefield. Its area corresponds approximately with the historic West Riding of Yorkshire, and it contains the major towns of Bradford, Dewsbury, Halifax, Huddersfield, Leeds, and Wakefield.

In England, buildings are given listed building status by the Secretary of State for Culture, Media and Sport, acting on the recommendation of English Heritage. This gives the structure national recognition and protection against alteration or demolition without authorisation. Grade I listed buildings are defined as being of "exceptional interest, sometimes considered to be internationally important"; only 2.5 per cent of listed buildings are included in this grade. This is a complete list of Grade I listed ecclesiastical buildings, including cathedrals, churches and chapels, in West Yorkshire as recorded in the National Heritage List for England.

Christian churches have existed in West Yorkshire since the Anglo-Saxon era, and two of the churches in the list have retained elements of Anglo-Saxon architecture, namely All Hallows, Bardsey, and All Saints, Ledsham. Surviving Norman architecture is found in particular in St John the Baptist, Adel, St Oswald, Guiseley, and St Mary, Kippax. Most of the remaining churches in this list are in the Gothic style, dating between the 13th and the 17th centuries. There are four buildings in the list that are largely Neoclassical in style, namely the chapel in Bramham Park, St Peter and St Leonard, Horbury, Holy Trinity, Leeds, and St Peter, Sowerby. Churches built in the 19th century, and in Gothic Revival style, are All Souls, Halifax, St Peter, Leeds, St Saviour, Leeds, and Todmorden Unitarian Church. Also in the list are the Italianate Congregational Church in Saltaire, and, in Modern style, Epiphany Church in Gipton, Leeds. Almost all the churches are part of the Anglican denomination, the exceptions being the Congregational Church in Saltaire, Todmorden Unitarian Church, the Puritan Chapel in Bramhope, and Fulneck Moravian Chapel.

== Churches ==
Name	Location	Photograph	Notes
St Peter	Addingham; 53.9433°N 1.8717°W		During the late 15th century, this church was built to replace an earlier church, and Norman fabric has been re-used inside the tower. The west tower and the wall of the south aisle were rebuilt between 1757 and 1760. The chancel was restored in 1875. Most of the church is in Neoclassical style, other than the north aisle, which is Perpendicular. In the church is the fragment of a Saxon cross.
St John the Baptist	Adel; 53.8576°N 1.5840°W		Nikolaus Pevsner says that this is "one of the best and most complete Norman village churches in Yorkshire". It consists of a nave and a chancel, with a bellcote renewed in 1838–39 by R. D.Chantrell, also restored the roof in 1843. There was a further restoration in 1879. Inside the church, the font has a carved oak canopy of 1921 by Eric Gill.
All Hallows	Almondbury; 53.6318°N 1.7469°W		The chancel dates from the 13th century and is Early English in style, while most of the rest of the church is Perpendicular. The nave roof is dated 1522, and contains a variety of carved bosses. Battlements and pinnacles were added to the west tower in 1872–77. A notable feature inside the church is the Perpendicular font cover, which is 10 feet (3.0 m) high. Some of the windows contain 15th-century stained glass.
St Mary	Badsworth; 53.6292°N 1.3009°W		St Mary's dates mainly from the 15th century and is in Perpendicular style, other than two doorways from the 13th and 14th centuries, and the Decorated chancel windows. There is a Norman capital incorporated into the fabric of the south aisle. Inside the church is a monument to the parliamentarian Sir John Bright who died in 1688.
All Hallows	Bardsey; 53.8830°N 1.4453°W		All Hallows has a slim Anglo-Saxon west tower dating from between 850 and 950, which was raised in the later 10th century. Norman features remain in the west windows of the aisles, the re-set south doorway, and the north aisle arcade. The chancel dates from the early 14th century, the north chapel was built in 1521, and the south (Bayley) chapel was added in about 1724. The church was restored in 1909.
All Saints	Batley; 53.7160°N 1.6359°W		The present church was built in Perpendicular style in about 1485, replacing an earlier church dating from about 1330, and incorporating some of its fabric, including the Decorated south arcade. It has a west tower with a corbelled out parapet, machicolations and battlements. The church was restored in 1872–73 by Walter Hanstock. Inside the church is a monument dating from the end of the 15th century that includes two effigies.
Bradford Cathedral	Bradford; 53.7954°N 1.7477°W		A stone church has existed on the site since at least 1327, and it was rebuilt in the 15th century in Perpendicular style. Changes were made to the church during the 18th and 19th centuries. It was then the parish church of Bradford, and was raised to the status of a cathedral in 1919. After the Second World War, the east end was extended and other alterations were made by Edward Maufe, who also designed the baldacchino. The interior was reordered in 1987 to provide increased seating.
Chapel	Bramham Park; 53.8709°N 1.3815°W		Originally a garden house, this was designed by James Paine for George Fox Lane and built in 1750–62. It was converted into a family chapel in 1907. It is in Neoclassical style, with a four-column Ionic porch, with semi-octagonal wings on each side. Repairs were undertaken in 1958 and in the 1990s.
Puritan Chapel	Bramhope; 53.8879°N 1.6226°W		The chapel was built in 1649 for the Puritans. It is a simple low single-storey building in sandstone with a slate roof. Inside are the original box pews, an octagonal pulpit, and monuments, including one with the effigy of a recumbent female figure. After 1927 the building's fabric deteriorated, but has since been restored, although it was further damaged by a fallen tree in 1962. It is now maintained by a group of Friends.
St Luke and All Saints	Darrington; 53.6759°N 1.2672°W		The west tower has a Norman base with a Perpendicular top. In the body of the church are lancet windows, and other windows have Decorated or Perpendicular tracery. An unusual feature inside the church is an open-arcaded gallery running from the rood turret to the chancel arch. In the chancel are four stalls with misericords. There is some 15th-century stained glass in the north chapel.
St Mary	Elland; 53.6869°N 1.8378°W		Stones in the chancel arch have been dated to about 1170–80, but most of the present church dates from the 13th and 14th centuries. It was restored in 1856 by W. H. Crossland. The stained glass in the east window dates from the 15th century and depicts 21 scenes from the life of St Mary the Virgin. The church has a west tower, and a Sanctus bellcote on the gable of the nave.
St Michael	Emley; 53.6159°N 1.6313°W		The church dates from the 14th century when it was built in Perpendicular style, incorporating Norman material from an earlier church. The large west tower was added in the 15th century. Chapels, box pews and galleries were added during the 17th century. The church was restored in 1874, when the box pews and galleries were removed. It was refurbished in the 2000s, incorporating modern facilities. The font dates from the 17th century, and the pulpit from the following century.
St Peter	Felkirk, South Hiendley; 53.6086°N 1.4167°W		St Peter's dates mainly from the 13th and 15th centuries, but has retained some Norman features, in particular the tower arch. Much of the rest of the church is in Perpendicular style. The west tower is relatively large in comparison with the body of the church; it has an embattled parapet with crocketed pinnacles and gargoyles. At the west end of the north aisle is a blocked leper's window.
Epiphany Church	Gipton, Leeds; 53.8130°N 1.4918°W		Built in 1936–38, this church was designed in modern style with "Gothic allusions" by N. F. Cachemaille-Day, and altered in 1976. It is constructed in concrete with brick cladding, and has tiled roofs. It has transepts, and a chancel with an apse. The windows are very narrow, and the flat ceiling is supported by tall concrete columns.
St Oswald	Guiseley; 53.8751°N 1.7063°W		St Oswald's dates from the late 11th or early 12th century, and contains a Norman south doorway and south arcade. Additions and alterations were made in the 13th and 15th centuries. In 1909 Sir Charles Nicholson rebuilt the nave, chancel, and north aisle in a Perpendicular style matching that of the north arcade. Inside the church are three fragments of a Saxon cross that have been dated to the 9th century.
All Souls	Halifax; 53.7304°N 1.8628°W		All Souls was built in 1856 for the industrialist Edward Akroyd. It has a cruciform plan, is in Gothic Revival style, and was designed by George Gilbert Scott. The church is now redundant and is in the care of the Churches Conservation Trust.
St John the Baptist (Halifax Minster, formerly Halifax Parish Church)	Halifax; 53.7232°N 1.8538°W		This church was built in the early 15th century, replacing an earlier church, fragments of which have been incorporated in the north aisle. The rest of the church is in Perpendicular style. Restoration was started in 1878 by George Gilbert Scott and completed after his death by his son John Oldrid Scott. Inside the church are 15th-century misericords, 16th-century screens, and wall memorials from the 17th and 18th centuries.
All Saints	Harewood; 53.9003°N 1.5240°W		Standing in the grounds of Harewood House, the church dates from the 15th century and is mainly Perpendicular in style. Additions were made in 1793, and the church was restored in 1862–63 by George Gilbert Scott. It contains an impressive collection of six medieval monuments containing effigies, dating from the 15th century. The church is redundant and is under the care of the Churches Conservation Trust.
St Peter and St Leonard	Horbury; 53.6610°N 1.5548°W		The church was built in 1791–93. It was designed and paid for by John Carr, who was born in the town and buried in the church. The church is in Neoclassical style. At the west end is a tower with four stages of diminishing size, surmounted by a rotunda with a small conical spire. On the south side is a portico, with four Ionic columns supporting a pediment. Inside the church is a west gallery carried on Tuscan columns, and the bays are separated by Corinthian pilasters.
St Mary	Kippax; 53.7676°N 1.3692°W		This is a mainly Norman church with much use of herringbone masonry. It has a west tower, the top of which is Perpendicular. The north vestry was added in 1875, and the tower was restored in 1892–93 by George Fowler Jones. Inside the church is a fragment of an Anglo-Saxon cross-shaft that has been dated to the 10th century.
All Hallows	Kirkburton; 53.6087°N 1.7023°W		The nave, chancel, and south aisle date from about 1200, and contain lancet windows. The west tower is Perpendicular in style, and has a re-set Early English west doorway. The north aisle was rebuilt in 1825. Inside the church are fragments of a Saxon cross. The font has an elaborate cover designed by Sir Charles Nicholson, dating from about 1930.
All Saints	Ledsham; 53.7623°N 1.3090°W		This is basically a Saxon church, with Norman and Perpendicular additions. The church was restored in 1871. The base of the tower, with its south doorway, and the chancel arch are Saxon; the upper part of the tower, and the arch between the tower and the nave are Norman. Among the Perpendicular additions are the battlements and pinnacles on the tower, and the recessed spire. In the church are monuments, the earliest dated 1662, incorporating effigies, some recumbent, some standing.
Holy Trinity	Leeds; 53.7962°N 1.5436°W		Holy Trinity was built in 1721–27 in Neoclassical style. The upper part of the tower was added in 1839 by R. D.Chantrell after the previous wooden spire had been blown down. The church is characterised by doors with Gibbs surrounds, and an apse with a Venetian window. Inside the church are Corinthian columns supporting the ceiling.
St John the Evangelist	Leeds; 53.8001°N 1.5423°W		The church was built in 1634–36 for the wool merchant John Harrison, altered in 1830–38, and restored by Norman Shaw in 1866–68. It is Perpendicular in style, and most of its fittings are Jacobean. The church was declared redundant in 1975, and is under the care of the Churches Conservation Trust.
St Peter (Leeds Minster, formerly Leeds Parish Church)	Leeds; 53.7952°N 1.5360°W		The church was built in 1839–41 for its vicar Dr W Hook, and designed by R. D.Chantrell. Alterations were made to the east end in 1870–80. It has a tower in the centre of the north side, through which the church is entered; the nave and chancel on each side of the tower are equal in length. and there are long galleries. Also in the church is the memorial tomb of Dr Hook, designed by George Gilbert Scott.
St Saviour	Leeds; 53.7919°N 1.5266°W		A Gothic Revival church designed by John Macduff Derick and built in 1842–45, it was an important influence in the work of the Oxford Movement outside London. A chapel named after Edward Pusey was added in 1890 by G. F. Bodley. The church contains four stained glass windows designed by A. W. N. Pugin.
St Oswald	Methley; 53.7345°N 1.4087°W		St Oswald's dates from the 14th and 15th centuries, with restorations and alterations in the 19th and early 20th centuries. The chancel was rebuilt in 1926. It is mainly in Perpendicular style, with a west tower, and a south aisle. The timber roof is carried on stone corbels carved with angels carrying the Instruments of the Passion. In the church is a collection of monuments, the earliest of which dates from the 15th century and incorporates alabaster effigies under a crocketed canopy.
St Michael and Our Lady	Nostell Park; 53.6506°N 1.3846°W		The church dates from 1533, and is in Perpendicular style. It has a west tower with an embattled parapet and crocketed pinnacles. Inside the church is a cylindrical Norman font with zigzag decoration that was moved from the abandoned village of Auburn. There is also a monument to Sir Rowland Wynn, who died in 1806, by John Flaxman.
All Saints	Otley; 53.7345°N 1.4087°W		A church existed on the site in the Anglo-Saxon era, but the earliest fabric in the present church is Norman; this is found in the north doorway, and in windows in the chancel. Much of the rest of the church is in the Decorated and Perpendicular styles, and the south porch is Georgian. In the church are 17 fragments of Anglo-Saxon carved stones.
Fulneck Moravian Chapel	Pudsey, Leeds; 53.7838°N 1.6644°W		Built in 1746–48, the chapel forms part of a settlement of the Moravian Church. On each side was accommodation for the brothers and sisters of the movement. This was later linked to the chapel, and has more recently been used as a school. A cupola stands on the gable over the entrance to the chapel.
United Reformed Church	Saltaire, Bradford; 53.8391°N 1.7909°W		The church was built in 1858–59 for Titus Salt, and was designed by Lockwood and Mawson. It is in Italianate style with a semicircular portico surmounted by a circular tower at the west end, and a domed family mausoleum, and an apse at the east end. Inside the church, the bays are divided by Corinthian pilasters.
All Saints	South Kirkby; 53.5942°N 1.3172°W		Most of the church dates from the 15th century, with 13th-century nave arcades, and its external appearance is Perpendicular. The west tower is in four stages, its lower part being constructed in sandstone and the upper parts in limestone. At its summit is an embattled parapet with gargoyles and eight crocketed pinnacles. Inside the church are monuments dating from the 17th and 18th centuries.
St Peter	Sowerby; 53.7052°N 1.9365°W		St Peter's was built in 1763–66, and designed by John Wilson. It is in Neoclassical style, with a west tower and an apse at the east end. Along the sides are two tiers of windows, those on the lower tier being round-headed, and those above being rectangular. Inside the church are three galleries carried on Corinthian columns. At the east end is a Venetian window. The monuments include one to John Tillotson, who was born locally and became Archbishop of Canterbury.
St Michael and All Angels	Thornhill; 53.6656°N 1.6180°W		A church has existed on the site since the Saxon era, and is mentioned in the Domesday Book. The oldest parts of the present church, including the west tower, date from the 15th century, with the Savile (north) Chapel built in 1447, and the south chapel and chancel added in 1490. The nave was rebuilt in 1777, and rebuilt again in 1877–79 by G. E. Street when he restored the church; he also added the south porch and vestry. In the Savile Chapel is stained glass from the 15th century. Also in this chapel are Anglo-Saxon carved stones, and tombs, the earliest dating from the 14th century.
Unitarian Church	Todmorden; 53.7111°N 2.0990°W		This church was built between 1865 and 1869 for the sons of the cotton manufacturer and philanthropist John Fielden. It was designed by John Gibson in Gothic Revival style. It has a large steeple on its ritual south side. Due to declining congregations at the time, the church closed in 1994 and came under the care of the Historic Chapels Trust. However, since 2008, services have resumed and it has been used since.
St James	Tong, Bradford; 53.7708°N 1.6690°W		The church was built in 1727 near Tong Hall as an estate church to replace an earlier church on the site. It has retained parts of a Norman, and a Perpendicular window, but is otherwise in Neoclassical style. Inside the church, the arcade is supported by Tuscan columns. The original furnishings are still present, including a west gallery, box pews, pews for the squire and the parson, and a three-decker pulpit.
Wakefield Cathedral	Wakefield; 53.6830°N 1.4969°W		Formerly a parish church dedicated to All Saints, the church was elevated to the status of a cathedral in 1888. Its spire, at about 247 feet (75 m), is the highest in Yorkshire. The oldest fabric, dating from about 1150, is in the north nave arcade, and the west steeple was built between 1409 and 1420. Repairs and restoration of the church took place between 1857 and 1874, commenced by George Gilbert Scott and completed by his son, John Oldrid Scott. In 1888 plans for rebuilding the east end were prepared by J. Loughborough Pearson; he started the work, and it was completed by his son Frank in 1905. Inside the cathedral are carved choirstalls with misericords dating from the late 15th century, stained glass in 23 windows by Kempe, figures on the rood screen by Ninian Comper (1938), and the cathedra by George Pace (1974).
St Mary's Chapel	Wakefield; 53.6767°N 1.4894°W		The chapel stands on the east side of Wakefield Bridge, and is one of only four surviving bridge chapels in England. It dates from about 1350, but has been much repaired and altered since. Its west front is a copy of the original, which is now in Kettlethorpe Hall. The chapel is in Decorated style, with octagonal pinnacles on its corners. It has tall parapets that are decorated with reliefs in panels depicting biblical scenes. Inside the chapel is a piscina with a crocketed ogee-shaped head.
St Mary	Whitkirk, Leeds; 53.7973°N 1.4497°W		Built in the 15th century in Perpendicular style, the church was restored in 1855–56, the chancel was rebuilt in 1901 by G. F. Bodley, and the church was re-ordered in 1990. Among the monuments is one to John Smeaton who was born in the parish and buried in the church; his works included the third Eddystone Lighthouse, and this is depicted on his monument.
St Peter	Woolley; 53.6127°N 1.5187°W		St Peter's dates mainly from the 15th century, and is in Perpendicular style. The south aisle was added in the 16th century. In 1871 the church was re-ordered and restored by J. Loughborough Pearson. This included replacing box pews with benches, removing the west gallery, and installing a new pulpit, font, and windows. In the doorway to the rood loft is a re-set 12th-century tympanum.
