= John Whittington =

John Whittington may refer to:

- John Whittington (screenwriter), American screenwriter
- John Whittington (cricketer) (1837–?), English cricketer

== See also ==
- Joan Whittington, English Red Cross aid worker
