= East Rigton =

Hamlet in West Yorkshire, England

Coordinates: 53.888°N 1.438°W

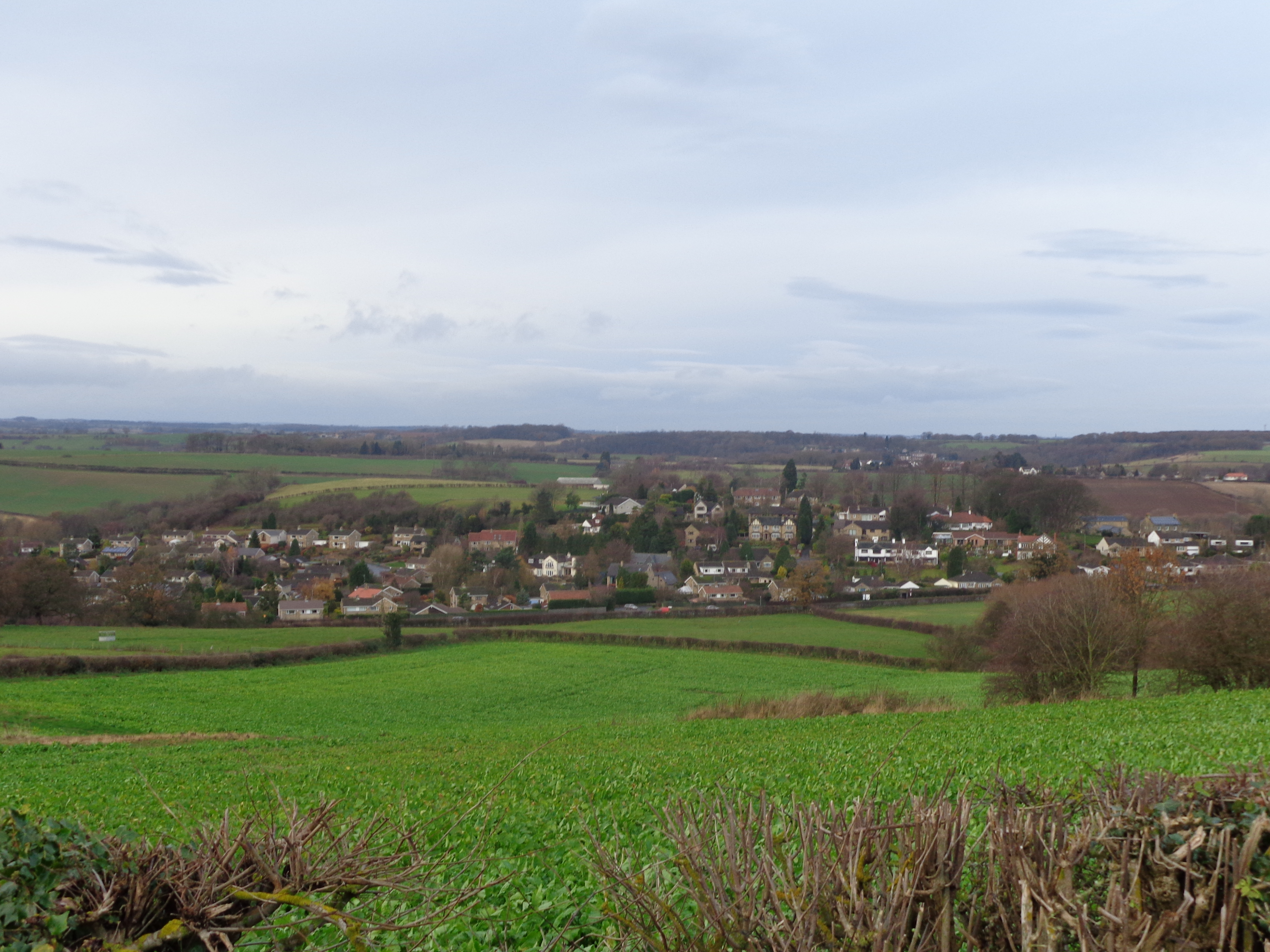
- East Rigton seen from a hill east of Bardsey

- Location within West Yorkshire
- Civil parish: Bardsey cum Rigton
- Shire county: West Yorkshire
- Region: Yorkshire and the Humber
- Country: England
- Sovereign state: United Kingdom

East Rigton is a hamlet in West Yorkshire, England, immediately to the east of Bardsey.

== Etymology ==
The name of East Rigton is first attested in the Domesday Book, as Riston, Ritone, and Ritun. The name comes from the Old Norse word hryggr ('ridge'), which had come into more general use in Old English, and the straightforwardly Old English word tūn ('farmstead, estate'). The additional element east is first attested in 1530, in the form Est Ryghton.

== See also ==
- Listed buildings in Bardsey cum Rigton
