= Listed buildings in Bardsey cum Rigton =

Bardsey cum Rigton is a civil parish in the metropolitan borough of the City of Leeds, West Yorkshire, England. It contains 16 listed buildings that are recorded in the National Heritage List for England. Of these, one is listed at Grade I, the highest of the three grades, and the others are at Grade II, the lowest grade. The parish contains the villages of Bardsey, and East Rigton, and is otherwise rural. The most important listed building is All Hallows Church which contains Anglo-Saxon material, and is listed at Grade I. The other listed buildings consist of houses and cottages, farmhouses and farm buildings, a sundial in the churchyard, a public house, and a milestone.

== Key ==
Grade	Criteria
I	Buildings of exceptional interest, sometimes considered to be internationally important
II	Buildings of national importance and special interest

== Buildings ==
Name and location	Photograph	Date	Notes	Grade
All Hallows Church; 53.88304°N 1.44531°W		9th to 10th century	The lower part of the tower and part of the nave wall are Anglo-Saxon, the north aisle is Norman, and later parts include the chancel dating from the 14th century, and a family pew (later a vestry) added in about 1724. The church is built in red sandstone and gritstone, and has stone slate roofs. It consists of a nave with a clerestory, north and south aisles, a south porch, north and south vestries, a chancel, and a west tower embraced by the aisles. The tower is slender, and has a two-light Perpendicular window, and above are two lancet windows, Perpendicular bell windows, a north clock face, and an embattled parapet with a corbel table.	I
Barn west of Rigton Farmhouse; 53.88730°N 1.43375°W	—	Mid 16th century (probable)	A barn or cowhouse, it is timber framed and encased in stone, with quoins and a stone slate roof. There are four bays, and it contains a cart entry with a wooden lintel, a doorway, and four windows.	II
Two barns, Hill Top Farm; 53.87945°N 1.44951°W	—	Late 16th century (possible)	The barns are in stone, with roofs of stone slate and pantiles, and form two four-bay ranges at right angles. The western barn has quoins, a roof with a coped gable and kneelers, and it contains a tall cart entry, and blocked pitching holes and triangular vents. The northern barn contains a segmental-arched cart entry with composite jambs and voussoirs, doorways, and a glazed pitching hole.	II
Oak Tree Cottage; 53.88220°N 1.44797°W	—	Late 16th century	The house, which was extended to the rear in the 19th century, is in rendered and pebbledashed stone, with exposed timber framing in the upper floor on the south front, and a brown tile roof. There are two storeys, three bays, and a rear extension. The central doorway has an architrave, to the left is a cross casement window, and the other windows on the front are horizontally-sliding sashes. In the extension is a similar sash window, a half-dormer, and canted bay windows in the upper floor.	II
Ghyll Cottage; 53.88280°N 1.44662°W	—	Mid to late 17th century	The house, which incorporates some earlier timber framing and has since been altered, is in stone with a stone slate roof. There are two storeys, three bays, and a projecting single-storey extension on the left. The windows are mullioned, on the front facing the garden is a porch, and at the rear facing the road is a central doorway converted into a window, and horizontally-sliding sash windows.	II
Child's Farm Barn; 53.88142°N 1.45456°W	—	Late 17th to early 18th century	A stone barn with quoins and a roof of Welsh slate at the rear, pantiles at the front, and stone slate on the aisle. There are two storeys, five bays and a full-length aisle, and a range of single-storey farm buildings at right angles. The barn contains a central cart entry on both fronts, windows, and a former hayloft door.	II
Bardsey Grange, Congreve Cottage and wall 53.88552°N 1.44300°W	—	1717	A large farmhouse, possibly incorporating earlier material, it was extended in the 18th century, and has been divided. It is in stone, partly rendered, with quoins and a red tile roof. There are two storeys and a T-shaped plan, consisting of a five-bay range and a rear wing. Most of the windows are sashes with architraves. Attached to the rear wing is a wall containing a gateway.	II
Bardsey Lodge; 53.87890°N 1.45258°W	—	1729	The house is in stone with a plinth at the rear, quoins, and a stone slate roof with a coped gable and kneelers on the right. There are two storeys and four bays. The doorway has monolithic jambs, and to the right is a blocked doorway with an initialled and dated lintel. The windows are sashes with architraves. At the rear is a porch and a doorway with monolithic jambs, a fanlight, and a moulded cornice.	II
Bingley Arms; 53.88160°N 1.44837°W		1738	The public house, which was later extended, is in stone with quoins, rectangular gutter brackets, and a stone slate roof. There are two storeys, a basement at the rear, four bays, and an added bay on the left. The original doorway is blocked, it has a lintel with a false keystone, and above it is a datestone. There is an inserted doorway, and the windows are mullioned with four lights. At the rear are sash windows and a stair window.	II
Sundial; 53.88291°N 1.44535°W	—	1751	The sundial is in the churchyard of All Hallows Church to the south of the porch. It is in stone and has a base of two steps, a pillar swept at the top to a square head with initials and the date. On the top is a circular copper dial engraved with a depiction of Father Time, and the maker's name.	II
Barn and outbuilding, Bardsey Grange; 53.88570°N 1.44340°W	—	Late 18th century	The barn is in stone with a stone slate roof. It has two storeys and eight bays, and contains a tall segmental-arched cart entry with voussoirs, slit vents, and doorways and windows with keyed lintels. The cart sheds are at right angles, and are in brick with a pantile roof.	II
East Rigton Farmhouse; 53.88878°N 1.43391°W	—	1781	The farmhouse, which was later extended, is in stone with quoins, paired shaped gutter brackets, and a stone slate roof. There are two storeys and four bays. The doorway has pilasters and a fanlight, and the windows are sashes with architraves.	II
Cowhouse and granary, Bardsey Grange; 53.88557°N 1.44369°W	—	c. 1800	The cowhouse with granary above are in sandstone with quoins and a stone slate roof. There are two storeys, on the front are four doorways with tie-stone jambs and deep lintels, four upper floor windows, and smaller windows elsewhere. At the rear is a segmental-arched cart entry, and in the left return are steps leading to a doorway in the upper floor.	II
Smallfield Cottage; 53.88219°N 1.44815°W	—	c. 1800	A stone cottage that has a roof of Welsh blue slate and pantiles, and coped gables with kneelers. There are two storeys, two bays, and a lean-to extension on the left. The central doorway and the windows have lintels with carved false voussoirs; in the ground floor the windows are horizontally-sliding sash windows, and the upper floor contains casement windows.	II
Mizpah Cottage; 53.88925°N 1.43502°W	—	Early 19th century	A stone cottage with a red tile roof, a single storey, two bays, and a recessed outshut on the right with a flat roof. In the front is a porch, and the windows have deep lintels and projecting sills.	II
Milestone; 53.89406°N 1.43365°W		Mid 19th century (probable)	The milestone is on the southeast side of Wetherby road (A58 road). It is in stone overlaid with cast iron, and has a triangular plan and a rounded top. On the top is inscribed "LEEDS & COLLINGHAM ROAD" and "RIGTON CUM BARDSEY", and on the sides are the distances to Collingham, Leeds, Wetherby, and York.	II
