= St Peter's Church, Addingham =

Anglican church in Addingham, West Yorkshire, England

St Peter's Church
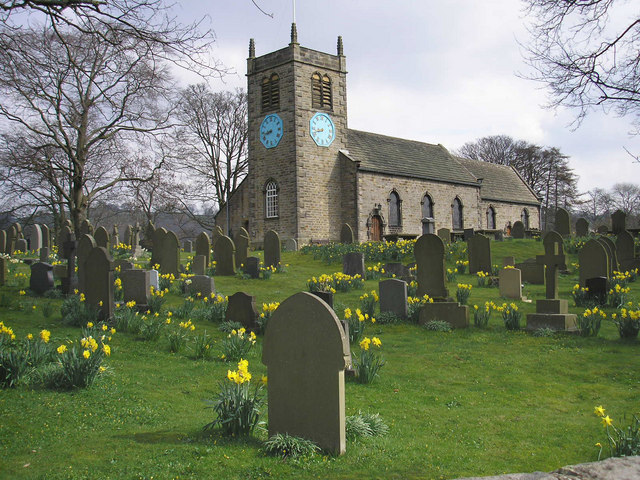
- St Peter's Church
- 53.9433°N 1.8717°W
- OS grid reference: SE 08522 49696
- Location: Church Street, Addingham, West Yorkshire, LS29 0QS
- Country: England
- Denomination: Church of England
- Churchmanship: Central

History
- Status: Active
- Dedication: St Peter

Architecture
- Functional status: Parish church

Administration
- Diocese: Diocese of Leeds
- Deanery: Archdeaconry of Bradford
- Parish: Addingham

St Peter's Church is a Church of England parish church in Addingham, West Yorkshire. It is a Grade I listed building, with the main structure dating to a 15th-century rebuild but with some of the earliest parts dating from the Norman period.

== History ==
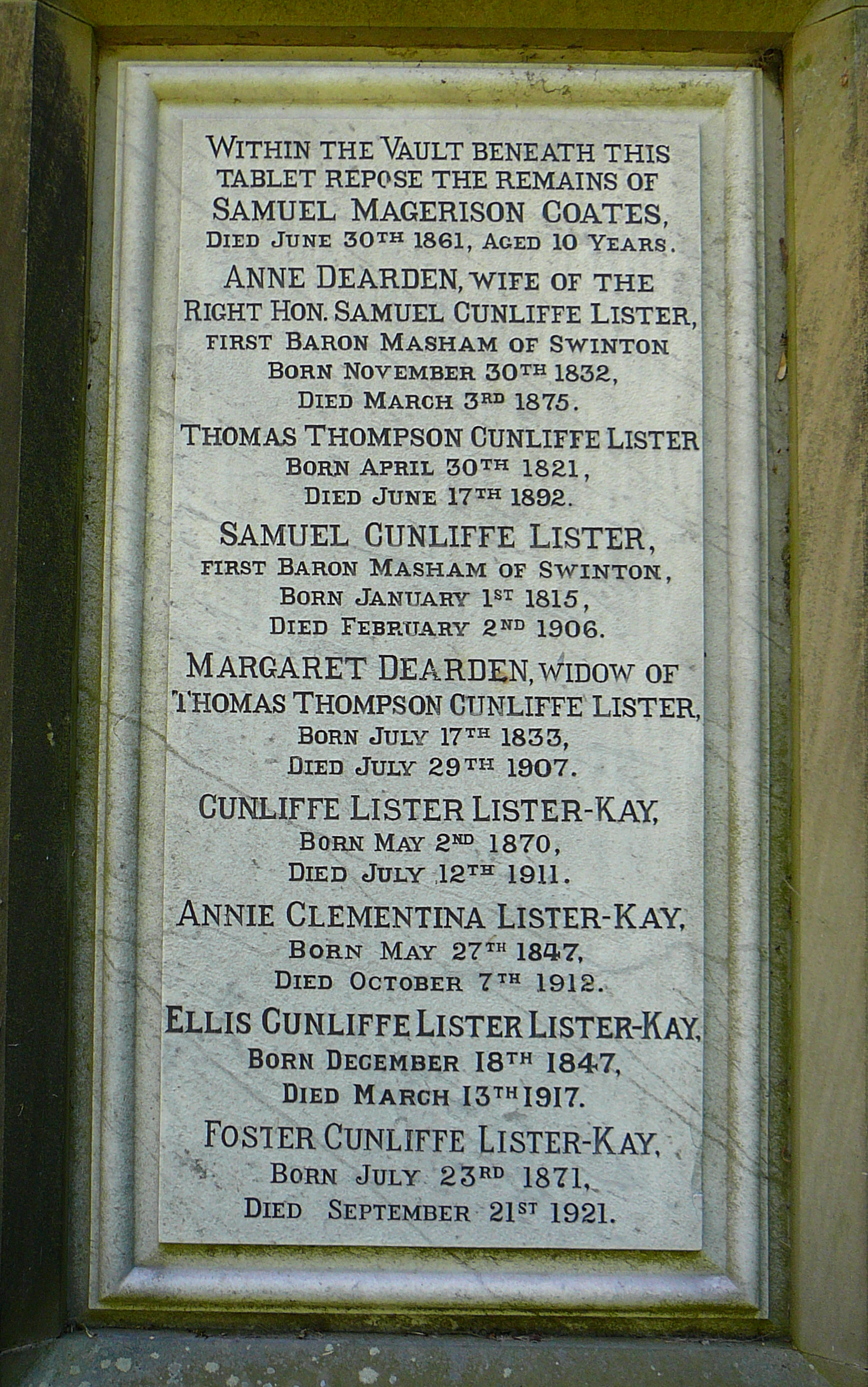
Memorial plaque of Samuel Lister, 1st Baron Masham and family

During the late 15th century, this church was built to replace an earlier church, and Norman fabric has been re-used inside the tower. The west tower and the wall of the south aisle were rebuilt between 1757 and 1760. The chancel was restored in 1875. Most of the church is in Neoclassical style, other than the north aisle, which is Perpendicular. In the church is the fragment of a Saxon cross.

== See also ==
- Grade I listed churches in West Yorkshire
- Listed buildings in Addingham
