= Listed buildings in Addingham =

Addingham is a civil parish in the metropolitan borough of the City of Bradford, West Yorkshire, England. It contains 120 listed buildings that are recorded in the National Heritage List for England. Of these, three are listed at Grade I, the highest of the three grades, one is at Grade II*, the middle grade, and the others are at Grade II, the lowest grade. The parish contains the village of Addingham and the surrounding countryside, including the area of Addingham Moorside to the south.

In the northern part of the parish is the country house of Farfield Hall, which is listed, together with a number of associated structures. Nearby is a Friends' Meeting house, which is also listed together with associated buildings. Most of the listed buildings in the village are houses and cottages, and the other listed buildings include churches and structures in churchyards, public houses, a footbridge and a road bridge, a school converted into a library, former mills, and a boundary stone. In the surrounding area are listed farmhouses and farm buildings, and both parts contain listed milestones and telephone kiosks.

== Key ==
Grade	Criteria
I	Buildings of exceptional interest, sometimes considered to be internationally important
II*	Particularly important buildings of more than special interest
II	Buildings of national importance and special interest

== Buildings ==
Name and location	Photograph	Date	Notes	Grade
St Peter's Church; 53.94330°N 1.87162°W		15th century	The church incorporates some Norman material, the tower and part of the body of the church were rebuilt in 1757, and the chancel was restored in 1875. The church is built in stone with a stone slate roof, the north aisle is in Perpendicular style, and the rest of the church is Classical. It consists of a nave, a north aisle, a chancel, a vestry, and a west tower. The tower has two stages, a west window with a round-arched head, an impost and a keystone, clock faces on two sides, and a parapet with corner crocketed pinnacles. There are two doorways with Gibbs surrounds and triple keystones.	I
Upper Gatecroft Farmhouse and barn 53.92534°N 1.88154°W	—	Late 16th century	The barn was added and the house was extended and altered later. The building is in stone with quoins and a stone slate roof with coped gables and kneelers. The house has two storeys, a main range of two bays, and a kitchen wing at right angles. On the front, the porch projects under a catslide roof, and contains a doorway with a chamfered surround and a quoined lintel. The inner doorway has a depressed Tudor arched lintel with sunken spandrels and a chamfered surround. The windows are mullioned with some mullions removed. The barn has aisles and projects forward, and it contains a porch over the cart entry, and doorways with composite jambs.	II
The Manor House; 53.94457°N 1.88366°W	—	Late 16th or early 17th century	The house, which was extended to the rear in the 19th century, is in stone, with quoins and a stone slate roof. There are two storeys, three bays, and a rear wing and outshut. The original doorway has a depressed Tudor arch with sunken spandrels. This doorway and the doorway inserted in the 18th century have chamfered surrounds. The windows are mullioned.	II
Street House and Cottage; 53.94272°N 1.89841°W	—	Early 17th century	The cottage was added in the 18th century. The building isn stone with quoins, a stone slate roof with coped gables and kneelers, and two storeys with a rear outshut. The windows are mullioned, and there is an inserted Frendh window. The doorway at the rear has monolithic jambs, and in the angle is a segmental bow.	II
Footbridge; 53.94256°N 1.87173°W		17th century (possible)	The bridge carries a footpath leading to St Peter's Church over Town Beck. It is in stone, and consists of a single segmental arch. The bridge has a low parapet with large copings ramping up to a central point.	II
Ghyll House; 53.92654°N 1.88604°W	—	Mid 17th century	The farmhouse, which was altered and extended later, is in stone with quoins, and a stone slate roof with a coped gable and kneelers. There are two storeys and three bays. The doorways on the front and at the rear have monolithic jambs, on the front is a 20th-century porch, and the windows are mullioned.	II
Hardwick House Farmhouse and barn 53.92229°N 1.86863°W	—	17th century	The house and barn are in stone, with quoins, and stone slate roofs with coped gables and kneelers. The barn is the earlier, the house dating from the 19th century. The barn has a doorway with a chamfered surround, composite jambs, and a deep lintel. It has a porch, an added aisle with a doorway, and another doorway at the right end. The house has two storeys, two bays, a central doorway with monolithic jambs, and sash windows.	II
Lower Gate Croft; 53.93091°N 1.87498°W	—	Mid 17th century	The house, which was altered in about 1745, is in stone with quoins and a stone slate roof. There are two storeys, four bays, and a rear outshut. The original doorway has a chamfered surround, composite jambs, a Tudor arched lintel and sunken spandrels. The later central doorway has monolithic jambs. Some of the windows are mullioned, and the later windows are sashes.	II
Ye Olde Stone House; 53.92379°N 1.87177°W	—	17th century	The house, later used for other purposes, is in stone with quoins and a stone slate roof. There are two storeys and two bays. The doorway has a chamfered surround, composite jambs, and a deep lintel. The windows are mullioned and some mullions have been removed.	II
Library; 53.94463°N 1.88484°W		1668	Originally a school, it was altered in the 19th century, and has been converted into a library. The building is in stone with quoins, moulded gutter brackets, and a stone slate roof. There are two storeys and three bays. The main doorway has composite chamfered jambs, and a segmental-arched lintel with the date in relief in a shield. In the ground floor are two large windows, and the upper floor contains three sash windows with plain surrounds.	II
Lumb Beck Farmhouse; 53.92636°N 1.88617°W	—	1670	The farmhouse, which was largely rebuilt in about 1970, is in stone with quoins and a stone slate roof. There are two storeys, three bays, and a rear outshut. The doorway on the front is arched and dated, and the doorway in the outshut has a chamfered surround. The windows are mullioned, and in the angle at the rear is a two-storey circular stair tower.	II
Low Sanfitt; 53.95357°N 1.91039°W	—	1671	A stone house with a stone slate roof and two storeys. The doorway on the front has a chamfered surround, composite jambs, and a monolithic dated lintel. At the rear is a lean-to, and a doorway with monolithic jambs. The windows are mullioned, with some mullions removed.	II
Low House; 53.94439°N 1.87849°W	—	1675	The house, which has since been altered, is in stone with quoins, and a stone slate roof with coped gables and kneelers. There are two storeys, an L-shaped plan, a symmetrical front of three bays, and a rear outshut under a catslide roof. The central doorway has a semicircular arched head, monolithic jambs, a fanlight, impost blocks, and a keystone. The flanking windows are mullioned with three lights. At the rear is a doorway with monolithic jambs, over which is a datestone, and a stair window. On the left return is a two-storey bay window.	II
Causeway Foot Farmhouse; 53.94730°N 1.90373°W	—	Late 17th century (probable)	The farmhouse, which was later extended, is in stone with a stone slate roof. There are two storeys, the original part has one bay, and the extension added another bay. The doorway has a chamfered surround, composite jambs, and a deep lintel. In the original part the windows are mullioned, in the extension they are sashes, and at the rear is a narrow window with three lights and transoms.	II
Cross Bank Farmhouse; 53.94903°N 1.90656°W	—	Late 17th century	The farmhouse, which was altered in the 19th century, is in stone with quoins, and has a stone slate roof with a coped gable and kneelers. There are two storeys, two bays, and a rear outshut. Each bay contains a doorway with monolithic jambs, and the windows are mullioned, with some mullions removed.	II
Barn, cowhouse and granary southwest of Farfield Hall; 53.96024°N 1.88530°W	—	Late 17th century (probable)	The cowhouse is the earliest part, with the granary dating from the 18th century, and the barn dated 1783. The buildings form a single range and are in stone with quoins, a stone slate roof with coped gables and kneelers, and two storeys. The cowhouse has three bays, a central doorway with composite jambs and an arched lintel, later doorways, and pitching holes. The granary contains a taking-in door with monolithic jambs, a sash window, and vents. The barn projects, it has four bays, and a segmental-arched cart entry with composite jambs and a dated keystone, and vents.	II
Fell Edge Farmhouse; 53.92680°N 1.88993°W	—	Late 17th century	A stone house with a stone slate roof, two storeys, two bays, and a rear outshut. On the front is a gabled porch and a doorway with a chamfered surround rising to form a false ogee, and a shaped lintel. The mullions have been removed from the windows.	II
Inprint Gallery; 53.94441°N 1.88737°W	—	Late 17th century	A cottage attached to the end of a row of houses, it is in stone with quoins, and a stone slate roof with a coped gable and kneelers on the left. There are two storeys, one bay, and a rear outshut. The doorways on the front have been converted into windows, and on the sides and rear are mullioned windows.	II
Over Gate Croft; 53.92820°N 1.87369°W	—	Late 17th century (probable)	The house, which was later altered and extended, is in stone with quoins and a stone slate roof. There are two storeys, two bays, and a lean-to on the left. There are three doorways with monolithic jambs, two of them with chamfered surrounds, and the windows are mullioned, with some mullions removed, and some windows altered.	II
Dale Cottage and Fir Cottage; 53.94341°N 1.87636°W	—	1677	A house and two cottages that were extended and altered in the 18th century, they are in stone with quoins, a stone slate roof with coped gables and kneelers, and two storeys. One doorway has a chamfered surround, composite jambs, and a dated lintel, another has a 20th-century porch and an 18th-century doorway, and the third doorway has monolithic jambs. Most windows are mullioned, and some have single lights.	II
Five chest tombs 53.96226°N 1.88519°W		1687	The five attached chest tombs are in the burial ground of Farfield Friends' Meeting House. They are for members of the family of Farfield Hall, and have dates between 1687 and 1737. The tombs have sandstone bases carrying grave slabs, one with a chamfered edge, and the others have moulded edges and borders.	II
Friends' Meeting House; 53.96216°N 1.88549°W		1689	The meeting house is in stone with quoins, and a stone slate roof with coped gables and kneelers. There is a single storey and three bays. The doorway has composite jambs, and a segmental-arched lintel with the date in a tressure. The windows are mullioned, with three lights to the left of the door, and four lights to the right.	II*
Cragg House; 53.92456°N 1.87523°W	—	1695	A stone house with quoins, square gutter brackets, and a stone slate roof with coped gables and kneelers. There are two storeys, a double-depth plan and two bays. The central doorway has a moulded surround and an ogee lintel, above which is a datestone and a hood mould stepped over it. The windows are mullioned.	II
High House, Addingham Moorside; 53.92957°N 1.89403°W	—	1697	The house, which was extended to the left in the 19th century, is in stone, with quoins, and a stone slate roof with coped gables and kneelers. There are two storeys and an attic. The original part has a double-depth plan and two bays. The doorway has a moulded architrave, above it is a datestone, and over that an oculus. In the extension are two doorways with monolithic jambs, the doorway at the rear is in the upper floor and approached by steps, and in the left return is a doorway with composite jambs and a chamfered surround rising to form a false ogee lintel. Most of the windows in both parts are mullioned.	II
Barn northeast of Ghyll House; 53.92664°N 1.88570°W	—	Late 17th or early 18th century (probable)	A stone barn with quoins, and a stone slate roof with coped gables and kneelers. There are three bays, and an aisle to the north. On the front is a central doorway with a chamfered surround and composite jambs, and to the left is a doorway with a chamfered surround and a quoined lintel. At the rear is a porch with a catslide roof.	II
Gildersber Cottage; 53.93681°N 1.89524°W	—	1717	A stone house with quoins, and a stone slate roof with coped gables and kneelers. There are two storeys, and two bays. The doorway has double tie-stone jambs, a chamfered surround rising to form a false ogee, an arched lintel, formerly dated, and a hood mould. The windows are mullioned, with some mullions removed.	II
16 and 18 Church Street; 53.94312°N 1.87569°W	—	Early 18th century (probable)	A pair of stone houses with quoins, and a stone slate roof with coped gables and kneelers. There are two storeys, and each house has two bays. The doorways are paired in the centre, and have chamfered surrounds and composite jambs. In the upper floor are two four-light mullioned windows, over the doors is a single-light sash window, and in the ground floor are inserted sash windows.	II
Gate piers, walls and summerhouse, Farfield Hall; 53.96072°N 1.88356°W	—	Early 18th century	There are two pairs of stone gate piers. The pair to the east are tall and have Doric pilasters, a full entablature on each side, and are surmounted by urns. The pair to the west have a square plan, and each has a cornice surmounted by an obelisk. The stone walls enclose the garden on three sides, they have chamfered copings, and are ramped to the south. In the north wall is a doorway with a semicircular-arched head, a moulded surround, and a keystone. The summer house has a roof with half-coped gables and kneelers, and it contains a doorway with a semicircular-arched head, rusticated voussoirs and quoins.	I
Gate piers and orchard walls, Farfield Hall; 53.96062°N 1.88502°W	—	Early 18th century	The walls enclosing the orchard on three sides are in stone with flat copings, and some re-lining in brick. They ramp up over a doorway with a moulded architrave and a segmental pediment. On the wall over the doorway is a pineapple finial. The gate piers, which were added in the 19th century, each has a cornice and a pineapple finial.	II
Terrace, balustrade and steps, Farfield Hall; 53.96050°N 1.88341°W	—	Early 18th century	The terrace is paved with stone flags, and is flanked by panelled stone piers and a moulded rail with vase-shaped balusters. The balustrade is coped and ends in square piers, between which are five steps, the treads treated as imposts.	II
Small cottage south of Gildersber Cottage; 53.93672°N 1.89535°W	—	Early 18th century (probable)	A small stone cottage with quoins and a stone slate roof. There are two storeys and one bay. On the front is a two-light mullioned window, with the mullion removed, in each floor. In the right return is a doorway with composite jambs and a lintel with a chamfered surround, and a single-light window.	II
Paradise Laithe; 53.96187°N 1.88222°W	—	Early 18th century (probable)	An aisled barn in stone, with quoins, and a stone slate roof with coped gables and kneelers. On the front is a tall cart entry with composite jambs and a wooden lintel, to the left is a doorway with monolithic jambs, and under the eaves are vents. At the rear is a portal in the aisle containing a doorway with composite jambs and a wooden lintel. In the left return are vents and an arrow slit in the apex.	II
School Wood Farmhouse; 53.92819°N 1.89269°W	—	Early 18th century	A stone house with quoins, and a stone slate roof with coped gables and shaped kneelers. There are two storeys, a double-depth plan, and two bays. The original doorway has a chamfered surround and composite jambs, and has been converted into a window. In the right return is a later porch that has a doorway with monolithic jambs. The windows are mullioned with some mullions removed.	II
Smithy Cottage; 53.94335°N 1.87598°W	—	Early 18th century	A stone house with quoins, moulded gutter brackets, and a stone slate roof with a coped gable and kneelers on the left. There are two storeys and a symmetrical front of two bays. The central doorway has a chamfered surround and composite jambs, and the windows are mullioned with three lights.	II
Lower Brocka Bank; 53.93348°N 1.89314°W	—	1728	A stone house with There are two storeys, a double-depth plan, and two bays. The central doorway has a chamfered surround rising to form an ogee, composite jambs, and an arched dated lintel. At the rear is a doorway with monolithic jambs and a slate hood. The windows are mullioned, some have been altered, and some mullions have been removed.	II
Farfield Hall; 53.96064°N 1.88347°W		c. 1729	A country house incorporating some earlier fabric, with additions made in the 20th century. It is in stone with hipped roofs of stone slate and lead, and has two storeys, attics and cellars, and a double-pile plan. The south front is symmetrical with seven bays, the middle three bays projecting, flanked by fluted Corinthian pilasters and with a modillioned pediment containing an elaborate coat of arms. The front has a plinth, rusticated quoins, a band, an entablature, a modillioned eaves cornice and a parapet with vermiculated rustication and urns on the corners. The central doorway has an architrave, a decorated entablature, and a broken pediment on consoles containing a shell. Above is a decorated frieze and a dentilled cornice with egg-and-dart ornament. The windows are sashes in architraves. There is a single-storey two-bay extension to the left, the east front is symmetrical with five bays, to its right is a music room, and to the west is a two-bay kitchen block.	I
114 Main Street and 1 Sugar Hill; 53.94479°N 1.88441°W		1730	A pair of houses on a plinth, with quoins, a string course, and a stone slate roof with coped gables and kneelers. There are two storeys, three bays, and a rear outshut. The original doorway has an architrave, a dated frieze, and a moulded cornice, and there is an inserted doorway with monolithic jambs. The windows are mullioned, with some mullions removed.	II
Bakehouse, 114 Main Street; 53.94486°N 1.88456°W	—	1730 (probable)	The bakehouse at the rear of the house is in stone, with quoins and a stone slate roof. There is one storey and one bay. On the south side are two-light mullioned windows, the east side contains a doorway with a dressed lintel, and projecting from the gable on the north side is a domed beehive-oven.	II
Low Laithe Barn; 53.92987°N 1.87872°W	—	1733	A field barn in stone with quoins and a stone slate roof. It contains a segmental-arched cart entry with composite jambs, and to the right is a doorway with a chamfered surround and a dated lintel. At the rear is a doorway with a chamfered surround, tie-stone jambs, and a crude hood. In the gable ends are vents and a triangular owl hole.	II
Wine Beck Farmhouse; 53.94893°N 1.87889°W	—	1733	A stone house with quoins, and a stone slate roof with coped gables and kneelers. There are two storeys, a symmetrical front of three bays, and rear wings. The doorway has fluted pilasters, a fanlight, and an open pediment, above which is a date plaque with a moulded surround. Most of the windows are mullioned.	II
Barn, Causeway Foot Farm; 53.94734°N 1.90354°W	—	Early to mid 18th century (probable)	A stone barn with quoins and a stone slate roof. It contains a segmental-arched cart entry with composite jambs, doorways, and vents. At the rear is a lean-to.	II
Walls and gateway, Friends' Meeting House; 53.96212°N 1.88527°W	—	Early to mid 18th century (probable)	The stone walls enclose the burial ground, they have semicircular copings, a roughly rectangular plan, and are about 5 feet 6 inches (1.68 m) high. The gateway has a chamfered surround and composite jambs.	II
Barn north of Gildersber Cottage; 53.93720°N 1.89519°W	—	Early to mid 18th century	A stone barn with quoins, and a stone slate roof with coped gables and kneelers. It contains a central cart entry with quoined angles, and an inner doorway in a portal. To the right is a doorway with a chamfered surround and composite jambs.	II
Gildersber Farmhouse; 53.93691°N 1.89559°W	—	Early to mid 18th century (probable)	A stone house with quoins, and a stone slate roof with coped gables and kneelers. There are two storeys, three bays, and a lean-to on the right. The windows are mullioned.	II
Reynard Ings; 53.93190°N 1.86711°W	—	Early to mid 18th century	A laithe house, it is rendered and partly pebbledashed, and has a stone slate roof. The house has quoins and two storeys. There is a later gabled porch, and it contains horizontally-sliding sash windows. The barn has a segmental-arched cart entry with voussoirs, a quoined surround and an inner porch. It contains doorways, windows, a pitching hole and a gabled dovecote.	II
Sunny Bank Farmhouse; 53.92596°N 1.88382°W	—	Early to mid 18th century (probable)	A stone house with quoins, and a stone slate roof with coped gables and kneelers. There are two storeys, a double-depth plan, and two bays. The doorway has a chamfered surround, the windows are mullioned, and at the rear is a stair window.	II
Small Banks Farmhouse; 53.93385°N 1.88356°W	—	1740	A stone house with quoins and a stone slate roof. There are two storeys, three bays, and a cellar. The main doorway has monolithic jambs, an architrave, and a cornice on consoles, and there is a doorway with a chamfered surround and composite jambs. The windows are mullioned with four lights and some mullions removed.	II
Mounting block, Small Banks Farmhouse; 53.93376°N 1.88361°W	—	1740 (probable)	The mounting block is attached to a garden wall in front of the farmhouse. It consists of five large stones forming steps, and a square mounting stone on the top.	II
5 The Green; 53.94653°N 1.89315°W	—	1746	A stone house with quoins, paired gutter brackets, and a stone slate roof with coped gables and kneelers. There are two storeys, a double-depth plan, and three bays. The doorway has monolithic jambs, and above it is a datestone. The windows on the front have been altered, and at the rear are mullioned windows, with some mullions removed, and a stair window with a chamfered surround.	II
88, 90 and 92/94 Main Street and cottage at rear 53.94459°N 1.88580°W	—	c. 1748	A row of cottages and another cottage at the rear, they are in stone with a stone slate roof and two storeys. Two of the doorways on the front have composite jambs, chamfered surrounds rising to false ogees, and deep lintels; the left lintel is dated. The other doorways and the windows are altered. The cottage at the rear has a single bay, a monolithic lintel, and a taking-in door.	II
2, 4 and 6 Low Mill Lane; 53.94076°N 1.86318°W	—	Mid 18th century	A stone house and cottage, the latter dating from the early 19th century. The house has quoins, two storeys, and a symmetrical front of three bays. The central doorway has monolithic jambs and a lintel, and the windows are mullioned with two lights. The cottage to the right has two storeys and two bays, a central doorway with a semicircular fanlight, and sash windows.	II
Farfield Cottages; 53.96242°N 1.88492°W		Mid 18th century	A house and a cottage added later, they are in stone, with quoins, a stone slate roof with coped gables and kneelers, and two storeys. The house has a symmetrical front of three bays, a doorway with pilaster strips and a triangular pediment, and two-light mullioned sash windows. The lower cottage to the left has a doorway with monolithic jambs and stepped mullioned windows.	II
Steps, walls and urns, Farfield Hall; 53.96029°N 1.88436°W	—	Mid 18th century	The flight of eight stone steps has each riser treated as an impost. The steps are flanked by square piers linked by dwarf walls with ramped coping. The top piers are surmounted by urns carved as flaming torches.	II
Hawthorn House; 53.94503°N 1.89108°W	—	18th century	A house that was altered and extended in the 19th century, and has been divided into two. It is in stone on a plinth, with quoins, a band, and a stone slate roof with coped gables and kneelers. There are two storeys and four bays. The main doorway has pilasters, a fanlight, and a triangular open pediment, and the doorway to the right has monolithic jambs. The windows on the front are sashes, at the rear is a stair window with a semicircular-arched head, an impost block and a keystone, and there are inserted modern windows.	II
Holme House; 53.94189°N 1.86796°W	—	18th century	A pair of cottages that were later altered and extended to form a U-shaped plan. The house is in stone with a stone slate roof and two storeys. The original part has paired doorways, one blocked, with tie-stone jambs and deep lintels, and mullioned windows. The outer wings have plinths, quoins, and later two-storey bay windows.	II
Milestone, Four Lanes End; 53.93101°N 1.90508°W		Mid 18th century (probable)	The milestone is at a road junction, and consists of a stone with a square plan. It is inscribed with pointing hands and the distances to Colne and Otley.	II
Bee boles, Reynard Ings; 53.93183°N 1.86720°W	—	Mid 18th century	The bee boles are in stone and are attached to the rear of the house. They consist of four rectangular recesses with monolithic lintels and sills, and composite jambs.	II
Small Banks Farm Cottage; 53.93386°N 1.88338°W	—	18th century	A stone cottage that has a stone slate roof with a coped gable to the right. The doorway has a chamfered surround, and the windows are mullioned.	II
Small Banks Joiner's Shop; 53.93373°N 1.88344°W	—	Mid 18th century	A stone outbuilding with quoins, and a stone slate roof with coped gables and kneelers. There are two storeys and three bays. In each bay is a doorway with tie-stone jambs and a moulded lintel, and above is a narrow window with small-paned glazing.	II
The Fleece Public House and Barn; 53.94393°N 1.88128°W		Mid 18th century	The public house and barn to the right are in stone, with quoins, the house part has a stone slate roof, and the barn has a tile roof. The house has two storeys and a symmetrical front of three bays. The central doorway is arched, and has chamfered surrounds and composite jambs. Above it is a sash window, and in the other bays are two-light mullioned windows. The barn has a lower roofline, and contains a segmental-arched cart entry and an arched doorway, both with chamfered surrounds and composite jambs.	II
High House, Addingham; 53.94403°N 1.88018°W	—	1752	The house, which was later altered and extended, is in stone with a slate roof. There are two storeys and three bays, the middle bay recessed. The outer bays have rusticated quoins and cornices creating open pedimented gables with coping and ball finials. On the front are tripartite sash windows, those in the upper floor with architraves and keystones. At the rear are three-light mullioned windows, and a doorway with a datestone above.	II
2 and 3 Brumfitt Hill; 53.94485°N 1.88501°W	—	1755	A pair of mirror-image stone houses, with quoins and a stone slate roof. There are two storeys and two bays. The paired doorways in the centre have composite jambs, and arched lintels, the left inscribed with initials and the right with the date. The windows are mullioned with some mullions removed, and at the rear is a staircase window.	II
Cuckoo's Nest Farmhouse and barn 53.93093°N 1.88997°W	—	1758	A laithe house that was extended in the 19th century, it is in stone with quoins and a stone slate roof. The cottage has two storeys and an attic, a double-depth plan, a single bay, and an added lower bay. The doorway has a chamfered surround, tie-stone jambs, and a dated false ogee lintel, and the windows have single lights. The barn to the left has a segmental-arched cart entry with a portal and a square-headed entrance. The doorway has a chamfered surround, tie-stone jambs and a deep lintel.	II
8 Main Street; 53.94554°N 1.89188°W	—	1766	A stone house with quoins, and a stone slate roof with coped gables and kneelers. There are two storeys and three bays. The central doorway has composite jambs and a deep lintel, and at the rear is a doorway with a chamfered surround. The windows are mullioned with some mullions removed. Above the doorway is an arched recess with a false impost and a keystone containing a datestone, and in the left return is a blocked taking-in door.	II
Barn southeast of Moor View; 53.93367°N 1.88411°W	—	1766	A stone barn with quoins, and a stone slate roof with coped gables and kneelers. It contains a segmental-arched cart entry with composite jambs, and inside is a square-headed entry in a portal with a chamfered surround and the date. Above it is s circular owl hole, and elsewhere are a doorway and vents.	II
The Crown Hotel; 53.94417°N 1.88271°W		1769	The public house, which was extended to the left in the 19th century, is in stone with quoins and a slate roof, hipped to the right. The doorway has a chamfered surround and double tie-stone jambs, and above it is a date plaque in a semicircular-arched recess with an impost and keystone. In the right bay are sash windows, the middle bay contains two-light mullioned windows, and in the extension are two-light windows.	II
1 Brumfitt Hill; 53.94489°N 1.88487°W	—	Late 18th century	A stone house with quoins and a stone slate roof. There are two storeys, one bay, and a small two-storey rear wing. The doorway has a chamfered surround and composite jambs. On the front is a three-light mullioned window in each floor. The right return contains a blocked taking-indoor and a sash window.	II
101 Main Street; 53.94445°N 1.88537°W	—	Late 18th century	A stone house with quoins on the right, and a stone slate roof. There are two storeys and two bays The central doorway has monolithic jambs and imposts, and the windows contain altered glazing.	II
Burnside Mill House; 53.94416°N 1.88602°W	—	Late 18th century	The house, which was extended in 1800, is in stone with quoins, moulded gutter brackets, and a stone slate roof with coped gables and kneelers. There are two storeys, the original house had one bay, and the extension added one bay. The original part has a doorway with monolithic jambs and impost blocks, and the windows are sashes. The doorway in the extension has monolithic jambs, and there is a small window with a plain surround.	II
Well house, Farfield House; 53.96012°N 1.88566°W	—	Late 18th century	The building is in stone with quoins and a hipped stone slate roof. There is one storey and five bays. It contains doorways with tie-stone jambs, and vents, some of which are blocked.	II
High Mill; 53.94795°N 1.87612°W		Late 18th century	The former textile mill, which incorporates an earlier corn mill, has been converted for residential use. It is in stone with quoins and a stone slate roof. There are three storeys, basements and attics, 15 bays on the front overlooking the river, and ten bays at the rear. In both ends are segmental-arched openings.	II
Dovecote, Street House; 53.94304°N 1.89840°W	—	Late 18th century	The dovecote to the north of the barn is in stone, with quoins and a stone slate roof. There is one storey, and it contains a window with a plain surround in the south front, and in the right gable end is a rectangular window with an arched lintel.	II
Surgery; 53.94443°N 1.88522°W	—	Late 18th century	A stone house with a gable end to the street, it has quoins, and a slate roof with coped gables and kneelers. There are two storeys and a front of four bays. In the left bay is a doorway with an architrave, and the windows have architraves and moulded sills. In the front facing the street is a doorway with monolithic jambs, to the right is a shop window and a doorway converted into a window, and a window above.	II
Throstle Nest; 53.93648°N 1.87944°W	—	Late 18th century	A stone house with quoins, and a stone slate roof with coped gables and kneelers. There are two storeys and an attic, a double-depth plan, and three bays. The original doorway has monolithic jambs and impost blocks, and there is a later doorway with a Tudor arch and a chamfered surround. The windows are mullioned, some are stepped, and at the rear is a single-light stair window. Also at the rear, in the upper floor, is a doorway with a chamfered surround and large tie-stones.	II
99 Main Street and barn 53.94446°N 1.88556°W		1777	A barn with an added workshop, later converted for residential use, the building is in stone, with quoins, a stone slate roof, and two storeys. There is a segmental-arched cart entry with a quoined surround, a keystone, and a portal, above it is an owl hole, and it is flanked by arched vents. To the left, external steps lead up to a doorway with impost blocks, and below it is another doorway. To the left is a former doorway converted into a window; it has a segmental arched head with alternate raised and flush voussoirs, and above it is a sash window.	II
Barn north of Street House; 53.94289°N 1.89846°W	—	1779	A stone barn with quoins, a stone slate roof with coped gables and kneelers, and three bays. The barn contains a wide segmental-arched entrance with a lintel of two stones, and composite jambs, a doorway with a quoined lintel, and three windows. In the left return is a taking-in door with tie-stone jambs and a datestone in the gable.	II
Stables, piggery, hen-house and cartshed, Farfield Hall; 53.96008°N 1.88524°W	—	1783 (probable)	The farm buildings are in stone with a stone slate roof. They have a single storey, and form an L-shaped plan. The stables have two sets of paired doorways, each with a central monolithic jamb and a common lintel, and two square windows. The cartshed has three entries with monolithic jambs, and at the west is a three-bay building that has a doorway with tie-stone jambs, quoins, and a coped gable containing a circular window with four keystones. The piggery has a small yard in the front, and the hen house has nesting boxes built into the wall.	II
Moor View; 53.93387°N 1.88381°W	—	1785	A stone house with quoins, and a stone slate roof with coped gables and kneelers. There are two storeys and a cellar, a double-depth plan, and two bays. The central doorway has monolithic jambs, and above it is a decorative date plaque. The windows are mullioned, and at the rear is a stair window.	II
Peak Ridding; 53.94800°N 1.89623°W	—	1786	A house, and a later cottage, now combined, the building is in stone with quoins and a stone slate roof. There are two storeys and four bays. The doorway has monolithic jambs, and a triangular chamfered hood with the date in the tympanum. The windows are mullioned, and one has been converted into a French window.	II
High Bank; 53.94477°N 1.88822°W	—	1790	A stone house on a plinth, with rusticated quoins, a band, and moulded coped gables and kneelers. There are two storeys and an attic, and a symmetrical front of three bays. The central doorway has jambs treated as rusticated quoins, a lintel with false voussoirs, and a triangular pediment. Above it is a niche containing a date plaque. The outer bays contain two-storey canted bay windows.	II
Road bridge over the Town Beck; 53.94453°N 1.88488°W	—	c 1790	The bridge carries Main Street over the Town Beck. It is in stone and consists of a single segmental arch. The bridge has a channelled parapet and circular piers with domed caps.	II
10, 14, 16, and 20 Low Mill Lane; 53.94030°N 1.86269°W		Late 18th to early 19th century	A row of four stone cottages with a stone slate roof. There are two storeys and seven bays. The doorways have monolithic lintels, and the windows, which are sashes, have monolithic lintels and sills.	II
23, 25, 27 and 29 Low Mill Lane; 53.94001°N 1.86289°W	—	Late 18th to early 19th century	A row of four stone cottages with a stone slate roof, three storeys, and one bay each. The doorways are paired and have monolithic lintels, and the windows, which are sashes, also have monolithic lintels.	II
Gate piers at south entrance, Farfield Hall; 53.96002°N 1.88214°W	—	Late 18th or early 19th century	The gate piers are in stone, and are panelled with pilasters. Each gate pier has a cornice with consoles, and a large pineapple finial. Between them are simple wrought iron gates.	II
Farfield House; 53.95484°N 1.88297°W	—	Late 18th or early 19th century	A stone house on a plinth, with quoins, a floor band, moulded gutter brackets, and a stone slate roof with coped gables and kneelers. There are two storeys and three bays. The windows are sashes, and the doorway is a later insertion.	II
Highfield House; 53.95477°N 1.90058°W	—	Late 18th or early 19th century	A stone house, partly rendered, on a plinth, with rusticated quoins, a moulded eaves cornice, and a slate roof, hipped to the front, with coped gables and kneelers. There are two storeys, a basement and attic, a double-depth plan, and three bays. The doorway has monolithic jambs, most of the windows are sashes, there is an arched stair window at the rear, and an oculus in the attic.	II
Mill, Chapel Street; 53.94498°N 1.88620°W		Late 18th or early 19th century	The former mill is in stone with quoins, and a tile roof with coped gables and kneelers. There are five storeys, and twelve bays. The windows have plain surrounds, and some are blocked. There are taking-in doors on the front and in the right return.	II
10, 12, 14 and 16 The Rookery, Bolton Road; 53.94461°N 1.88192°W	—	c. 1805	Originally eight back-to-back houses, later four through-houses, they are in stone with quoins, and a stone slate roof with coped gables and kneelers. There are two storeys, and each house has one bay. The doorways are paired and have tie-stone jambs. Most of the windows have been altered, including the insertion of bow windows at the rear.	II
36, 38, 40 and 42 The Rookery, Bolton Road and loomshop 53.94472°N 1.88179°W		c. 1805	Originally eight back-to-back houses, later four through-houses, they are in stone with quoins, and a stone slate roof with coped gables and kneelers. There are two storeys, and each house has one bay. The doorways are paired and have tie-stone jambs, and most of the windows are sashes. Attached at right angles is a loomshop with six doorways and six sash windows.	II
Barn north of the Old Rectory; 53.94305°N 1.87032°W	—	1806	A stone barn with gutter brackets, a stone slate roof, and a symmetrical front of five bays. In the centre is a segmental-arched cart entry with composite jambs and a keystone, and above it is a lunette and a date plaque. Flanking the entry are doorways with composite jambs and dressed lintels, and there are rectangular vents with arched heads. In the left return is a stone carved with a cross, and a re-used medieval grave slab.	II
The Old Rectory; 53.94289°N 1.87009°W		1808	The former rectory is in stone on a plinth, with rusticated quoins, an eaves cornice on consoles, and a stone slate roof with moulded coping. There are two storeys and an attic, a double depth plan, and a front of three bays under a triangular pediment. The central doorway has a semicircular-arched head, an architrave, a fanlight, impost blocks, and a keystone. The windows are sashes, those in the upper floor with moulded imposts. At the rear is a semicircular-arched stair window with a moulded impost and a carved keystone.	II
2, 4 and 6 Burnside; 53.94429°N 1.88616°W	—	1811	A row of three stone cottages with a stone slate roof. There are two storeys, and each cottage has one bay. The doorways have monolithic jambs, and the windows have plain surrounds. Above the middle doorway is a dated plaque in a recess.	II
28, 30, 32, 34, 36 and 38 Main Street; 53.94470°N 1.88944°W		1817	A row of former weavers' houses in stone, partly rendered, with a stone slate roof. There are three storeys and eight bays. The five doorways have semicircular-arched heads, impost blocks and keystones, and two have fanlights. The windows have raised surrounds, and most of the glazing has been altered.	II
40, 42 and 44 Main Street; 53.94470°N 1.88900°W		Early 19th century	A row of three houses with quoins, stone gutter brackets, and a stone slate roof with coped gables and kneelers. There are two storeys and six bays. No. 40 has a doorway with engaged Tuscan columns, a semicircular fanlight, an entablature decorated with urns, and an open pediment, and to the left is a canted bay window. Most of the other windows are sashes, and the other doorways have monolithic jambs.	II
149 Main Street; 53.94372°N 1.88142°W		Early 19th century	A stone house with quoins, and a hipped stone slate roof. There are three storeys, a wedge-shaped plan, and one bay at the front. The doorway has a semicircular fanlight, impost blocks, and a keystone, and the windows are sashes with plain surrounds, the ground floor window with a segmental lintel.	II
Brigfield House and Walker-Acre Cottage; 53.94463°N 1.88484°W	—	Early 19th century	A house extended later in the 19th century and divided into two residences. It is in rendered stone on a plinth, with quoins, and a stone slate roof. There are three storeys, a double-depth plan, a symmetrical front of three bays, and a single-bay extension on the left. In the centre is a round-arched doorway with a keystone. The windows have plain surrounds and altered glazing, at the rear is a stair window, and in the right return is a small wheel window.	II
Barn east of Cragg House; 53.92443°N 1.87423°W	—	Early 19th century	A stone barn with quoins, and a stone slate roof with a coped gable on the left with kneelers. The barn contains a segmental-arched cart entry with a porch, to the left is a square window with a pitching hole above, and to the right is a doorway with monolithic jambs.	II
Coach house, Farfield Hall; 53.96056°N 1.88405°W	—	Early 19th century	The coach house is in stone on a plinth, with quoins, moulded gutter brackets, and a hipped stone slate roof. There are two storeys and 13 irregular bays. The coach house contains two segmental-headed carriage entrances, and semicircular-headed doorways and windows, all with impost blocks and keystones; the doorways and windows also have fanlights. In the upper floor are oculi with keystones, and in the right return is a Venetian window.	II
Garden sculpture, Farfield Hall; 53.96070°N 1.88362°W	—	Early 19th century (probable)	The sculpture is near the entrance to the rear garden, and is in stone. It depicts a cherub on a moulded square plinth, holding in its left hand a cornucopia surmounted by a circular bowl with a scrolled border, and the right hand holds the collar of a greyhound.	II
Guide post 53.94299°N 1.87781°W		Early 19th century (probable)	A boundary stone set in a wall opposite the junction with Church Street. It consists of a stone with a triangular plan, inscribed on one face with "BOLTON ABBEY" and on the other face with "ILKLEY".	II
Wool-comber's shop south of Hardwick House Farmhouse; 53.92212°N 1.86867°W	—	Early 19th century	The building is in stone with quoins, and it incorporates a boulder in the west wall. It has a stone slate roof and one storey. In the north gable end is a doorway with monolithic jambs, and the windows have single lights.	II
Ivy House Farmhouse; 53.94446°N 1.88897°W	—	Early 19th century	A pair of stone houses with quoins and a stone slate roof. There are two storeys, and each house has two bays. The doorways have monolithic jambs, and the windows contain altered glazing.	II
Syke House; 53.95623°N 1.88608°W	—	Early 19th century	A stone house with gutter brackets, and a stone slate roof with coped gables and kneelers. There are two storeys and a symmetrical front of three bays. The doorways have monolithic jambs, and the doorway on the front has a fanlight. The windows are sashes and at the rear is a tall stair window with tie-stone jambs.	II
The Old Malt Kiln; 53.94423°N 1.88184°W	—	Early 19th century	The malt house, later used for other purposes, is in stone with quoins and a stone slate roof. There are two storeys and a basement, and two ranges forming an L-shaped plan, with five bays on the front. Steps lead up to a doorway with monolithic jambs, there is a doorway down to the basement, and the windows are sashes.	II
The Swan Hotel; 53.94464°N 1.88517°W		Early 19th century	The public house, which was later extended, is in stone with square gutter brackets, and a stone slate roof with coped gables. There are two storeys, the original part has a symmetrical front of three bays, and the extension has two further bays to the right. The original doorway has pilasters, an entablature and a triangular pediment, and the doorway in the extension has monolithic jambs. The windows have plain surrounds, and small-pane glazing with upper casements.	II
95 and 97 Main Street; 53.94442°N 1.88577°W		c. 1826	Originally a piece hall, it is in stone with quoins, moulded gutter brackets, two storeys, a symmetrical front of three bays, and six bays in the right return. On the front are giant flanking pilasters, an entablature, a frieze with urns and quatrefoils, and a moulded pediment. In the tympanum is an oval panel containing an urn in low relief. The central doorway has monolithic jambs, a fanlight, and a cornice, and the windows are sashes. In the right return are two doorways with round-arched heads, impost blocks, and keystones.	II
143 and 145 Main Street; 53.94380°N 1.88200°W	—	1826	A pair of mirror-image stone houses on a plinth, with quoins, gutter brackets, and a stone slate roof with coped gables. There are three storeys and two bays. The doorways have semicircular fanlights, impost blocks and keystones, and the windows are sashes with plain surrounds, the ground floor windows with segmental lintels.	II
Low White Well; 53.95262°N 1.91909°W	—	1826	A stone house that has a slate roof with coped gables. There are two storeys, a double-depth plan, and two bays. The doorway has monolithic jambs, and above it is a decorative dated plaque. The windows are sashes, and at the rear is a central stair window.	II
148 Main Street and railings 53.94394°N 1.88165°W	—	c. 1830	A stone house in a terrace, with quoins, an eaves band, and a stone slate roof. There are two storeys and two bays. The main doorway and the passage door to the left have plain surrounds, and the windows are sashes. Enclosing the front garden is a wall with ornate iron railings and a gate, and at the corners are square stone panelled piers with flat tops.	II
153, 155 and 157 Main Street; 53.94356°N 1.87940°W		Early to mid 19th century	A row of three stone houses, partly rendered, with a band, paired gutter brackets, a hipped slate roof, and two storeys. Each house has a doorway with pilasters, an entablature, and a cornice. The windows are sashes, and in the left bay is a stair window.	II
Ashgate House; 53.94209°N 1.87260°W	—	Early to mid 19th century	A stone house with quoins at the west end, and a hipped stone slate roof with terracotta ridge tiles. There are two storeys and an irregular plan consisting of two parallel ranges and another at right angles. The main doorway has a fanlight and an open pediment, and there is another doorway with tie-stone jambs. The windows are sashes, and there is a tall stair window.	II
Milestone southeast of Low Holme House; 53.93893°N 1.86740°W		Early to mid 19th century	The milestone is on the northeast side of Ilkley Road. It is in stone with a triangular plan and an arched top, and is overlaid with cast iron. The top is inscribed "SKIPTON & OTLEY ROAD" and "ADDINGHAM ", and on the lower faces are the distances to Ilkley, Otley, Bolton Bridge, and Skipton.	II
Milestone, Silsden Road; 53.94010°N 1.91087°W		Early to mid 19th century	The milestone is on the south side of Silsden Road (A6034 road). It is in stone with a triangular plan and an arched top, and is overlaid with cast iron. The top is inscribed "BLACKBURN ADDINGHAM & COCKING END ROAD" and "ADDINGHAM ", and on the lower faces are the distances to Ilkley, Addingham, Keighley and Burnley.	II
Hallcroft Hall; 53.94166°N 1.87162°W	—	c. 1840	A stone house on a plinth, with a band, oversailing eaves with paired Ionic modillions, and a hipped slate roof. There are two storeys and an attic, a double-depth plan, and a symmetrical front of five bays. On the front is a Roman Doric porch and a doorway with an architrave and a keystone on consoles. The windows are sashes with architraves, those in the ground floor with keystones. At the rear is a gabled dormer, and in the right return is a bay window with Doric columns and a moulded cornice.	II
Mausoleum and railings 53.94550°N 1.88570°W		1845	The mausoleum to George Oates Greenwood is in the churchyard of the Methodist church. It is in rusticated stone on a plinth, with a modillioned cornice, and a triangular pediment on each side with a wreath and ribbons in the tympanum. The mausoleum has a square plan, and there are two doorways each with an architrave and a fanlight. On the top is a large urn and corner blocks with wreaths. The north front contains an inscribed tablet flanked by inverted torches. The mausoleum is surrounded by fencing that has stone uprights with carved circles, and wooden cross-members between.	II
Milestone near Highfield House; 53.95467°N 1.90531°W		Mid 19th century	The milestone is on the northeast side of Skipton Road (A65 road). It is in stone with a triangular plan and an arched top, and is overlaid with cast iron. The top is inscribed "SKIPTON & OTLEY ROAD" and "ADDINGHAM ", and on the lower faces are the distances to Ilkley, Otley and Skipton.	II
Mount Hermon Wesleyan Reform Church; 53.94412°N 1.88234°W		1861	The chapel is in stone with quoins and a stone slate roof. There are two storeys, and the entrance front has three bays, with a moulded pedimented gable containing a date plaque in the tympanum. The central doorway has Doric pilasters, an entablature and a cornice, and a semicircular-arched head with a fanlight, an impost, and a keystone. Flanking the doorway are semicircular-arched windows with rusticated voussoirs and keystones, and the windows in the upper floor have arched heads and a linking impost band. On the sides and at the rear, the ground floor windows have segmental arches, and those in the upper floor have segmental heads.	II
Telephone kiosk east of the library 53.94460°N 1.88463°W		1935	The telephone kiosk to the east of the library is of the K6 type, designed by Giles Gilbert Scott. Constructed in cast iron with a square plan and a dome, it has unperforated crowns in the top panels.	II
Telephone kiosk, Parkinson Fold; 53.94325°N 1.87615°W		1935	The telephone kiosk is on the north side of Church Street, and is of the K6 type, designed by Giles Gilbert Scott. Constructed in cast iron with a square plan and a dome, it has unperforated crowns in the top panels.	II
Telephone kiosk, Smallbanks; 53.93389°N 1.88297°W		1935	The telephone kiosk is on the north side of Coocking Lane, and is of the K6 type, designed by Giles Gilbert Scott. Constructed in cast iron with a square plan and a dome, it has unperforated crowns in the top panels.	II
