= The Bingley Arms =

Pub in Leeds, England

Coordinates: 53.8816°N 1.4483°W

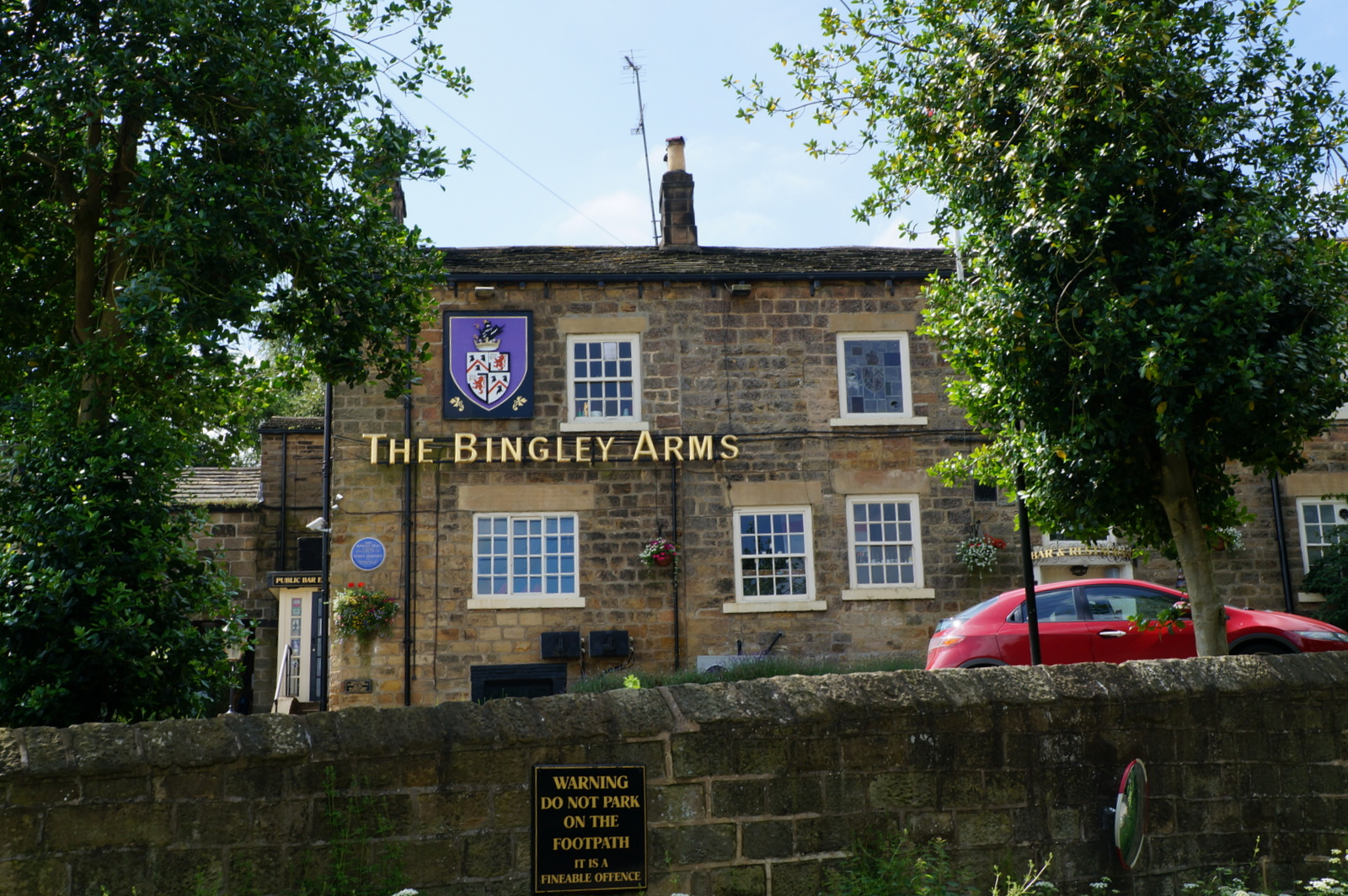
The Bingley Arms in Bardsey

The Bingley Arms is a public house in Bardsey, Leeds, West Yorkshire, England, and claims to be both the oldest surviving business and oldest surviving pub in the United Kingdom. The current building dates from the 18th century.

== Founding and history ==
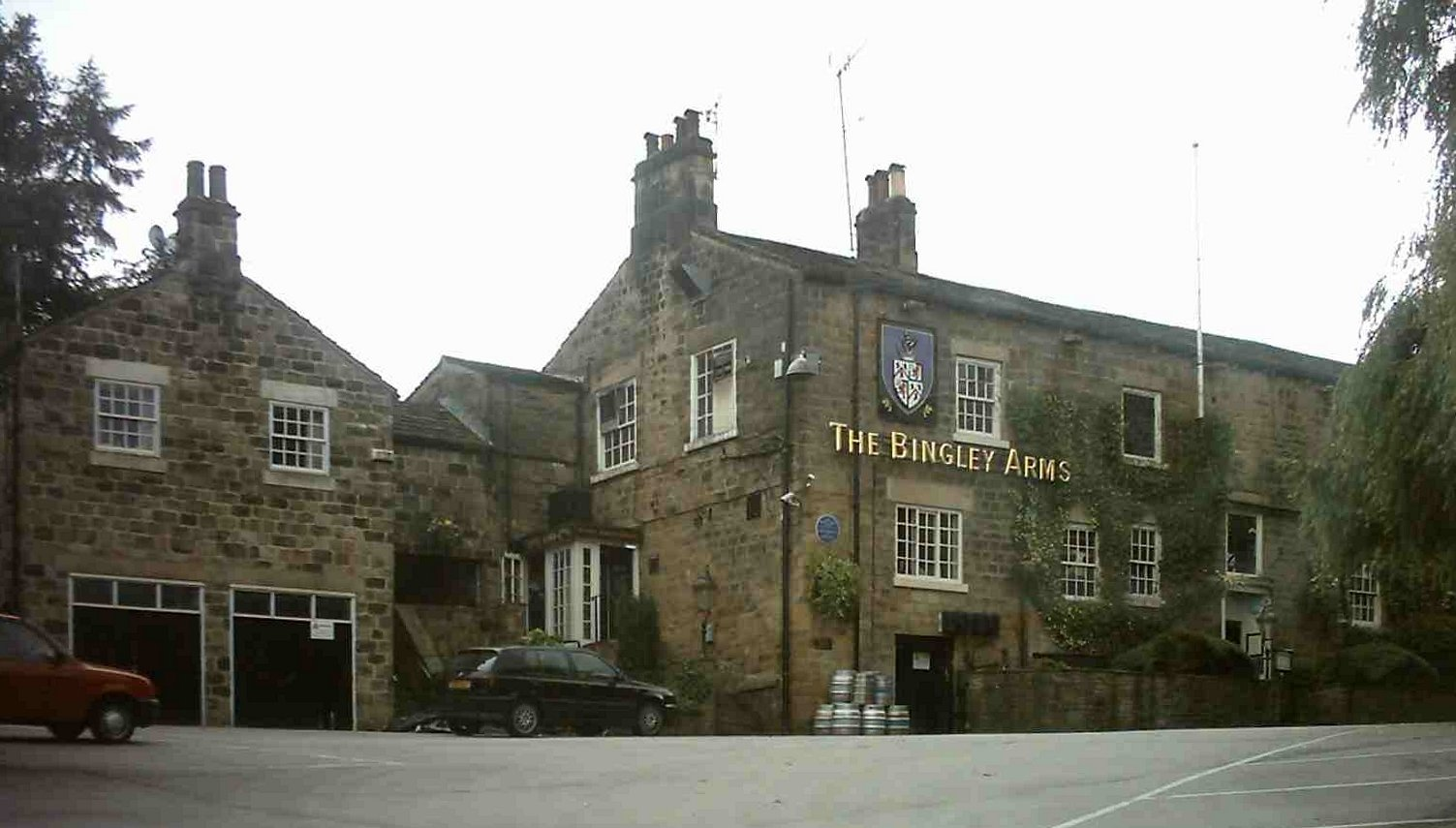
Side view

The Bingley Arms was originally named The Priests Inn. The Bingley Arms calls itself the oldest pub in Britain, with a history dating back to between 905 and 953, and says that it served as a safe house for persecuted Catholic priests, and also as a courthouse from around 1000 from which offenders were taken to the pillory across the road. There is however no actual historic study supporting these claims. The stone building structure is 18th century. The Bingley Arms was featured in a 2005 book review discussion on the invention of traditional public house history, "Great Pub Myths", and "claims to be... the oldest pub in Britain", published in the Yorkshire Evening Post.

The Bingley Arms is also a restaurant, and a former winner of the Yorkshire Evening Post Restaurant of the Year Award. The Automobile Association states it provides "charm" and "excellent food".

The beer garden is home to a yew tree that pre-dates the Bingley Arms.

== See also ==
- Listed buildings in Bardsey cum Rigton
- List of oldest companies
