= John Whittington (cricketer) =

English cricketer

Personal information
- Full name: John Whittington
- Born: c. 1837; Bardsey, Yorkshire, England
- Died: Unknown
- Batting: Unknown
- Bowling: Unknown

Career statistics
Competition	First-class
Matches	4
Runs scored	40
Batting average	5.71
100s/50s	–/–
Top score	19
Balls bowled	4
Wickets	2
Bowling average	16.50
5 wickets in innings	–
10 wickets in match	–
Best bowling	1/8
Catches/stumpings	4/–
- Source: Cricinfo, 19 November 2019

John Whittington (c. 1837 – date of death unknown) was an English first-class cricketer.

Born in Yorkshire at Bardsey in about 1837, Bleakley made his debut in first-class cricket for the Gentlemen of the North against the Gentlemen of the South at The Oval in July 1858, later playing in the return fixture played at Salford in August. In September of the same year, he played for Manchester in a first-class fixture against Sussex at Eccles. He made a fourth and final appearance in first-class cricket for the Gentlemen of the North against the Gentlemen of the South at Salford in 1860. In his four first-class matches, Whittington scored 40 runs with a high score of 19, while with the ball he took 2 wickets.
