= Bardsey cum Rigton =

Civil parish in West Yorkshire, England

Coordinates: 53.882°N 1.440°W

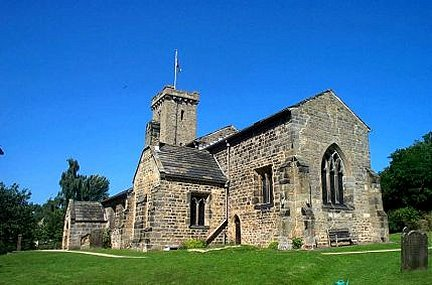
All Hallows Church, Bardsey

Bardsey cum Rigton is a civil parish in the City of Leeds metropolitan borough in West Yorkshire, England. According to the 2001 census it had a population of 2,385, increasing to 2,525 at the 2011 Census. The parish includes the villages of Bardsey, East Rigton and Thornhurst.

== Etymology ==
The name of Bardsey is first attested in the Domesday Book of 1086 as Berdesei and Bereleseie, situated in the hundred of Skyrack. The second element comes from the Old English word ēg ('island') and the first is agreed to be from a personal name. Exactly what this name was is not certain, but the name Beornrǣd is a plausible candidate. Thus the name probably once meant 'Beornrǣd's island' (or the island of someone of a similar name). Since the site is not in fact an island, it has been suggested that the name was metaphorical, referring to a hill rising, island-like, from flat ground.

The name of East Rigton is likewise first attested in the Domesday Book, as Riston, Ritone, and Ritun. The name comes from the Old Norse word hryggr ('ridge'), which had come into more general use in Old English, and the straightforwardly Old English word tūn ('farmstead, estate'). The additional element east is first attested in 1530, in the form Est Ryghton.

== See also ==
- Listed buildings in Bardsey cum Rigton
