= Bardsey, West Yorkshire =

Village near Leeds, West Yorkshire, England

Coordinates: 53.884°N 1.445°W

Bardsey
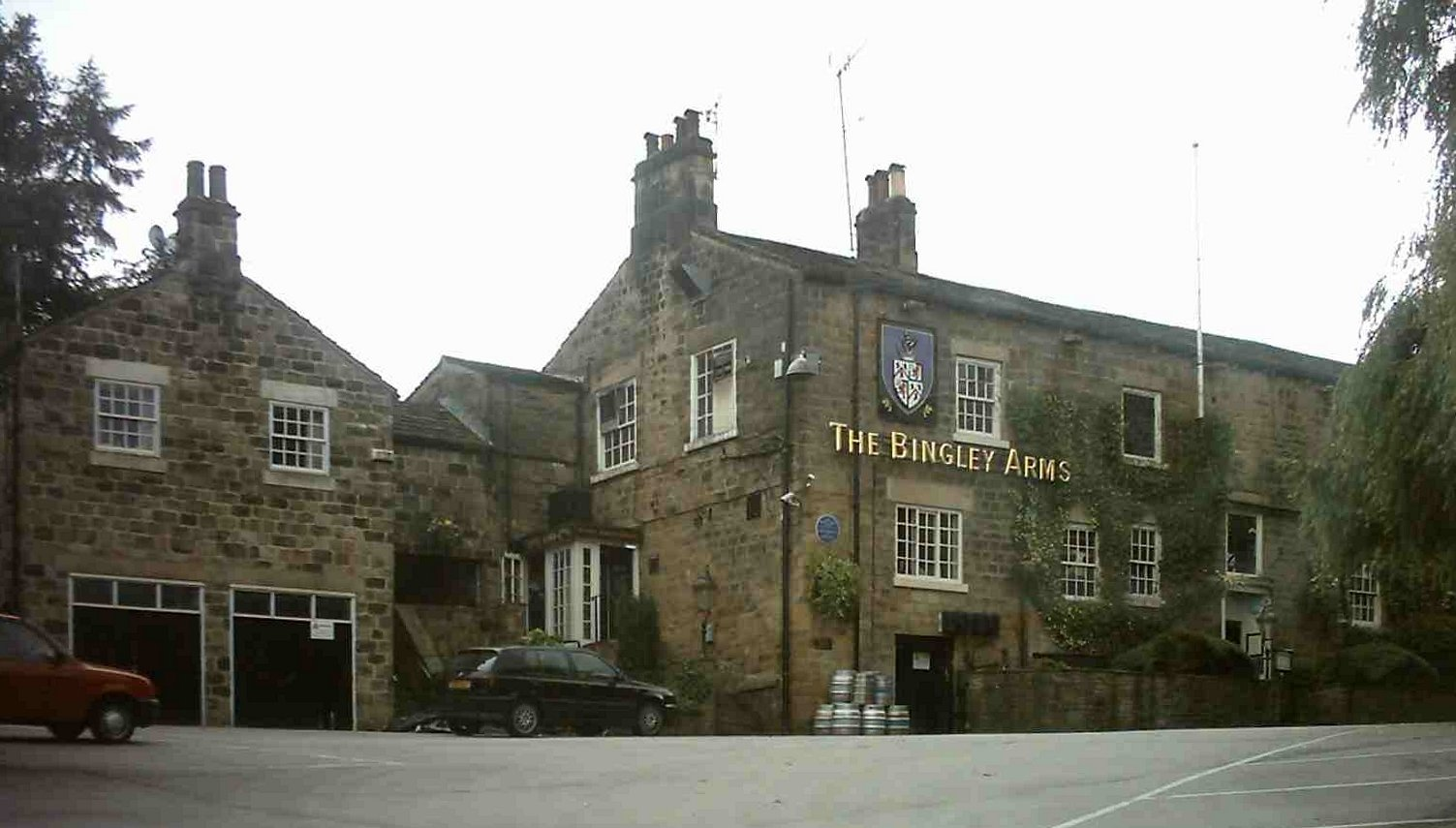
- Main Street: The Bingley Arms in Bardsey, perhaps Britain's oldest pub.

- Location within West Yorkshire
- OS grid reference: SE367432
  - London: 170 mi (270 km) SSE
- Civil parish: Bardsey cum Rigton
- Metropolitan borough: City of Leeds
- Metropolitan county: West Yorkshire
- Region: Yorkshire and the Humber
- Country: England
- Sovereign state: United Kingdom
- Post town: LEEDS
- Postcode district: LS17
- Dialling code: 01937
- Police: West Yorkshire
- Fire: West Yorkshire
- Ambulance: Yorkshire
- UK Parliament: Wetherby and Easingwold

Bardsey, West Yorkshire, England is a small village in the City of Leeds metropolitan borough, 8 miles (13 km) north east of Leeds city centre. The village is in the LS17 Leeds postcode district. It is part of the civil parish of Bardsey cum Rigton. The village itself lies just off the A58 road between Leeds and Wetherby.

It is a predominantly middle class area with a high proportion of retired residents. Housing is mixed; while most is private, there is council housing situated near Keswick Lane. Facilities include a pub and sports club (with a cricket pitch and two football pitches). Bardsey also has a primary school and an Anglican church.

== Etymology ==
The name of Bardsey is first attested in the Domesday Book of 1086 as Berdesei and Bereleseie, situated in the hundred of Skyrack. The second element comes from the Old English word ēg ('island') and the first is agreed to be from a personal name. Exactly what this name was is not certain, but the name Beornrǣd is a plausible candidate. Thus the name probably once meant 'Beornrǣd's island' (or the island of someone of a similar name). Since the site is not in fact an island, it has been suggested that the name was metaphorical, referring to a hill rising, island-like, from flat ground.

== History ==
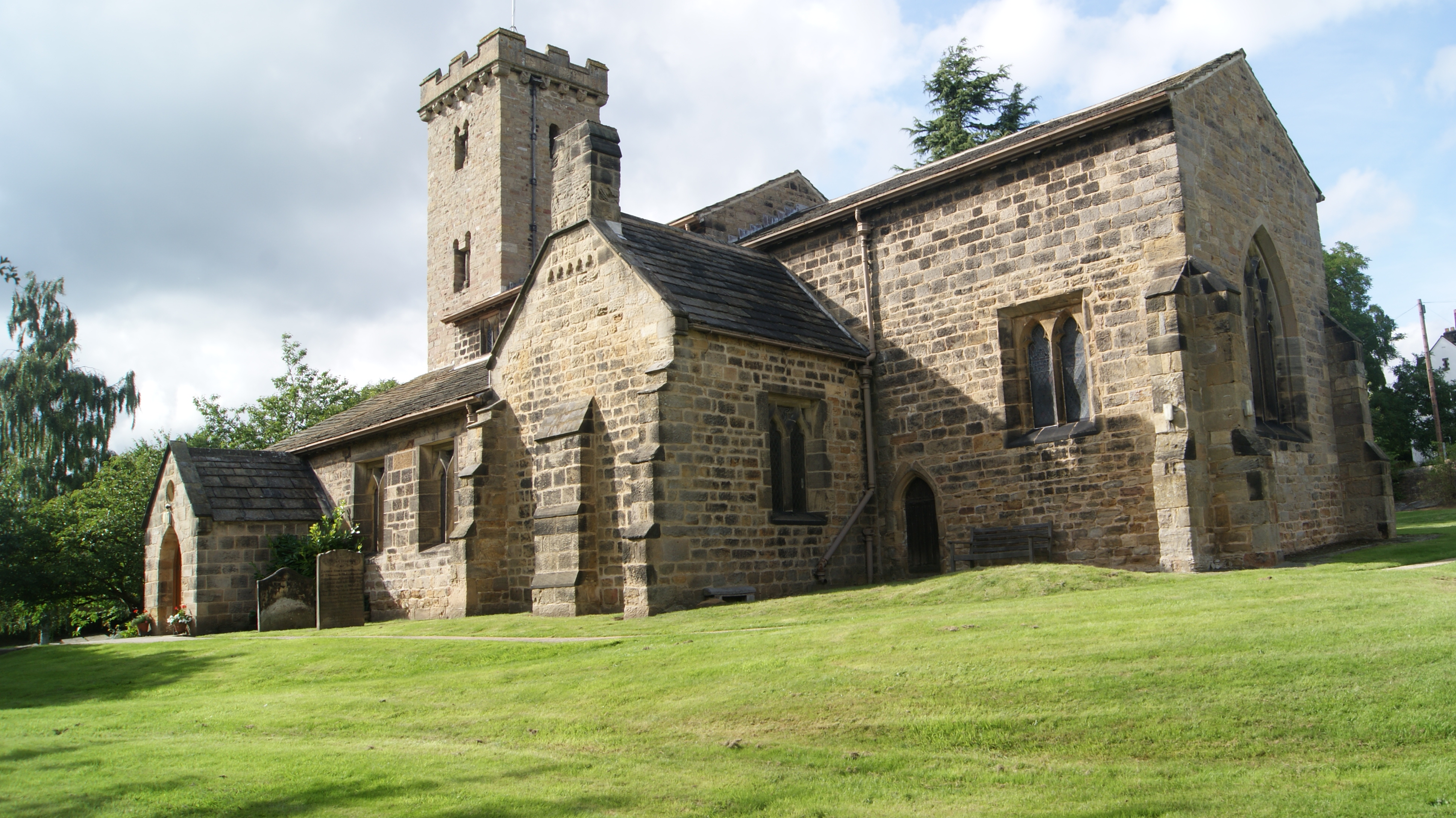
All Hallows Church

Nearby earthworks named Pompocali, in the parish of Scarcroft, are of uncertain origin, but possibly a result of quarrying. A minor Roman road lies alongside it, suggesting that Pompocali results from Roman activity.

A motte-and-bailey castle dates back to the time immediately following the Norman conquest. Bardsey also claims the oldest Anglo-Saxon tower church in England, with the tower of All Hallows church dating back to c. 850–950.

The Bingley Arms is a public house that claims to be England's oldest public house, and to be recorded in the Domesday Book, although these claims are disputed.

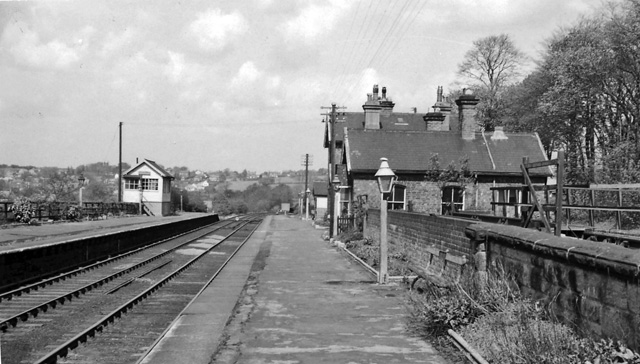
Bardsey railway station

Bardsey railway station on the Cross Gates–Wetherby line opened in 1876 and closed in 1964.

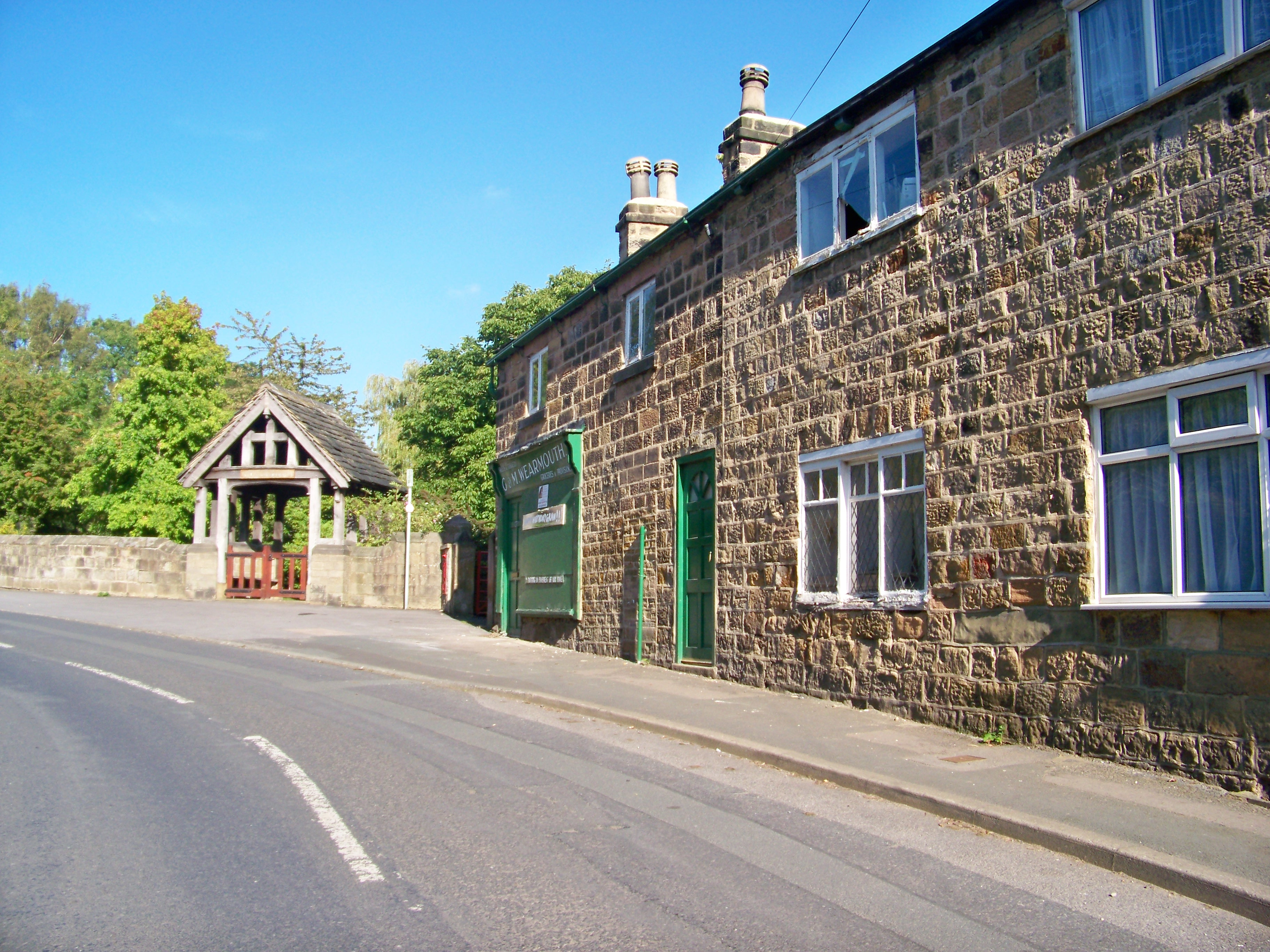
Church Lane

== Notable people ==
- William Congreve (1670–1729), an English playwright, poet and Whig politician.
- John Whittington (1837–??), an English first-class cricketer.

== See also ==
- Listed buildings in Bardsey cum Rigton
