= Green Man (folklore) =

Term in folklore

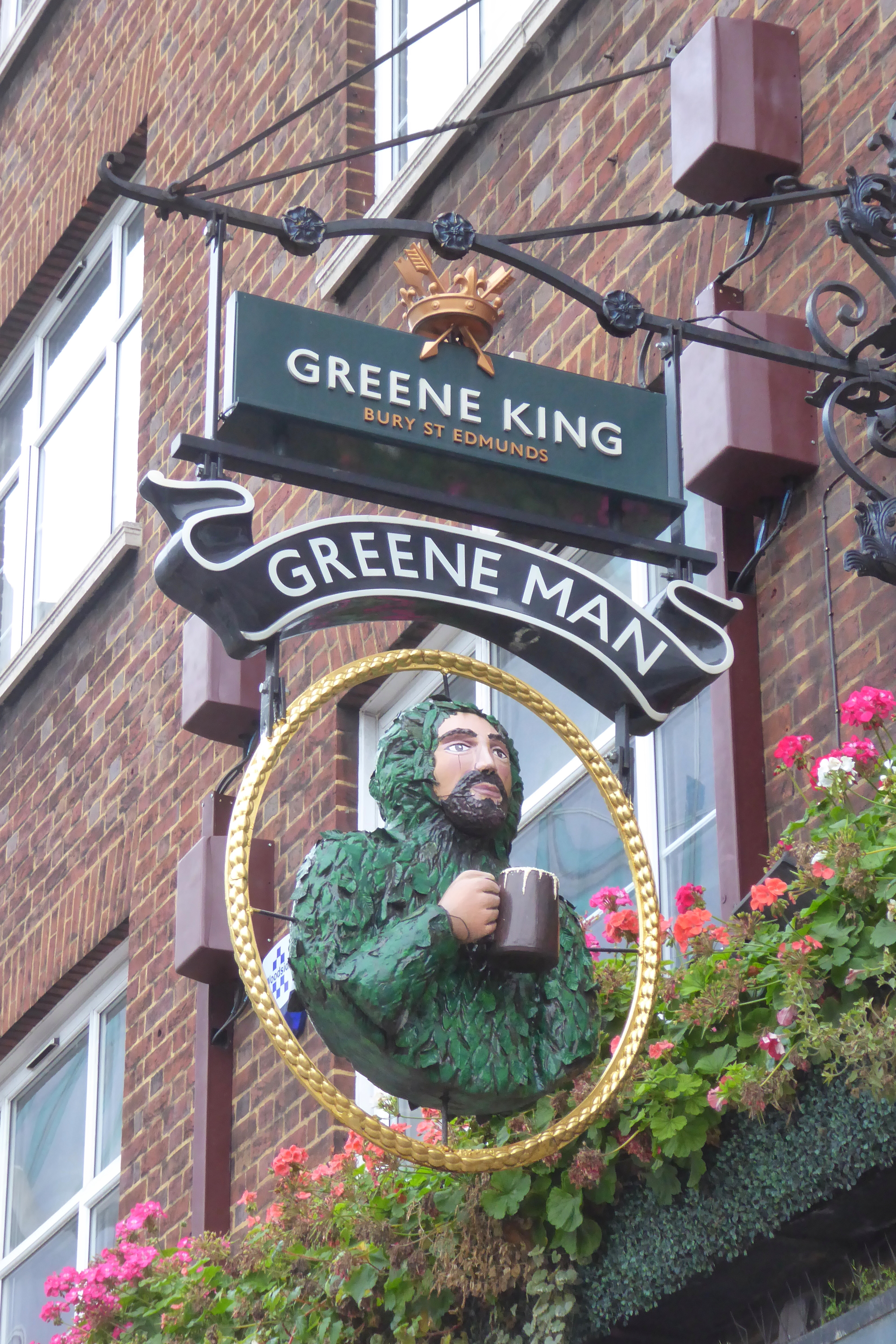
The sign of the Greene Man pub along Euston Road near Great Portland Street Station in the City of Westminster.

The Green Man is a term with a variety of connotations in folklore and related fields.

== Modern "Wild Man" version ==
During the early modern period in England, and sometimes elsewhere, the figure of a man dressed in a foliage costume, and usually carrying a club, was a variant of the broader European motif of the Wild Man (also known as wild man of the woods, or woodwose). By at least the 16th century, the term "green man" was used in England for a man who was covered in leaves, foliage including moss as part of a pageant, parade or ritual, who often was the whiffler (a person who clears a path or space through the crowd for a parade or performance). From the 17th century, such figures were used for the names of pubs, and painted on their signs.

== Theory connecting to pre-Christian motif ==
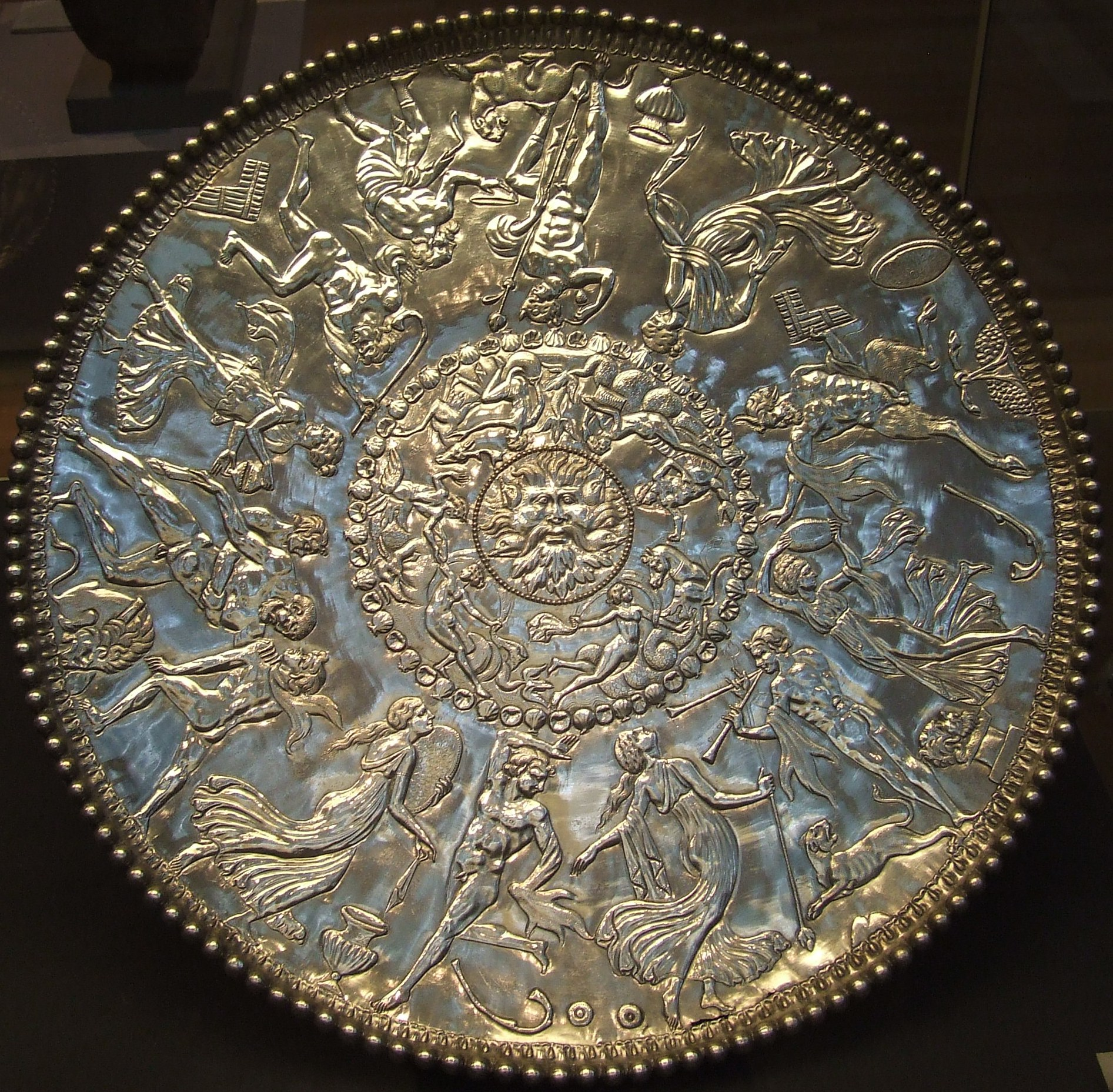
The Great Dish, or Great Plate of Bacchus from the Mildenhall Treasure, now in the British Museum, with Green Man motif at its centre

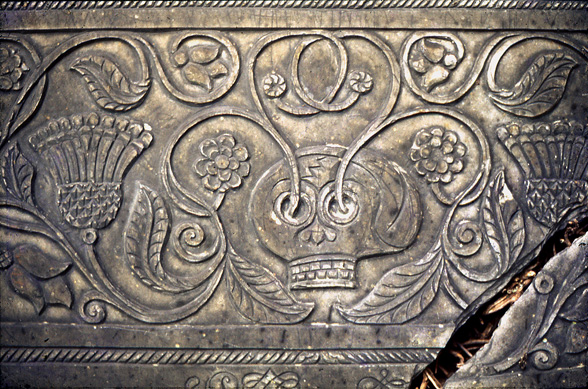
Grave slab in Shebbear churchyard in Devon showing skull with vines

In 1939, Julia Somerset, Lady Raglan, wrote an article in the journal Folklore that connected the foliate head artistic motif of medieval church architecture (which she also called the "Green Man") with other "green"-related concepts, such as the "Green Man" pubs, the Jack in the Green folk custom and May Day celebrations. She proposed that the "Green Man" represented a pagan fertility figure. The idea has been contested by other folklorists, who assert that Lady Raglan had no evidence that the foliate head motif or other concepts she associated with it were pagan in nature.

Lady Raglan's idea of the "Green Man" was adopted from the 1960s onward by the New Age and Neopagan movements, and some authors have considered it to represent a Jungian archetype. The nature of the Green Man as a mythological figure has been described as "20th-century folklore".

It has also been suggested that the Green Man represents the Roman forest God Silvanus, with over 40 inscriptions of said God being found in Britain.

== Popular, modern culture ==
=== Literature ===
The Green Man has been asserted by some authors to be a recurring theme in literature. Leo Braudy, in his 2016 book, Haunted: On Ghosts, Witches, Vampires, Zombies, and Other Monsters of the Natural and Supernatural Worlds asserts that the figures of Robin Hood and Peter Pan are associated with a Green Man, as is that of the Green Knight in Sir Gawain and the Green Knight. The Green Knight in this poem serves as both a monster antagonist and as mentor to Sir Gawain, belonging to a pre-Christian world which seems antagonistic to, but is in the end harmonious with, the Christian one. In Thomas Nashe's masque Summer's Last Will and Testament (1592, printed 1600), the character commenting upon the action remarks, after the exit of "Satyrs and wood-Nymphs", "The rest of the green men have reasonable voices […]".

During the post-war era, literary scholars interpreted the Green Knight as being a literary representation of Lady Raglan's Green Man as described in her article "The Green Man in Church Architecture", published in Folklore journal of March 1939. This association ultimately helped consolidate the belief that the Green Man was a genuine, Medieval folkloric, figure. Raglan's idea that the Green Man is a mythological figure has been described as "bunk", with other folklorists arguing that it is simply an architectural motif.

In the final years of the 20th century and earliest of the 21st, the appearance of the Green Man proliferated in children's literature. Examples of such novels in which the Green Man is a central character are Bel Mooney's 1997 works The Green Man and Joining the Rainbow, Jane Gardam's 1998 The Green Man, and Geraldine McCaughrean's 1998 The Stones are Hatching. Within many of these depictions, the Green Man figure absorbs and supplants a variety of other wild men and gods, in particular those which are associated with a seasonal death and rebirth. The Rotherweird Trilogy by Andrew Caldecott draws heavily on the concept of the Green Man, embodied by the gardener Hayman Salt who is transformed into the Green Man at the climax of the first book.

The Green Man is an integral character in Max Porter's novel Lanny, which was longlisted for the 2019 Booker Prize. The Green Men (including a suffragist irritated by the name) and their powers figure significantly in K. J. Charles's novel The Spectred Isle (2017), which was nominated for a RITA Award.

=== Film ===
An interpretation of the Green Man and related folklore such as the Sheela na gig inspired characters and motifs in Alex Garland's 2022 film Men.

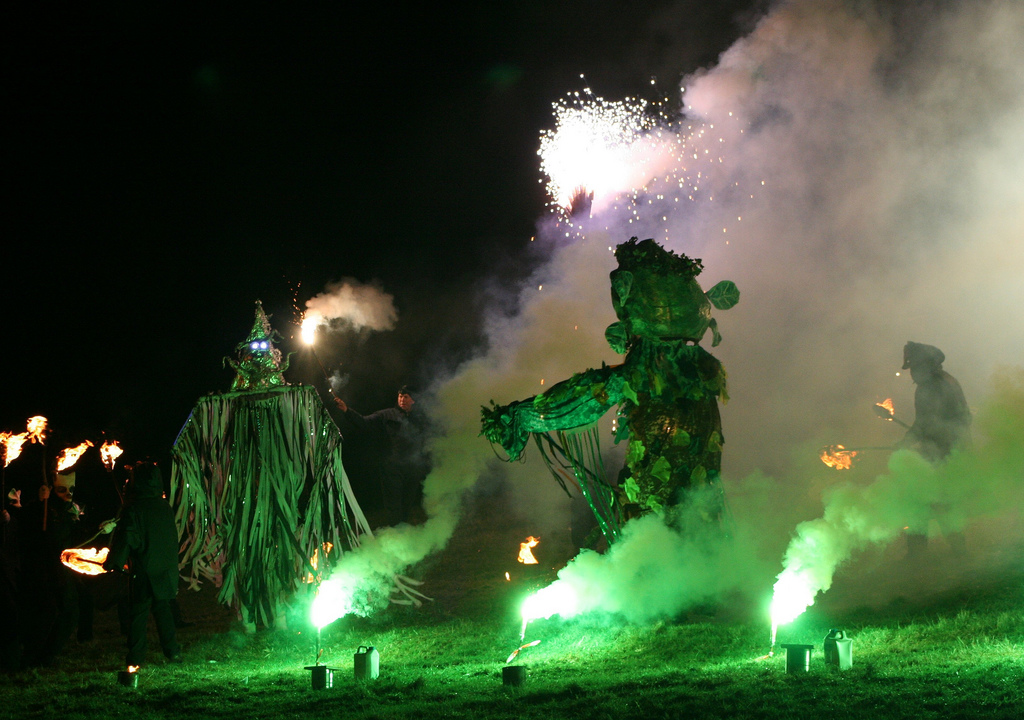
Dramatised combat between the Green Man and Jack Frost at a community festival in Yorkshire

=== Modern paganism ===
For many modern pagans, the Green Man is used as a symbol of seasonal renewal and ecological awareness. In Wicca, the Green Man has often been used as a representation of the Horned God, a syncretic deity that incorporates aspects of, among others, the Celtic Cernunnos and the Greek Pan.

== See also ==
- Apple Tree Man
- Blodeuwedd
- Burryman
- Clun Green Man Festival
- Ent
- Flower Pot Men
- Gargoyle
- Green Giant
- The Green Man of Knowledge
- Grotesque
- Holly King and Oak King
- Hunky punk
- Jack in the Green
- Krampus
- List of nature deities
- Sheela na Gig
- Three hares
- Wild Man

== Citations ==
=== Sources cited ===
- Basford, Kathleen (1998) [1978]. The Green Man. Cambridge: D. S. Brewer. ISBN 978-0859914970.
- Bramwell, Peter (2009). Pagan Themes in Modern Children's Fiction: Green Man, Shamanism, Earth Mysteries. New York: Palgrave Macmillan. ISBN 978-0-230-21839-0.
