= Greene Man =

London tavern

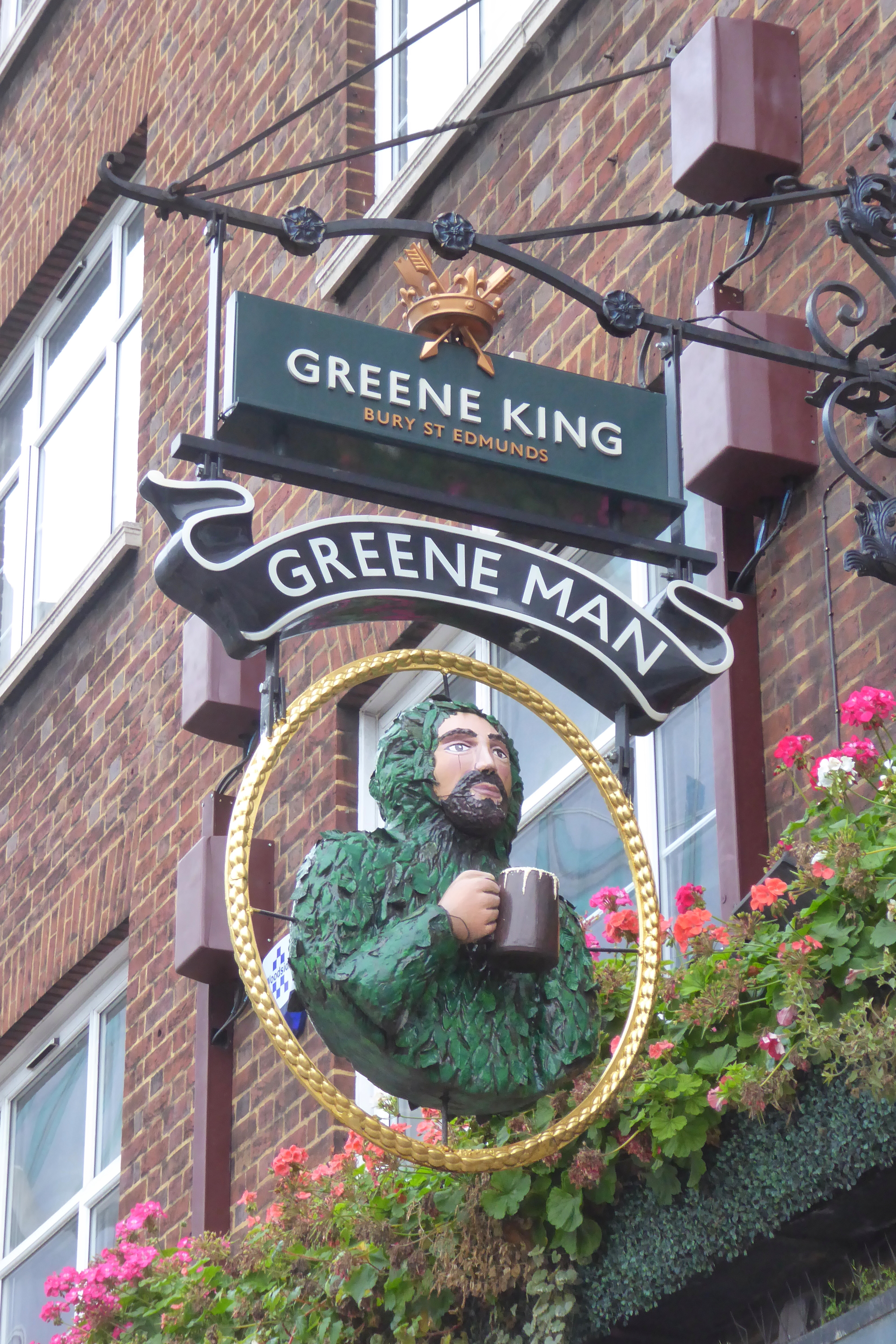
- Its inn sign and window box in 2019
- Former names: Green Man (and Porters Bar); Farthing Pie House

General information
- Location: 383 Euston Road
- Coordinates: 51.5237°N 0.1432°W

Website
- www.greeneking-pubs.co.uk

The Greene Man is a public house in London's Euston Road. It was formerly known as the Green Man (and Porters Bar) and before that, the Farthing Pie House or Pye House as mutton pies could be bought there for a farthing. When it was established in the 18th century, the area was rural and so the surroundings were farm fields and pleasure gardens. The place was then frequented by notable artists and writers including William Blake and Richard Wilson.

== Farthing Pie House ==
There has been a tavern in this location for centuries. It was founded in 1708 as the Farthing Pie House or Pye House. This was a common name for a place where a mutton pie could be bought for a farthing.

It was mentioned by Henry Carey in his prelude to his popular song, "Sally in our Alley", which was written around 1716. Carey explained the song's inspiration – a shoemaker's apprentice taking his sweetheart on a tour of London's sights which finished with "proceeding to the Farthing Pye-house, he gave her a Collation of Buns, Cheesecakes, Gammon of Bacon, Stuff’d-beef, and Bottled-ale;" Defoe's 1722 novel Colonel Jack also alludes to the tavern, when young Jack crosses London into a large field named after it.

The most famous landlord in this period was Mr Price, who was known for his skill in making music by beating a salt-box with a rolling pin, accompanying musicians such as Carl Friedrich Abel, who played the violoncello.

The tavern appears on Rocque's map of 1746 on the corner of the Green Lane with the East-West track which was later to become the New Road. The place then had a walled garden. Bilson's Farm is shown on the other side of the junction – a farm of 133 acres which later became part of Regent's Park. There are no other buildings nearby as the area was not yet developed, the surroundings were still open fields, ponds and tracks. The area was described in the recollections of John Thomas Smith:

I should have noticed Kendall’s farm which in 1746 belonged to a farmer of the name of Bilson, a pretty large one, where I have seen eight or ten immense hay-ricks all on a row; it stood on the site of the commencement of the present Osnaburg Street, nearly opposite the Green Man, originally called the Farthing Pie House.
...
It commanded views of the old Queen's Head and Artichoke, the old Jew’s Harp House, and the distant hills of Highgate, Hampstead, Primrose, and Harrow. I was then in my eighth year, and frequently played at trap-ball between the above-mentioned sombre elms.
...
when the sites of Portland Place, Devonshire Street, etc., were fields, the famous Tommy Lowe, then a singer at Mary-le-bone Gardens, raised a subscription, to enable an unfortunate man to run a small chariot, drawn by four muzzled mastiffs, from a pond near Portland Chapel, called Cockney Ladle, which supplied Mary-le-bone Bason with water, to the Farthing Pie House in order to accommodate children with a ride for a halfpenny.

== Green Man ==
The radical MP John Wilkes campaigned there for election to the Middlesex constituency as the suffrage was limited to wealthy freeholders who could be found there. At the end of the 18th century, it was frequented by William Blake as a young man. In 1809, it was renamed the Green Man. The Welsh painter Richard Wilson played skittles there.

The pub is now owned by Greene King who changed the spelling of the sign to match their name, when they took over the Spirit Pub Company in 2015 and retired the Taylor Walker brewery brand. In 2019, the cheapest pie on the menu is Woodland Mushroom & Ale which costs £10.99. As there were 960 farthings in a pound sterling, the nominal price of a pie has risen by a factor of over 10,000.

The Farthing Pye House next to Bilson's Farm on John Rocque's Map of London, 1746.

The Farthing Pie House in 1780, painted in watercolour by Thomas H. Shepherd around 1850 from an old drawing

The Farthing Pie House in 1820, as shown in Walford's Old and New London

Painted in 1830 by J. Breun, after it had been renamed the Green Man and the New Road had become built-up

The Greene Man in 2019.
