= Andrew Caldecott (barrister) =

British barrister and author

Andrew Caldecott KC
- Born: 22 June 1952 (age 74); United Kingdom
- Education: Eton College; New College, Oxford

Andrew Hilary Caldecott KC (born 22 June 1952) is a British barrister and author.

== Life ==
Caldecott was educated at Eton and read history at New College, Oxford (1970–73). He was called to the bar in 1975 and took silk in 1994. He was named “Defamation and Privacy Silk of the Year” in 2005, 2007 and 2009. Caldecott is listed as a leading silk in Media, Defamation and Privacy in the Legal 500. He is also a writer and his novel Rotherweird was published in 2017.

=== Cases ===
Caldecott represented the BBC in the Hutton Inquiry and The Guardian in the Leveson Inquiry. He has also represented a large number of celebrity clients including Naomi Campbell and Johnny Depp.

=== Author ===
Caldecott is the author of multiple books.

Rotherweird series:

- Rotherweird (2017)
- Wyntertide (2018)
- Lost Acre (2019)

Momenticon duology:

- Momenticon (2022)
- Simul (2024)
