= Pagan Themes in Modern Children's Fiction =

2009 book by Peter Bramwell

Pagan Themes in Modern Children's Fiction: Green Man, Shamanism, Earth Mysteries
- Author: Peter Bramwell
- Genre: Reference
- Publisher: Palgrave Macmillan
- Publication date: March 31, 2009
- Pages: xi, 224
- ISBN: 978-0-230-21839-0
- OCLC: 276930424
- Text: Pagan Themes in Modern Children's Fiction: Green Man, Shamanism, Earth Mysteries at Springer Nature

Pagan Themes in Modern Children's Fiction: Green Man, Shamanism, Earth Mysteries is a 2009 reference work by Peter Bramwell, published by Palgrave Macmillan.
